= List of dales in the Peak District =

List of valleys in the English Peak District

This is a list of dales in the Peak District of England, arranged geographically from north to south. Most lie within the Peak District National Park, but others lie outside its borders. Side dales are indented under the dale from which they branch. An alphabetical list follows at the end.

Dales draining to the Irish Sea

- Greenfield Valley
- Longdendale
- Upper Goyt Valley
- Dane Valley

Dales draining to the North Sea

- Bradfield Dale
- Upper Derwent Valley
  - Woodlands Valley
- Vale of Edale
- Hope Valley
- Cave Dale
- Intake Dale
- Padley Gorge
- Middleton Dale
- Coombs Dale
- Dam Dale
- Hay Dale
- Peter Dale
- Wye Valley
  - Ashwood Dale
    - Cunning Dale
    - Cow Dale
    - Kidtor Dale
  - Wye Dale
    - Deep Dale
      - Horseshoe Dale
      - Back Dale
      - Brierlow Dale
    - Woo Dale
    - Great Rocks Dale
  - Chee Dale
    - Flag Dale
    - Blackwell Dale
    - Monk's Dale
  - Miller's Dale
    - Tideswell Dale
    - Cressbrook Dale
      - Tansley Dale
  - Water-cum-Jolly Dale
  - Upperdale
    - Hay Dale
  - Monsal Dale
    - Taddington Dale
      - High Dale
    - Deep Dale (Taddington)
    - Kirk Dale
- Dowel Dale
- Glutton Dale
- Lathkill Dale
  - Cales Dale
- Long Dale (Hartington)
- Hartington Dale
- Gratton Dale
- Long Dale
- Darley Dale
- Lumsdale Valley
- Ballidon Dale
- Via Gellia (Griff Grange Valley)
- Dovedale
  - Biggin Dale
  - Wolfscote Dale
    - Beresford Dale
  - Mill Dale
  - Hall Dale
- Manifold Valley

== Alphabetical list ==
- Ashwood Dale
- Back Dale
- Ballidon Dale
- Biggin Dale
- Beresford Dale
- Blackwell Dale
- Bradfield Dale
- Brierlow Dale
- Cales Dale
- Cave Dale
- Chee Dale
- Coombs Dale
- Cow Dale
- Cressbrook Dale
- Cunning Dale
- Dam Dale
- Darley Dale
- Deep Dale
- Deep Dale (Taddington Dale)
- Dovedale
- Dowel Dale
- Flag Dale
- Glutton Dale
- Gratton Dale
- Great Rocks Dale
- Hall Dale
- Hartington Dale
- Hay Dale
- Hay Dale (Upperdale)
- High Dale
- Hope Valley
- Horseshoe Dale
- Intake Dale
- Kidtor Dale
- Kirk Dale
- Lathkill Dale
- Long Dale
- Long Dale (Hartington)
- Longdendale
- Lumsdale Valley
- Manifold Valley
- Middleton Dale
- Mill Dale
- Miller's Dale
- Monk's Dale
- Monsal Dale
- Padley Gorge
- Peter Dale
- Taddington Dale
- Tansley Dale
- Tideswell Dale
- Upperdale
- Upper Derwent Valley
- Vale of Edale
- Via Gellia (Griff Grange Valley)
- Water-cum-Jolly Dale
- Wolfscote Dale
- Woo Dale
- Woodlands Valley
- Wye Dale
- Wye Valley
