= Cales Dale =

Valley in Derbyshire, England

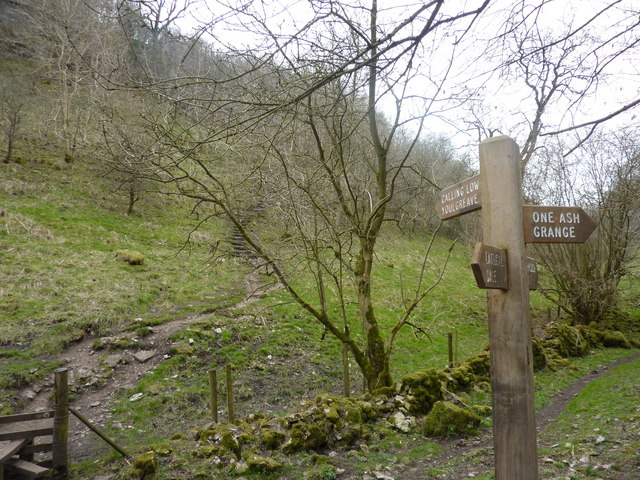
- Limestone Way crossing in Cales Dale
- Floor elevation: 200 metres (656 ft)
- Length: 2 kilometres (1.2 mi)
- Width: 130 metres (427 ft)
- Depth: 60 metres (197 ft)

Geography
- Location: Derbyshire, England
- Population centers: Monyash and Youlgreave
- Coordinates: 53.1835°N 1.7433°W
- Rivers: Tributary of River Lathkill
- Interactive map of Cales Dale

Cales Dale is a short valley towards the head of Lathkill Dale near Monyash, Derbyshire, in the Peak District of England.

Cales Dale is included within Lathkill Dale as part of the Derbyshire Dales National Nature Reserve and is popular with tourists who visit for its natural environment and wildlife. Natural England manages the reserve which covers five separate dales of the White Peak (Lathkill Dale, Cressbrook Dale, Hay Dale, Long Dale and Monk’s Dale). The Lathkill Dale Site of Special Scientific Interest (SSSI) includes Cales Dale and is known for its range of wildflower species (including orchids and the rare Jacob's ladder), butterflies, ancient woodland and the presence of birds of prey, dippers, woodpeckers and water voles. Most of Cales Dale is designated as Open Access Land under the Countryside and Rights of Way Act 2000.

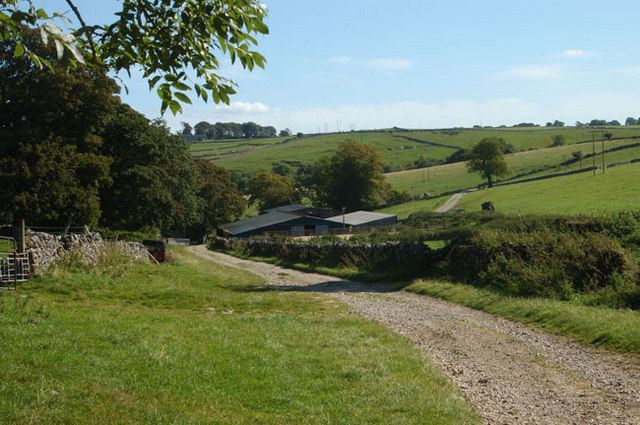
One Ash Grange Farm

The Medieval settlement on the north western slopes of Cales Dale is a Scheduled Monument. The monument consists of earthwork remains from a settlement related to the neighbouring monastic grange at One Ash, which is mentioned in the Domesday Book of 1086. In the late 12th century the Cistercian monks of Roche Abbey established the grange. The foundations of a building 20m long by 12m wide have been identified. Parts of a stone cross head, from the 10th or 11th century were found nearby and are now on display in Buxton Museum. One Ash Grange Farm's farmhouse, barn and pigstyes are Grade II listed buildings.

Calling Low bowl barrow is a Bronze Age burial mound above the east side of Cales Dale and is a Scheduled Monument. It was excavated by Thomas Bateman in 1846. He found a cist containing a human skeleton, a sandstone sphere and flint tools.

The Limestone Way long-distance footpath crosses Cales Dale near One Ash Grange Farm.

There are parking areas near Monyash at the top end of Lathkill Dale. There is also a car park at Moor Lane towards Youlgreave.

The 'Battle of Wits' scene of the film The Princess Bride was shot at the foot of Cales Dale in 1986.
