= Limey Way =

Challenge walk through Derbyshire, England

Coordinates: 53.1833°N 1.7395°W

- The woven badge
- Length: 65 km (40 mi)
- Location: Derbyshire, England
- Trailheads: Castleton/Dovedale
- Use: Hiking
- Difficulty: Moderate to Strenuous
- Season: All year round
- Sights: Derbyshire limestone dales
- Hazards: Some open exposure in winter

The Limey Way is a 65-kilometre (40 mi) challenge walk through Derbyshire, England. It starts at Castleton and progresses through 15 major and 5 minor limestone dales to reach the River Dove and Dovedale, the walk's end.

The walk was first walked by John Merrill and was devised, created and inaugurated by him in May 1969. He wrote a copyright guide to the walk, which has been updated and enlarged over the years. More than 75,000 people have walked the route in either under 24 hours - Red Badge or under 48 hours - Green badge.

- Castleton car park – grid reference SK150829
- Cave Dale
- Hurdlow Barn
- Old Moor
- Peak Forest – SK114793
- Dam Dale
- Hay Dale
- Wheston – SK133763
- Monk's Dale
- Millers Dale
- Cressbrook Mill – SK174728
- Monsal Dale
- Deep Dale
- Monyash – SK150665
- Lathkill Dale
- Bradford Dale
- Smerrill Grange – SK199619
- Gratton Dale
- Long Dale
- Friden – SK169603
- Biggin Dale
- Wolfcote Dale
- Milldale – SK139547
- Dovedale
- Thorpe Cloud
- River Dove Stepping Stones
- FINISH: Dovedale Car Park SK146508
