= Wye Valley, Derbyshire =

Valley in the Derbyshire Peak District

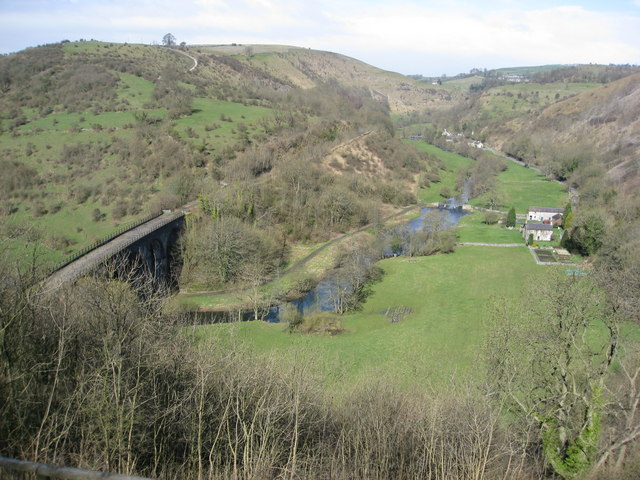
- Monsal Head Viaduct and River Wye
- Length: 15 miles (24 km) West-East
- Width: 100 to 500 metres (330 to 1,640 ft)
- Depth: 100 metres (330 ft)

Geography
- Location: Derbyshire, England
- Coordinates: 53.2488°N 1.8598°W
- Rivers: River Wye
- Interactive map of Wye Valley, Derbyshire

The Wye Valley is the limestone valley of the River Wye in the White Peak of Derbyshire, England. The source of the River Wye is west of Buxton on Axe Edge Moor. One main channel runs underground through Poole's Cavern. The river flows though Buxton Pavilion Gardens and then along a culvert under the town centre. After leaving the flat area of central Buxton, the Wye Valley becomes distinct as a gorge running east for 10 miles (16 km) before the valley broadens at Ashford-in-the Water.

The A6 road from Buxton to Bakewell follows the Wye Valley for most of its path. The Manchester, Buxton, Matlock and Midland Junction Railway used to run through the valley. It was built to link Manchester through the Peak District to London and operated from the 1860s to 1968.

== Geology ==
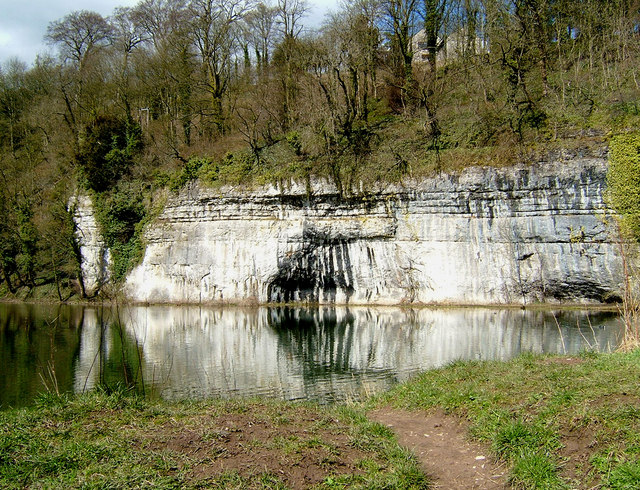
Limestone crags beside the River Wye

The White Peak area of the Peak District is named after the limestone plateau landscape of the 'Derbyshire Dome' anticline. The plateau is generally between 200 and 300 m (660 and 980 ft) above sea level. The Carboniferous limestone rocks of all the dales in the White Peak were formed 350 million years ago from the shells and sediments of a tropical sea. These deposits were compressed into rocks which over time were uplifted and folded into a dome. Erosion of the younger sandstones exposed the limestone strata below. The landscape of dales was then sculpted by the melt water from the last Ice Age 20,000 years ago.

== Dales ==
Beyond Buxton the Wye Valley is known as a series of dales, which are gorges with numerous side valley gorges.

=== Ashwood Dale ===
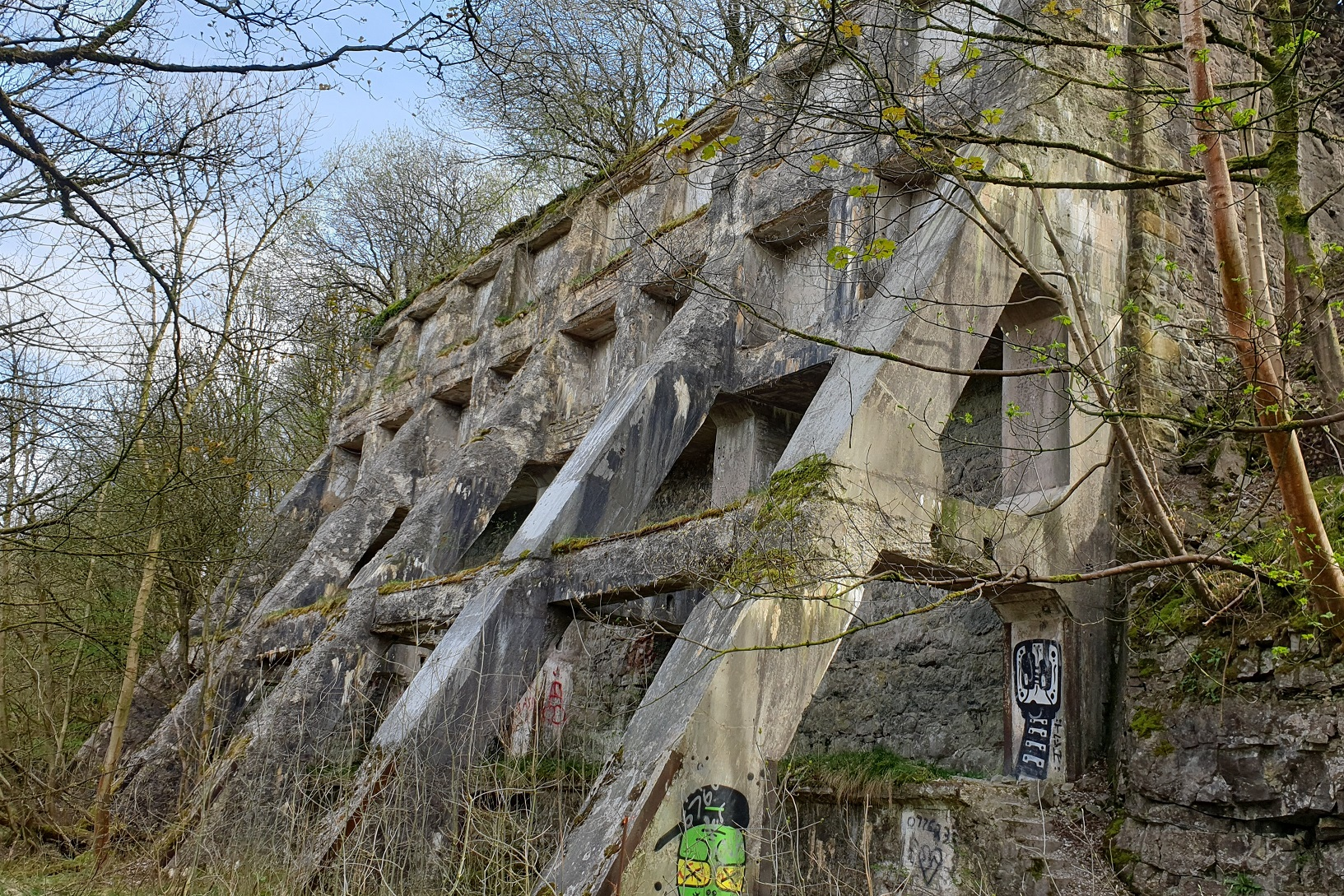
Cowdale quarry lime kilns in Ashwood Dale

After leaving Ashwood Park (in Mill Dale) in Buxton, the river enters the steep-sided Ashwood Dale. Here Joseph Mallard William Turner sketched Lovers' Leap and its waterfall in about 1831. The story of Lovers' Leap is that an eloping couple managed to leap across the chasm on horseback on their way to get married at Peak Forest church, evading their pursuing parents. The narrow dry gorge of Cunning Dale joins from the north. The short steep Cow Dale and Kidtor Dale are next to each other on the opposite side to Cunning Dale. The remains of Cowdale quarry's 19th-century buildings and lime kilns are high up on the south slope. The site is a Scheduled Monument.

=== Wye Dale ===
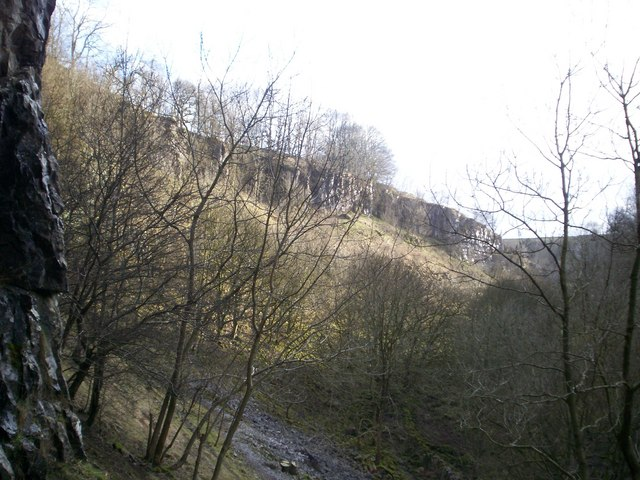
View of Deep Dale from Thirst House cave

The dry valley of Woo Dale joins Wye Dale from the north. 'Woo Dale Limestone' is quarried at Tarmac's Tunstead Quarry (the largest limestone quarry in the UK) between Woo Dale and Great Rocks Dale. Topley Pike limestone quarry is on the south side of the Wye Valley opposite Woo Dale and close to the hamlet of King Sterndale. Deep Dale also joins the main valley from the south. Thirst House Cave in Deep Dale is 58 m (190 ft) long and in the late 19th-century a bear's skull and Roman artefacts were discovered there. The Peak District Boundary Walk route comes down Deep Dale and along Wye Dale before heading north at Chee Dale.

=== Chee Dale ===
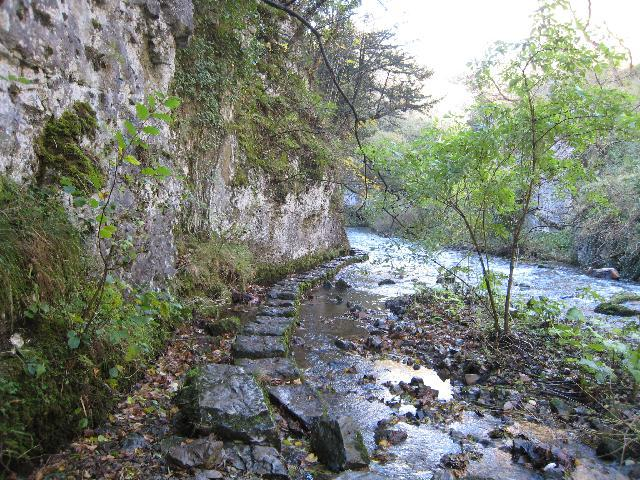
Stepping stones in Chee Dale

The Monsal Trail bridleway runs for 8.5 miles (13.7 km) from Topley Pike Junction (at the head of Chee Dale) past Bakewell to Rowsley, along the disused Midland Railway line. It passes through Upper Chee Dale and then enters the two tunnels through Chee Tor hill to Miller's Dale. 'Chee Tor Limestone' is a bed of particularly fine limestone. The crags of carboniferous limestone in Upper Chee Dale and of Chee Tor cliff in Lower Chee Dale have extensive rock climbing routes. Flag Dale joins the valley from the north at Chee Tor. The village of Wormhill is nearby on the north side of the valley. Blackwell Dale is on the south side before Miller's Dale.

=== Miller's Dale ===
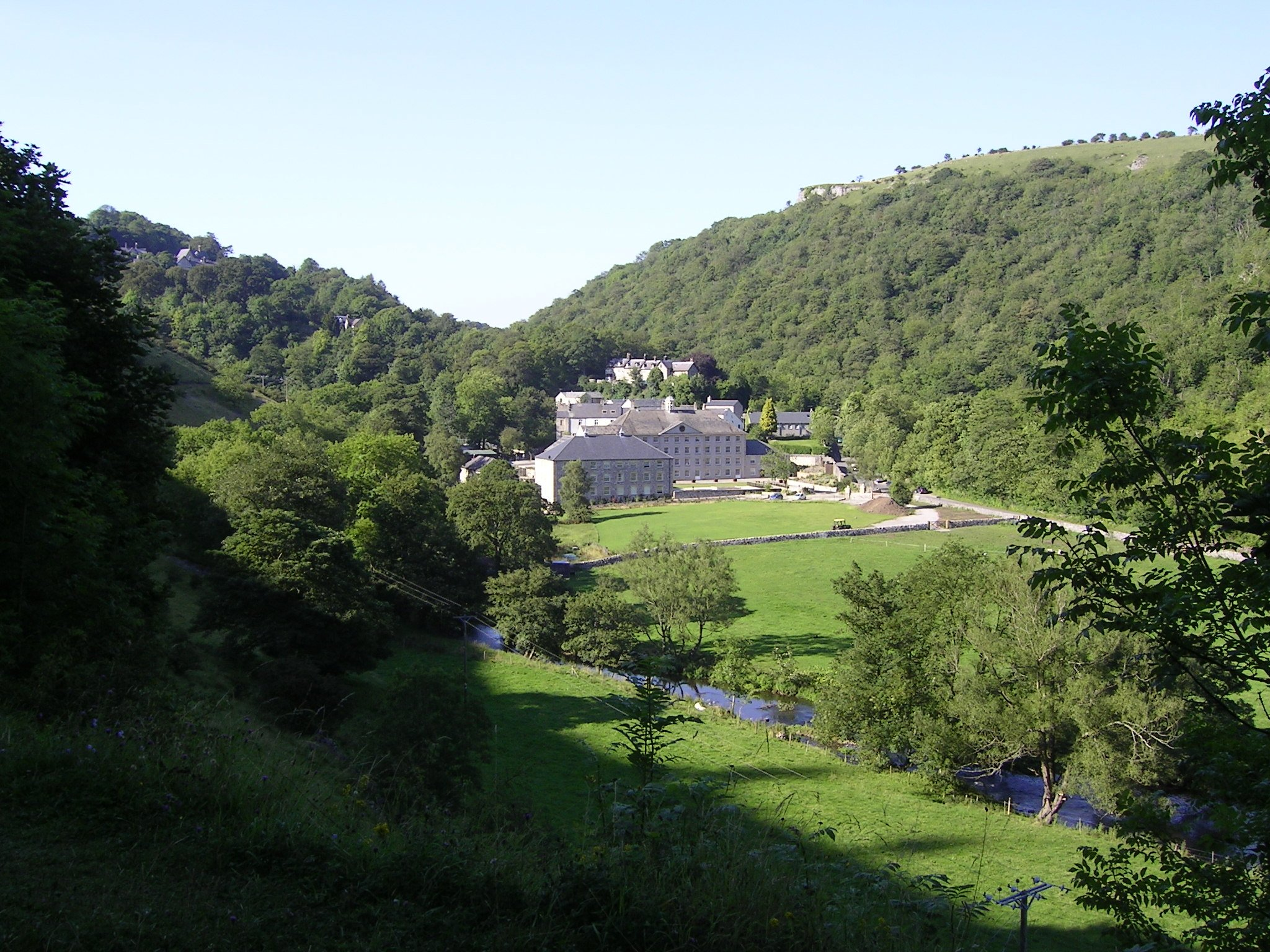
Cressbrook Mill by the River Wye

Miller's Dale's main landmarks are the twin railway viaducts, built in 1866 and 1905 to carry four lines. Millers Dale railway station was once a large and busy goods and passenger station. It is now a main visitor centre for the Monsal Trail. Monk's Dale (named after the monastic grange set up there by Lenton Priory) on the north side is a secluded steep valley. The Limestone Way footpath crosses Miller's Dale and runs up and parallel to Monk's Dale. Tideswell Dale is further downstream on the north side. Ravenstor cliff at the foot of Tideswell Dale is popular with rock climbers. Beyond Tideswell Dale is Litton Mill, a cotton spinning mill dating back to 1782 and notorious for its harsh child labour conditions. The Wye Valley is known as Water-cum-Jolly Dale where Cressbrook Dale joins it from the north. Another cotton mill Cressbrook Mill was built in 1815 and dominates the view by the river. The Wye Valley then becomes Upperdale with Hay Dale on the north side before the river reaches Monsal Head.

=== Monsal Dale ===
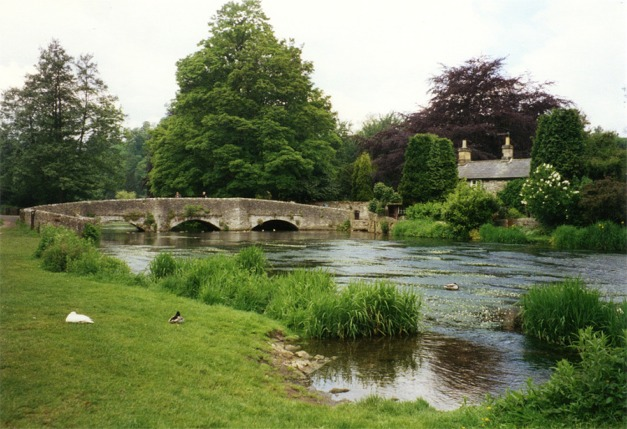
Sheepwash Bridge at Ashford in the Water

The Monsal Trail passes over the Monsal Headstone viaduct which was built in 1863 by the Midland Railway over the River Wye. It is 90 metres (300 ft) long and up to 20 metres (66 ft) high. Fin Cop hill overlooks Monsal Dale and its Iron Age hillfort is a Scheduled Monument. The A6 road runs down Taddington Dale to follow the riverside again, where Deep Dale converges with the valley on the south side. Kirk Dale lies on the south side at Ashford-in-the-Water.

Beyond Ashford-in-the-Water the valley broadens and the River Wye flows into the River Derwent past Bakewell at Rowsley.

== Nature ==
The Wye Valley Site of Special Scientific Interest (SSSI) runs for over 9 miles (14 km) east of Buxton. It covers Cunning Dale, Woo Dale, Wye Dale, Chee Dale, Tideswell Dale, Monsal Dale and Taddington Wood. These dales contain ancient ash and wych elm woodland, with areas of yew and rock whitebeam trees. The valley is habitat for an abundance of wildflowers. Dippers are often seen darting low above the river and bobbing on rocks in the river.

Deep Dale and Topley Pike is a protected nature reserve (looked after by the Derbyshire Wildlife Trust) and is also a designated Site of Special Scientific Interest (SSSI).

Chee Dale, Miller's Dale quarry and Priestcliffe Lees in Miller's Dale are protected nature reserves, which are overseen by the Derbyshire Wildlife Trust.

Monk's Dale and Cressbrook Dale are part of the Derbyshire Dales National Nature Reserve managed by Natural England. Monk's Dale and Cressbook Dale are also each a designated Site of Special Scientific Interest (SSSI). They are especially important for the lichens growing on the limestone outcrops.
