= Limestone Way =

Long-distance footpath in England

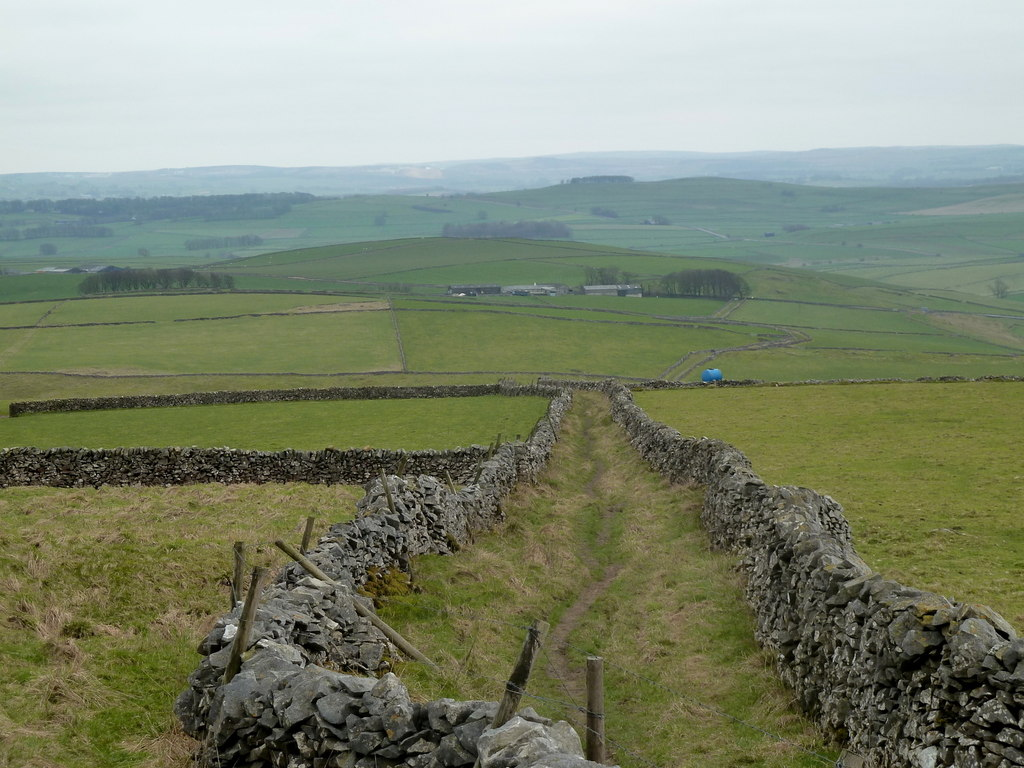
- The Limestone Way near Peak Forest
- Length: 46 miles (74 km)
- Location: Central England
- Trailheads: Castleton, Derbyshire; Rocester, Staffordshire
- Use: Hiking, Mountain Biking, Horse Riding
- Elevation gain/loss: 1,806 metres (5,925 ft)
- Highest point: 461 metres (1,512 ft) on Bradwell Moor

The Limestone Way is a waymarked long-distance footpath in Derbyshire, England. It runs for 46 miles (74 km) through the White Peak of the Peak District National Park, from Castleton south to Rocester over the county boundary into Staffordshire. The trail is named for the limestone scenery along its route. It was devised by Brian Spencer of Matlock Rotary Club and developed and opened in 1986 by the West Derbyshire District Council (which became Derbyshire Dales District Council in 1987). It originally ran to Matlock, but was extended to its current, longer route in 1992 to join up with the Staffordshire Way.

== The route ==
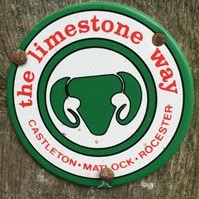

From Castleton, the route runs up Cave Dale, past the village of Peak Forest, down Hay Dale (shared with the Peak District Boundary Walk) and along Peter Dale. It then runs parallel to Monk's Dale and through the village of Millers Dale (passing under the viaduct which carries the Monsal Trail and crossing the River Wye).

It then crosses the A6 near the Waterloo Inn and over Taddington Moor. The trail follows old miners' tracks through the villages of Flagg and Monyash, across Cales Dale and past Youlgreave along the River Bradford through Bradford Dale. The route then continues across Harthill Moor (past the rock outcrops of Robin Hood's Stride and Cratcliffe Rocks), following the ancient Portway track past the village of Elton, around Winster and Bonsall and through Grangemill (across the Via Gellia road), after which it crosses the Midshires Way and the High Peak Trail. The trail then passes north of Brassington, past Rainster Rocks and runs through the ancient hamlet of Ballidon. The route goes into the village of Parwich and then crosses the Tissington Trail before running through Tissington itself and onto Thorpe.

The trail crosses into Staffordshire over the River Dove at Coldwall Bridge and then down into Dovedale at Ellastone on its approach to the Roman settlement of Rocester.

== Sights ==
The Limestone Way passes through a historic landscape with prehistoric monuments, Roman sites and centuries of industrial heritage:

- Peveril Castle ruins at Castleton
- Route of Batham Gate Roman road
- Hay Dale, part of Derbyshire Dales National Nature Reserve
- Twin railway viaducts at Millers Dale railway station
- Wye Valley SSSI (Site of Special Scientific Interest)
- Five Wells chambered tomb on Taddington Moor
- One Ash Grange, established by the Roche Abbey monks in 1147
- Lomberdale Hall at Youlgreave, home of local Victorian antiquarian Thomas Bateman
- Nine Stones Close, Bronze Age stone circle
- Robin Hood's Stride gritstone outcrop and pinnacles
- Cratcliffe Rocks with its hermit cave
- View of Carsington Water
- Medieval settlement and field system of Ballidon, with its Norman chapel
- Tissington Hall, historic Jacobean home of the FitzHerbert family
- Civil War redoubt (military earthwork defence) at Tissington
- Coldwall Bridge over the River Dove
- Ellastone Bridge over the River Dove

== Access ==
Train stations: Matlock, Cromford.

Spurs link to Bonsall and onto Matlock (along the old route of the path) and from Thorpe to Ashbourne.

Details of connecting routes may be found on the Limestone Way page of the Long Distance Walkers' Association website.

The official guidebook is the Limestone Way Walker's Guide, published by Derbyshire Dales District Council.

The route is marked on Ordance Survey maps and is covered by three OS Explorer maps:

- OL1 – The Peak District (Dark Peak)
- OL24 – The Peak District (White Peak)
- 259 – Derby
