= National nature reserves in Derbyshire =

National nature reserves in Derbyshire, England, are established by Natural England, and managed by them or by non-governmental organisations including the National Trust.

List of reserves:

- Calke Park NNR
- Derbyshire Dales National Nature Reserve
- Dovedale
- Kinder Scout NNR

Other national nature reserves all over England:

- National nature reserves in England
- Natural England
