= Lathkill Dale =

Valley in the Derbyshire Peak District

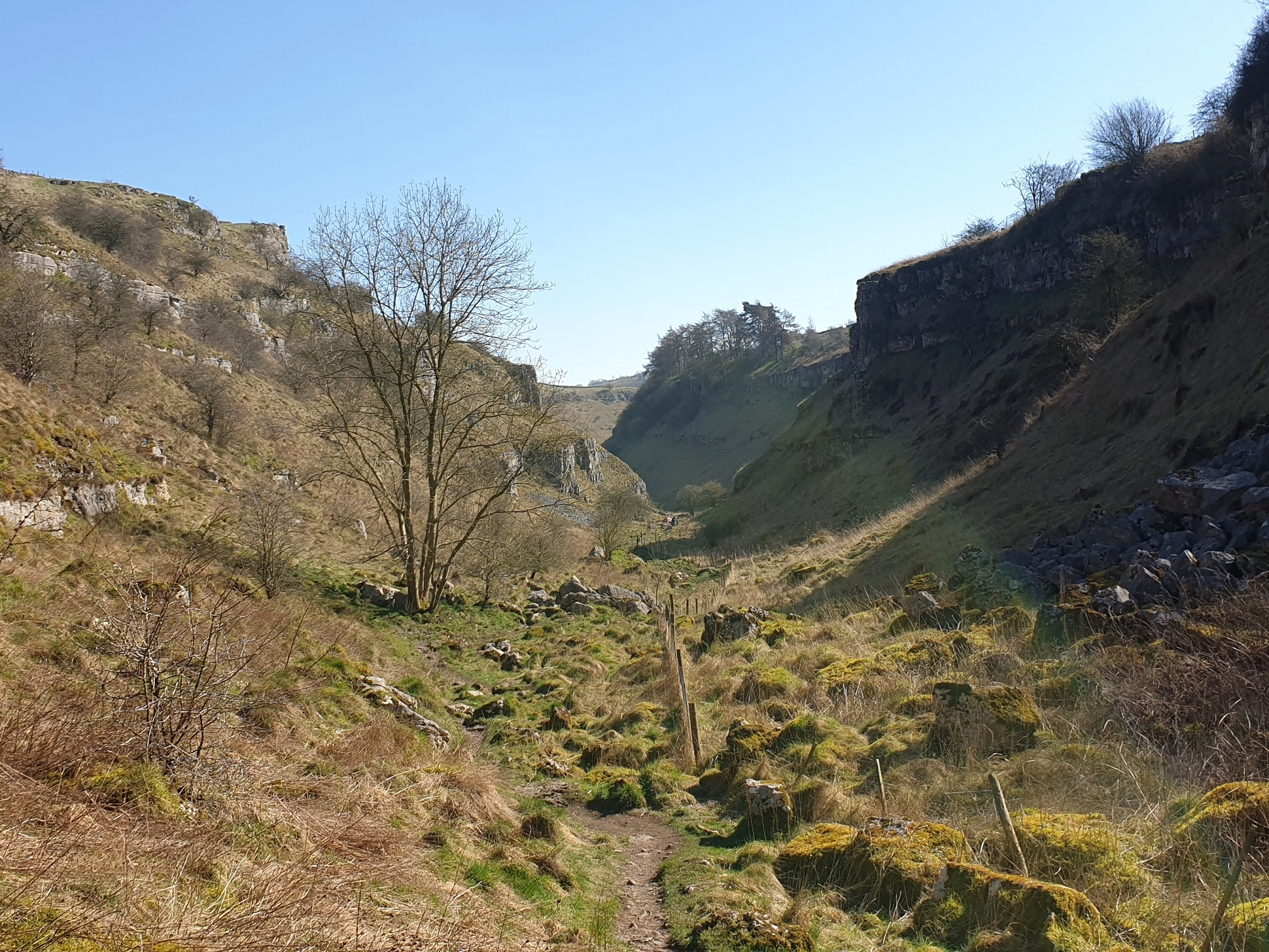
- View down Lathkill Dale near Monyash

Geography
- Location: Derbyshire, England
- Coordinates: 53.1846°N 1.7639°W
- Rivers: River Lathkill
- Interactive map of Lathkill Dale

Lathkill Dale is the valley of the River Lathkill near Bakewell, Derbyshire in the Peak District of England. The river emerges into the dale from springs below Lathkill Head Cave (or, in wet conditions, from the cave itself). Towards the head of the dale is the side valley Cales Dale.

== Nature reserve ==
The river valley is part of the Derbyshire Dales National Nature Reserve and is popular with tourists who visit for its natural environment and wildlife. Natural England manages the reserve which covers five separate dales of the White Peak (Lathkill Dale, Cressbrook Dale, Hay Dale, Long Dale and Monk’s Dale). The dale includes two Sites of Special Scientific Interest (SSSIs) and areas designated as Open Access Land in the Countryside and Rights of Way Act 2000.

Lathkill Dale is known for its range of wildflower species (including orchids and the rare Jacob's ladder), butterflies, ancient woodland and the presence of birds of prey, dippers, woodpeckers and water voles.

The River Lathkill is a winterbourne stream (drying up in sections over summer). After heavy rain, clear river water rises up from sink-holes near Over Haddon and runs into deep pools known locally as The Blue Waters. Beyond this there are 12 weirs, which were built for trout fishing in Victorian times. In 1653 the poet and angler Charles Cotton wrote of the ‘Lathkin’:

it is by many degrees, the purest and most transparent stream that I ever saw, either at home or abroad, and breeds, it is said, the reddest and best Trouts in England.

— Charles Cotton, The Compleat Angler

== History ==
The medieval sheepwash bridge Conksbury Bridge now carries the road from Bakewell to Youlgreave. The nearby deserted medieval settlement at Conksbury was recorded in the Domesday Book (1086 AD) as Cranchesberie. The site of earthworks and buried remains of buildings is a Scheduled Monument. A Vickers Wellington bomber crashed near here in 1941.

Parsons Tor limestone crag is named after Reverend Robert Lomas of Monyash who fell to his death there, while riding his horse when drunk as he returned late at night from Bakewell in 1776.

Towards the top end of the valley Ricklow Quarry used to produce crinoidal limestone (rich in fossils 350 million years old), which looks like marble when polished and was popular with the Victorians. An old mill pond with a many stepped weir and a few mill stones are all that remains of Carters Mill (an old corn mill). The iron water wheel was removed from the mill for scrap during World War II.

The narrow stone Coal Pit Bridge at Youlgreave, the limestone footbridge at Over Haddon and the gritstone bridge at Nether Haddon all cross the River Lathkill and are Grade II listed.

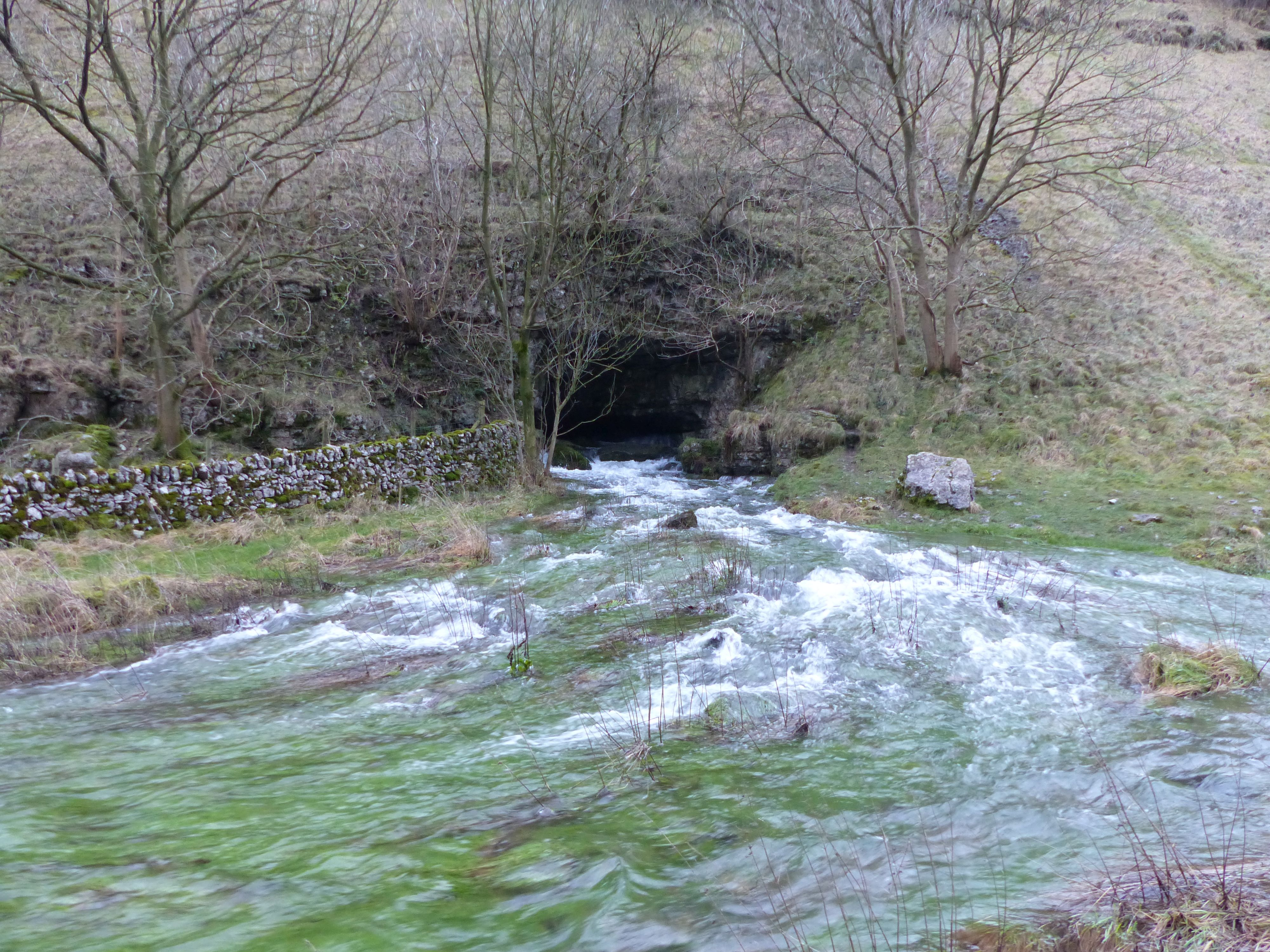
Lathkill Head Cave in wet conditions

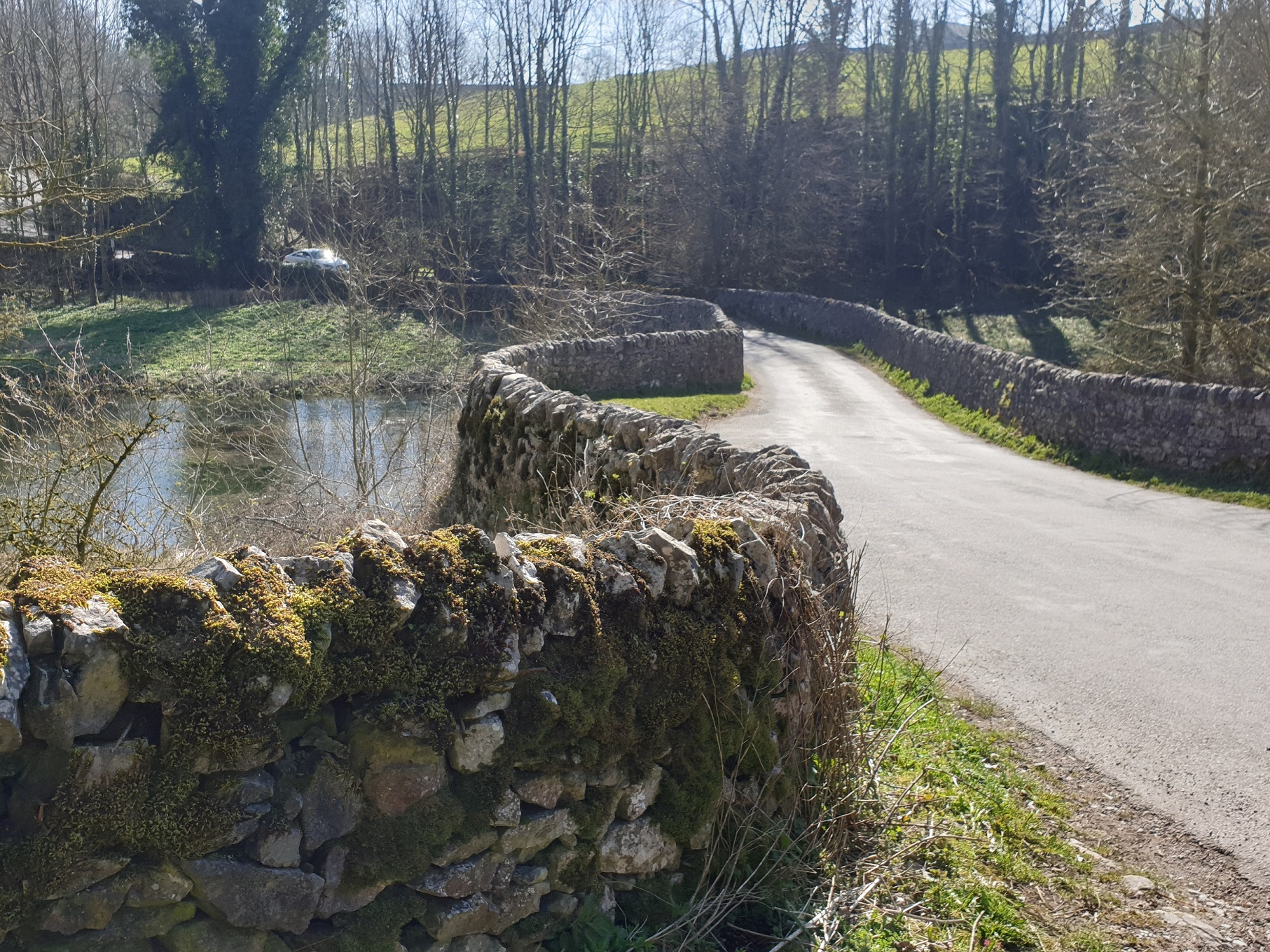
Conksbury Bridge

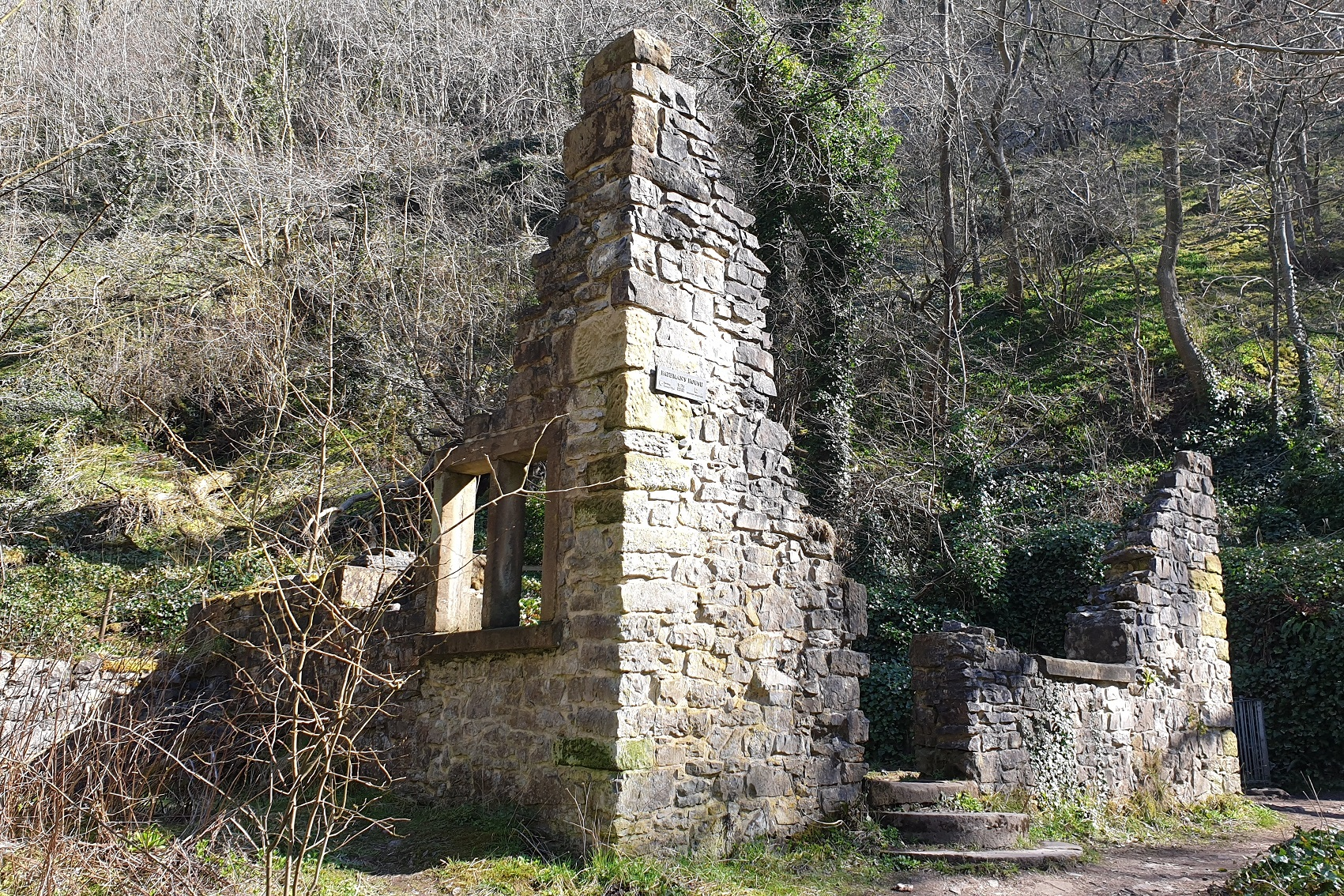
Bateman's House in Lathkill Dale

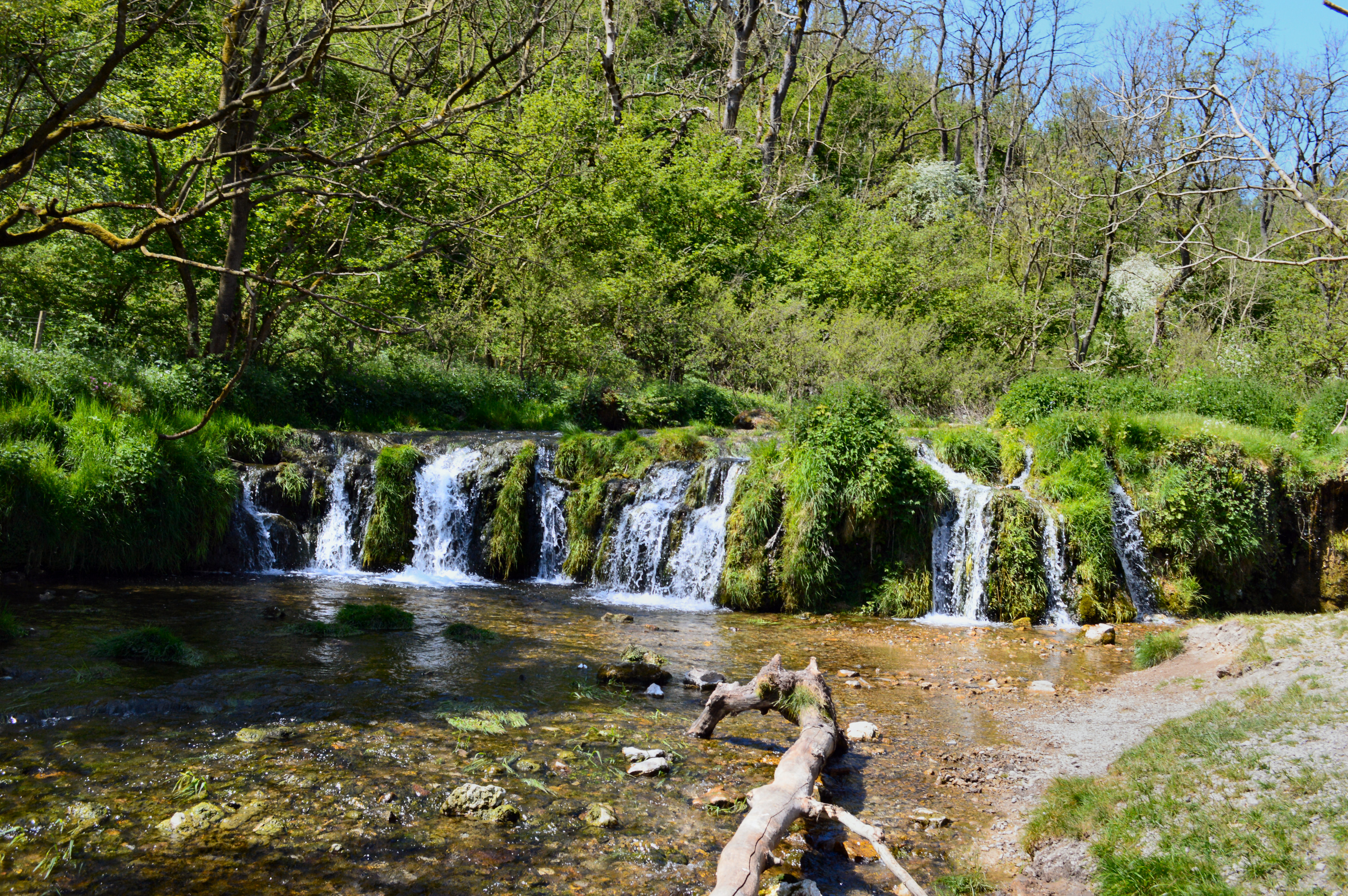
Waterfall

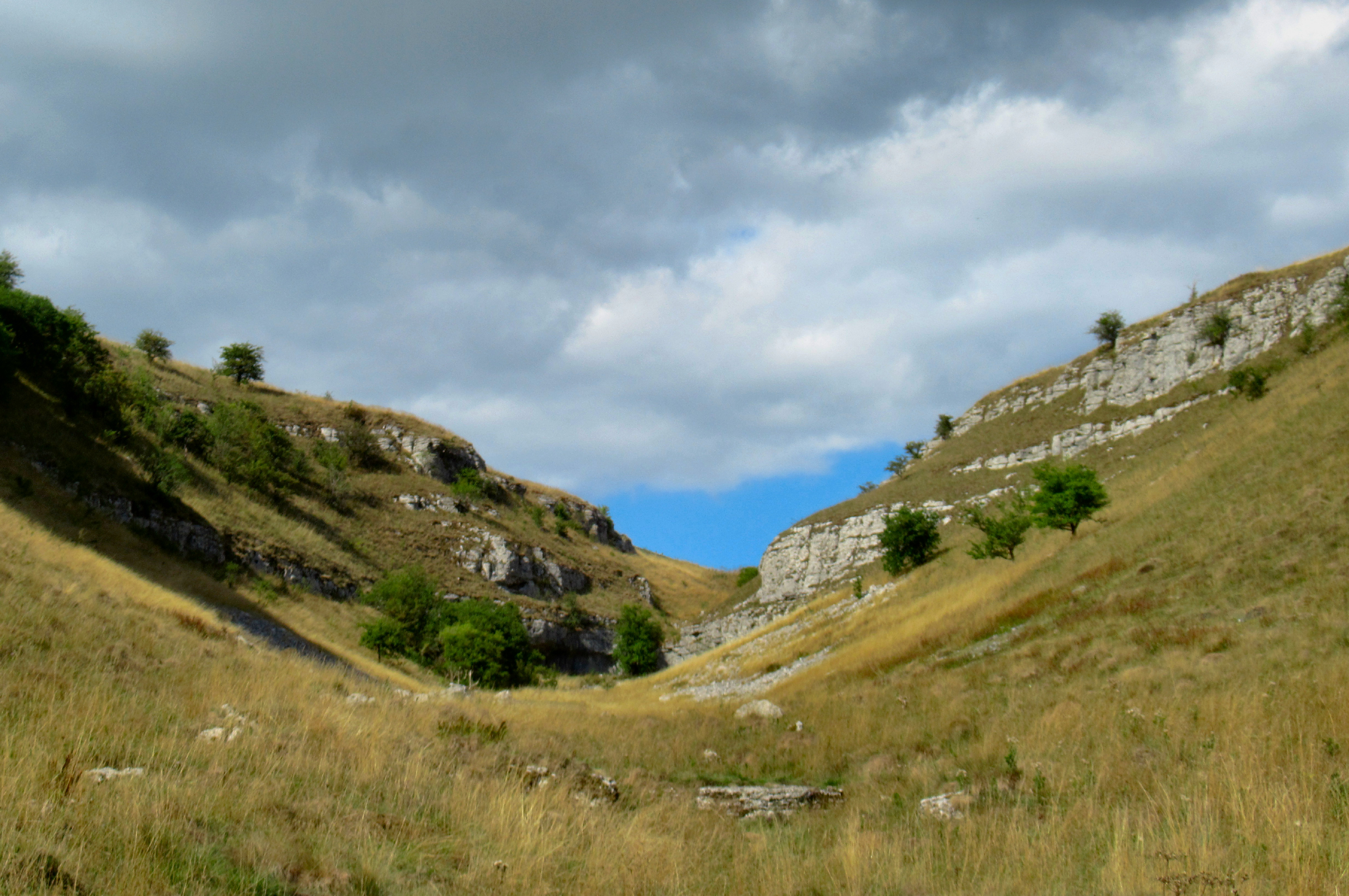
View of the upper dale

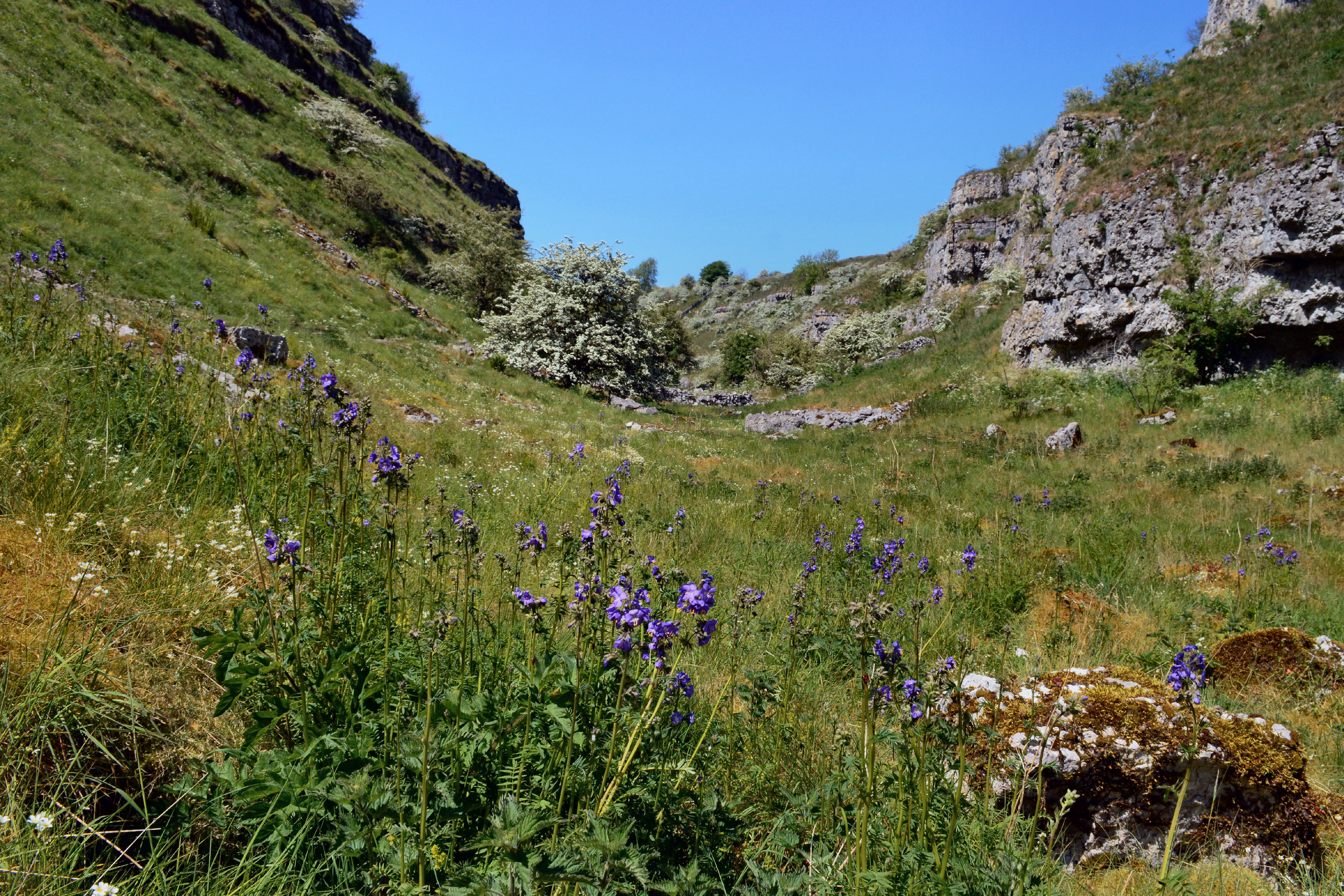
Jacob's-ladder in the upper dale

=== Lead mining ===
The dale has a long history of lead mining. Lathkill Dale and Mandale mines and soughs are a rare and well-preserved example of mining activity dating from the 13th century onwards. They include ruins of engine houses and an aqueduct and are a Scheduled Monument. In 1797 miners started to dig the Mandale Sough into the north side of the valley. The remains of the 19th-century Mandale Mine include the ruins of a pumphouse to drain the mines (using a steam Cornish pumping engine installed in 1847). Intensive mining led to underground flooding and the closure of Lathkill Mine. However. in 1825 James Bateman, the mine agent, brought in innovative equipment to overcome the flooding. A pumping engine was installed in a shaft under the building where he lived and known since as Bateman’s House. In 1836 he also erected a large and powerful waterwheel. Nevertheless, the mine became unprofitable and closed in 1842. Mandale Rake eventually closed in 1852 although individual miners continued working it until 1867.

== Access ==
There are parking areas near Monyash at the top end of Lathkill Dale. There is also a car park at Over Haddon leading to a steep road that descends into the dale. Roadside parking is limited at Conksbury Bridge and at Alport at the bottom end of the dale.
