= Long Dale =

Valley in the Derbyshire Peak District

- Long Dale & Gratton Dale
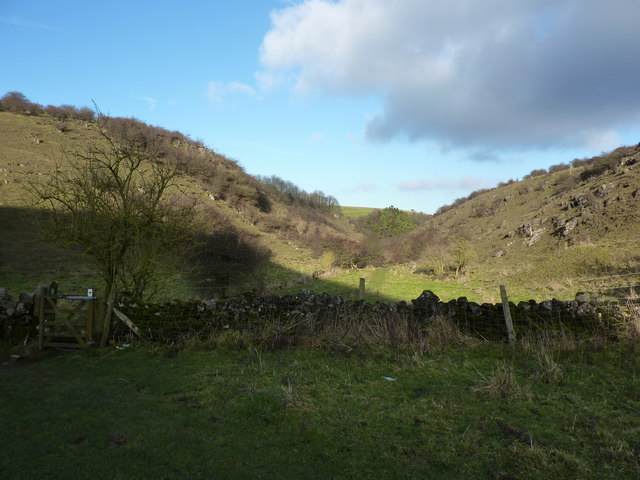
- Gratton Dale - Long Dale junction
- Length: 4 kilometres (2.5 mi) NW-SE and SW-NE
- Width: 250 metres (820 ft)
- Depth: 50 metres (164 ft)

Geography
- Location: Derbyshire, England
- Population centers: Elton
- Coordinates: 53.1396°N 1.7190°W
- Rivers: Rowlow Brook
- Interactive map of Long Dale

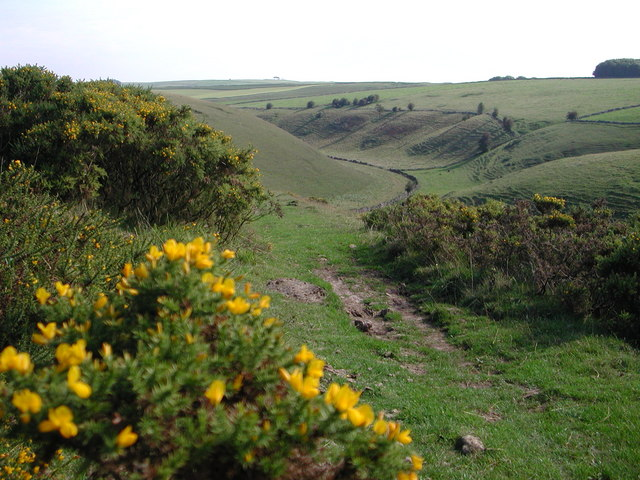
Long Dale Nature Reserve

Long Dale is a carboniferous limestone valley near the village of Elton, Derbyshire, in the Peak District of England. The dale is cut into the plateau of Gratton Moor and Smerrill Moor and lies to the north of the hamlet of Pikehall, which is the venue of the annual Y Not Festival. Midway down the valley it turns sharply left and is known as Gratton Dale. Most of the valley is dry but Rowlow Brook flows down the lower part of Gratton Dale towards Dale End and onwards to become the River Bradford at Youlgreave.

Long Dale is part of the Derbyshire Dales National Nature Reserve. Natural England manages the reserve which covers five separate dales of the White Peak (Lathkill Dale, Cressbrook Dale, Hay Dale, Long Dale and Monk's Dale). The reserve contains ash and elm woodland and shrubs including hawthorn and elder. Abundant flowers include mountain pansy. On the spoil heaps of the old lead mines there are rare flowers such as spring sandwort (Minuartia verna) and alpine pennycress (Thlaspi alpestre). Native grasses include meadow oat and carnation sedge interspersed with heather, bilberry and dwarf gorse. Long Dale & Gratton Dale is also a designated Site of Special Scientific Interest (SSSI).

Overlooking Long Dale, the Smerrill Moor, Smerrill Barn and Long Dale bowl barrows are protected Scheduled Monuments. These Bronze Age burial mounds are about 10m across. They were excavated by Thomas Bateman in 1857 and he found numerous human skeletons, flint tools and a decorated Beaker pottery drinking vessel.

On the east side of Gratton Dale are the remains of old lead mines (Rath Rake, Cowlica Rake, Dunnington, Hardbeat, Hardwork and Gatcliffe) which are a Scheduled Monument. Evidence of ancient surface lead mining comes from Roman brooches that were found in Victorian times at Cowlica Rake and Hardbeat mine. Records of intensive lead mining since the 1640s include disputed claims of mining rights. The remains include mine shafts, building ruins and earthworks.

Just south of the head of Gratton Dale are the remains of Mouldridge Grange, which was a medieval farmstead run by monks from the Augustinian priory. The remaining earthworks of buildings and enclosures are a Scheduled Monument.

There is a clear bridlepath along the length of the valley floor. The Pennine Bridleway runs parallel to Long Dale, about 1 km to the west. Long Dale is on the route of the 65 kilometres (40 mi) long Limey Way, which links up 20 Derbyshire dales.
