= Peter Dale (Derbyshire) =

Valley in the Derbyshire Peak District

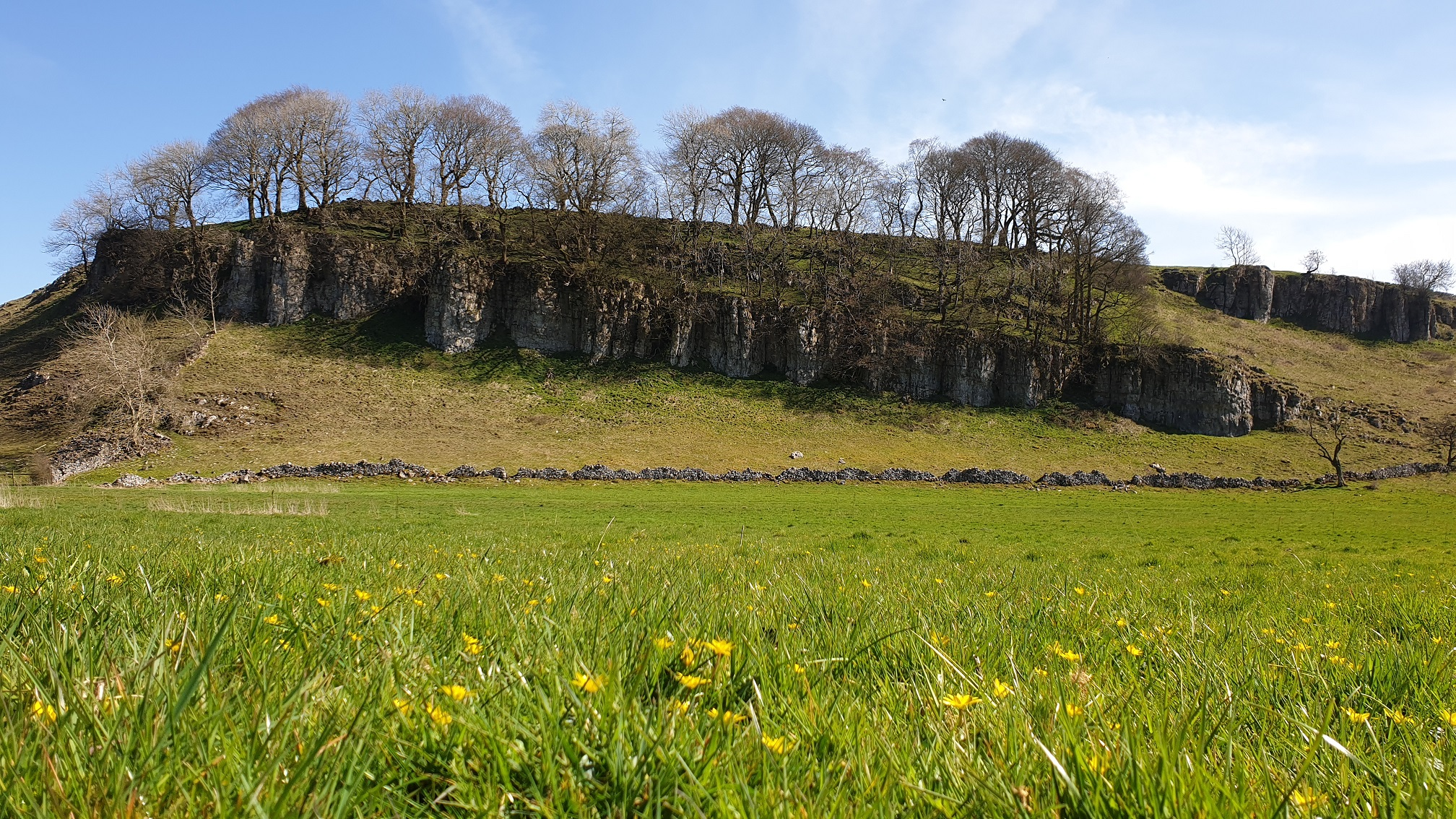
- Peter Dale on the Limestone Way
- Length: 1 mile (1.6 km) North-South
- Width: 150 metres (492 ft)
- Depth: 30 metres (98 ft)

Geography
- Location: Derbyshire, England
- Coordinates: 53.2809°N 1.8160°W
- Interactive map of Peter Dale

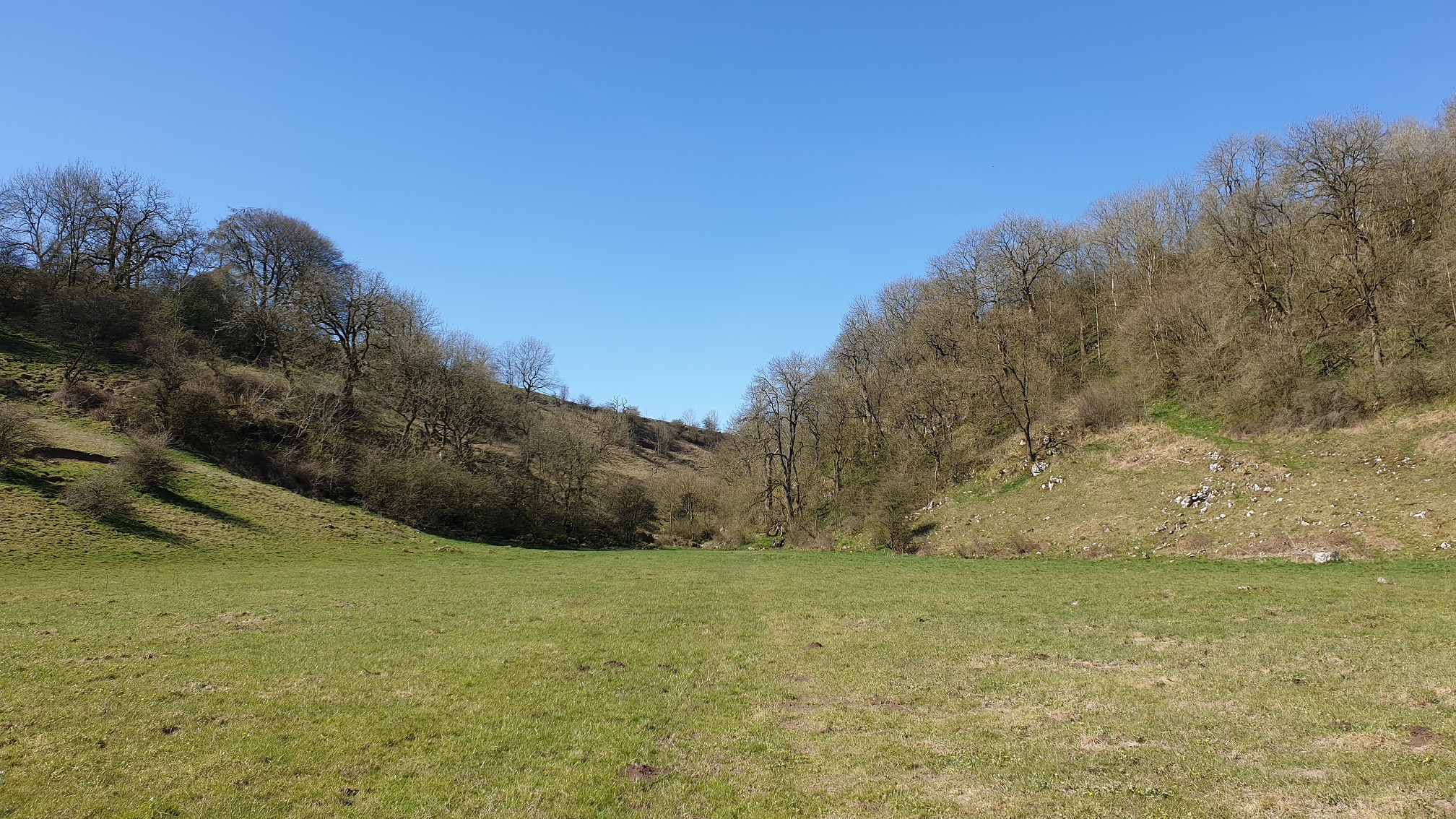
Southern end of Peter Dale

Peter Dale is a short dry crag-sided valley near Buxton, Derbyshire, in the Peak District of England. There is a farmland plateau on either side. The northern end of the valley leads into Hay Dale at Dale Head and the foot of the valley leads into Monk's Dale. Hay Dale and Monk's Dale are both part of the Derbyshire Dales National Nature Reserve managed by Natural England. The Carboniferous limestone rocks of all these dales were formed 350 million years ago from the shells and sediments of a tropical sea. The landscape was then sculpted by the ice sheets from the last Ice Age 20,000 years ago.

The walking along the flat valley floor is easy except for a couple of short rock-strewn sections. The Limestone Way long-distance footpath runs along the length of the gentle valley floor. The Peak District Boundary Walk trail passes the northern end of the valley. The Pennine Bridleway runs across the southern end and then parallel to the dale about 1km to the east (through the hamlet of Wheston). Where the Limestone Way crosses the A623 road (about 1 km north of Hay Dale), the route of the old Batham Gate Roman road runs east–west.

Peter Dale's limestone cliffs are well-suited to rock climbing, with 25 graded routes on Main Crag.

Access into Peter Dale from the south can be made from the hamlet of Wormhill along the Pennine Bridleway. From the north there is a footpath from the village of Peak Forest (on the A623 road) through Dam Dale and Hay Dale.
