= Hay Dale =

Valley in the Derbyshire Peak District

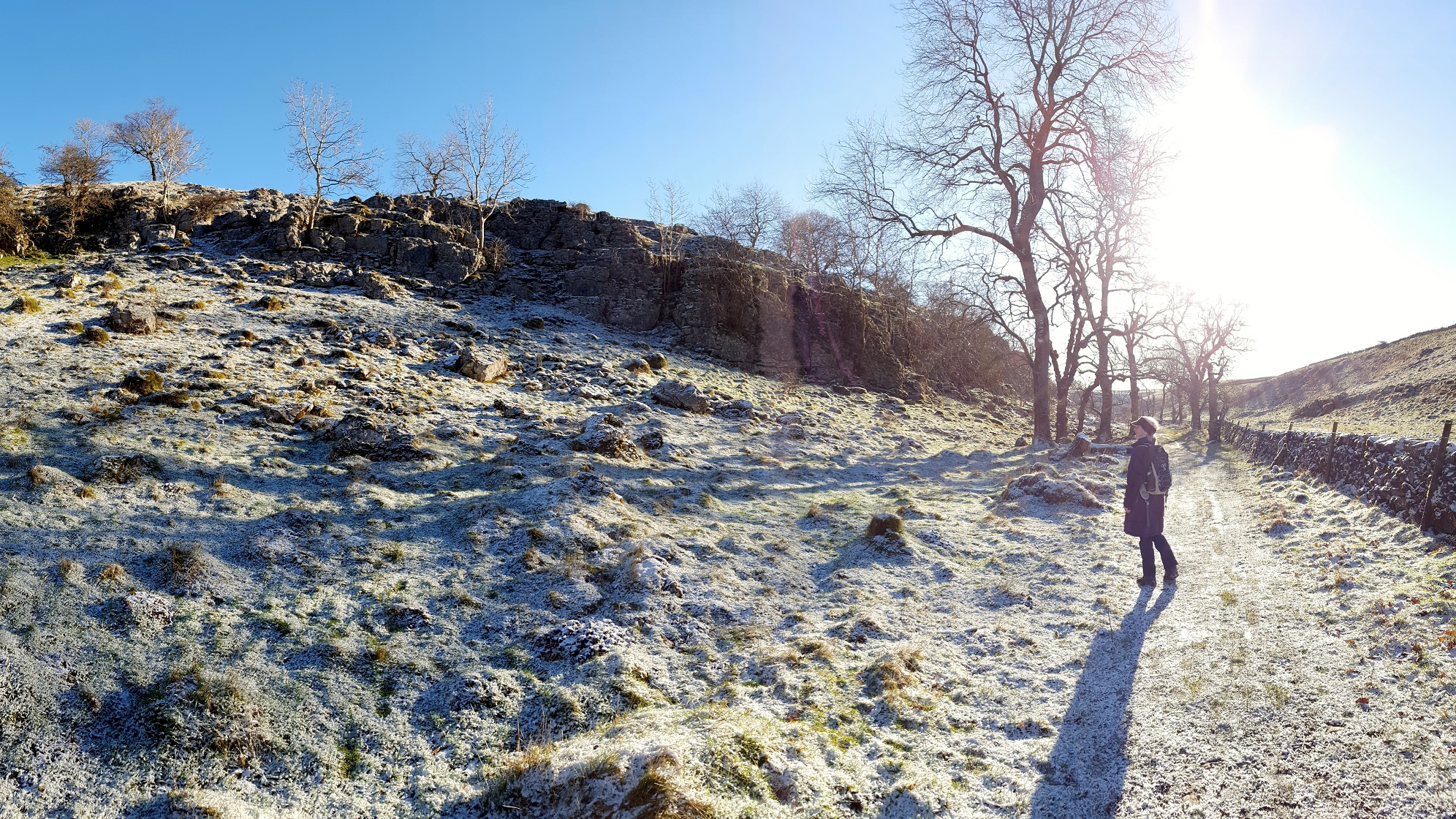
- Hay Dale on the Limestone Way
- Length: 0.75 miles (1 km) north–south
- Width: 120 metres (394 ft)
- Depth: 30 metres (98 ft)

Geography
- Location: Derbyshire, England
- Coordinates: 53.2902°N 1.8207°W
- Interactive map of Hay Dale

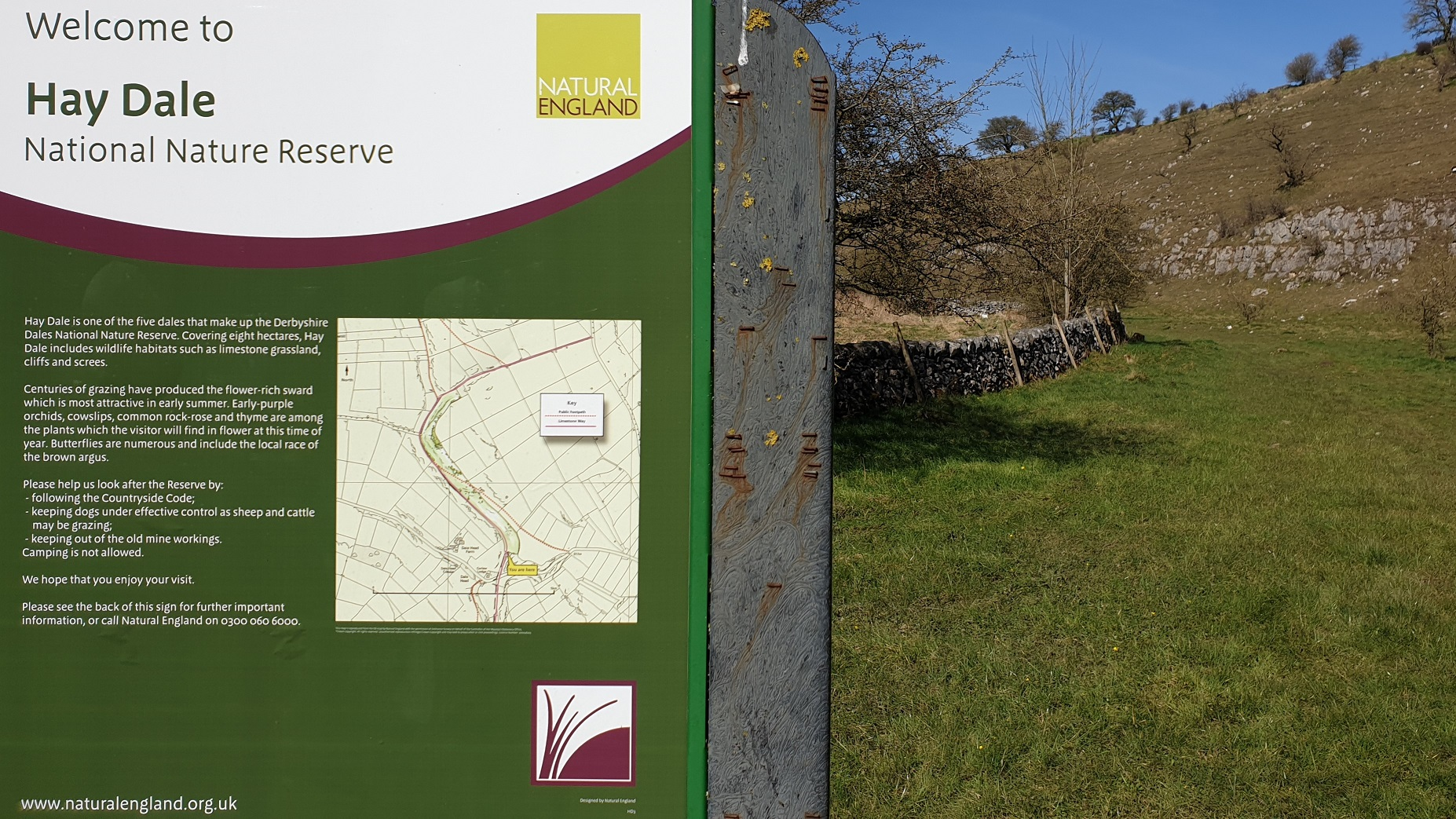
Hay Dale Nature Reserve

Hay Dale is a short dry valley near Buxton, Derbyshire, in the Peak District of England. It is part of a longer valley that runs for approximately 4 miles (6.4 km) north–south from Peak Forest (on the A623 road) to the River Wye at Millers Dale. This valley has several names along its length: from the northern end running downhill these are Dam Dale, Hay Dale, Peter Dale and Monk's Dale. There is a farmland plateau on either side.

Hay Dale is part of the Derbyshire Dales National Nature Reserve. Natural England manages the reserve which covers five separate dales of the White Peak (Lathkill Dale, Cressbrook Dale, Hay Dale, Long Dale and Monk's Dale). The Carboniferous limestone rocks of the reserve were formed 350 million years ago from the shells and sediments of a tropical sea. The landscape was then sculpted by the ice sheets from the last Ice Age 20,000 years ago. The reserve contains ash woodland, limestone grassland and many wildflowers including early purple orchid, cowslip, common rock rose and thyme. Butterflies are abundant and include the brown argus.

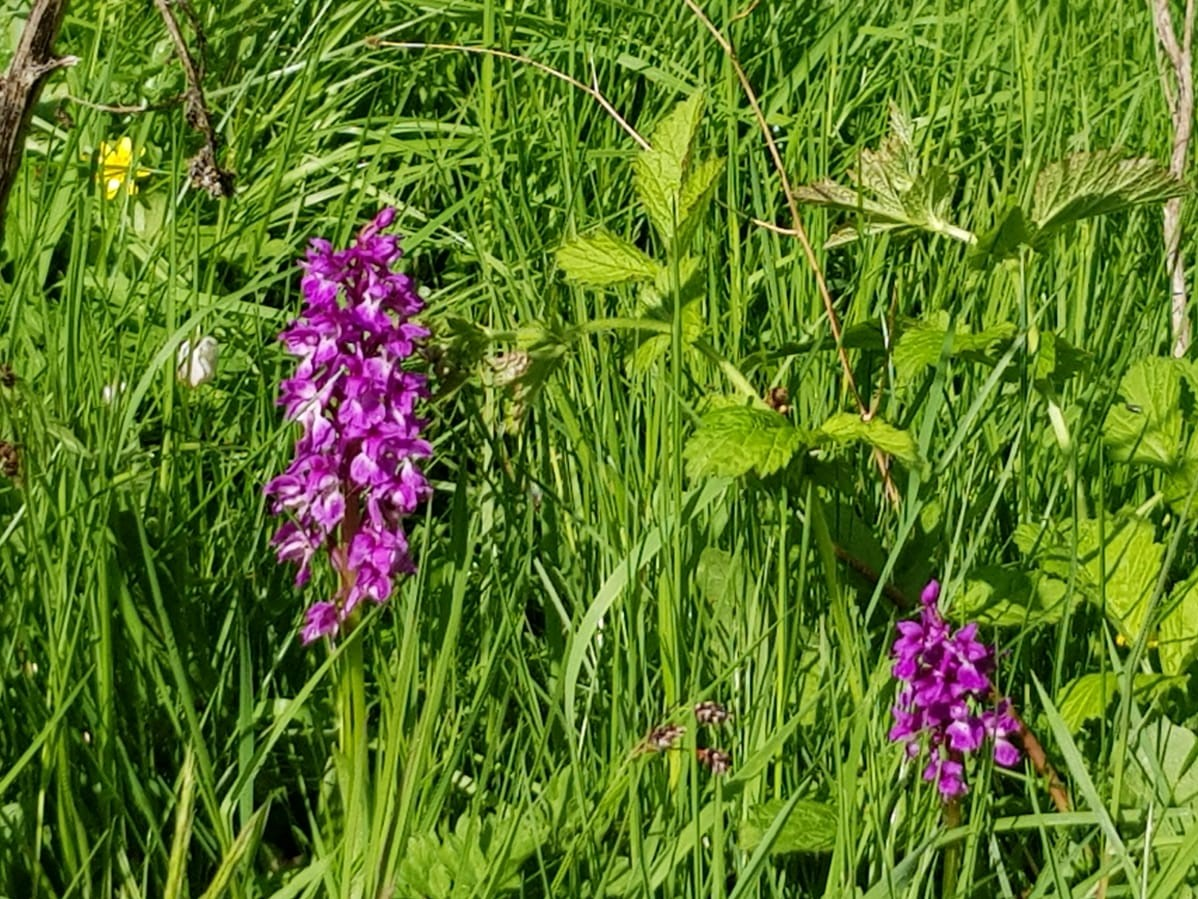
Early Purple Orchid in Hay Dale

The Limestone Way and the Peak District Boundary Walk long-distance footpaths run along the length of the gentle valley floor. The Pennine Bridleway crosses the northern end of the dale, dividing it from Dam Dale. Where the Limestone Way crosses the A623 road about 1 mile (1.6 km) north of Hay Dale, the route of the old Batham Gate Roman road runs east–west.

Access into Hay Dale from the north is via a footpath from Peak Forest through Dam Dale. From the south, the dale can be reached from the village of Wormhill along the Pennine Bridleway and through Peter Dale. A minor road running west from Wheston marks the southern end of Hay Dale and the start of Peter Dale.
