= Wheston =

Village in Derbyshire, England

Coordinates: 53.28°N 1.80°W

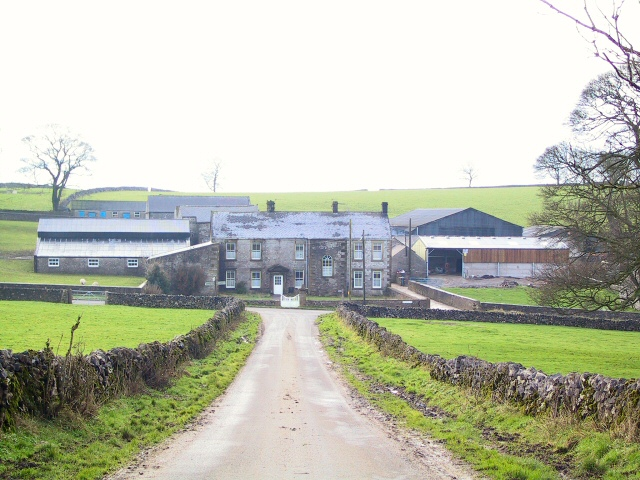
- Wheston Hall Farm

- Location within Derbyshire
- OS grid reference: SK1376
- District: Derbyshire Dales
- Shire county: Derbyshire
- Region: East Midlands
- Country: England
- Sovereign state: United Kingdom
- Post town: BAKEWELL
- Postcode district: SK17
- Dialling code: 01298
- Police: Derbyshire
- Fire: Derbyshire
- Ambulance: East Midlands
- UK Parliament: High Peak

Wheston is a village and civil parish in the Derbyshire Peak District. Notable features include Wheston Hall and the Wheston Cross. The cross, which survives intact, is more than 11 feet (3.4 m) high. It probably dates from the 14th century and marked the way from Tideswell to Buxton along the Forest Road. Images of the Madonna and Child and the Crucifixion are carved into it. The cross is both a scheduled monument and a Grade II* listed building.

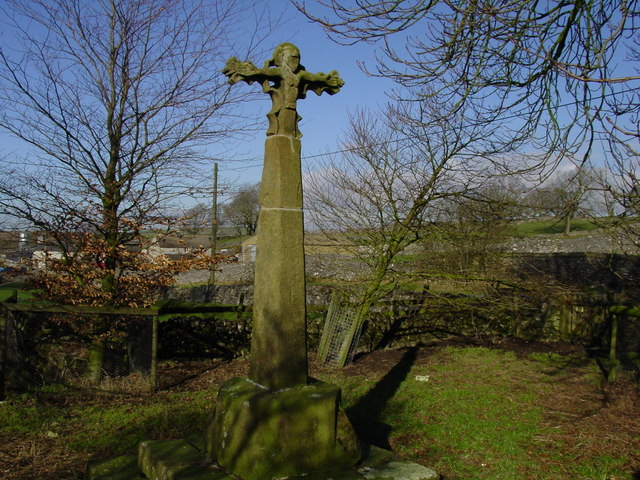
Wheston Cross

The village was formerly known as Whestone.
