= Deep Dale =

Valley in the Derbyshire Peak District

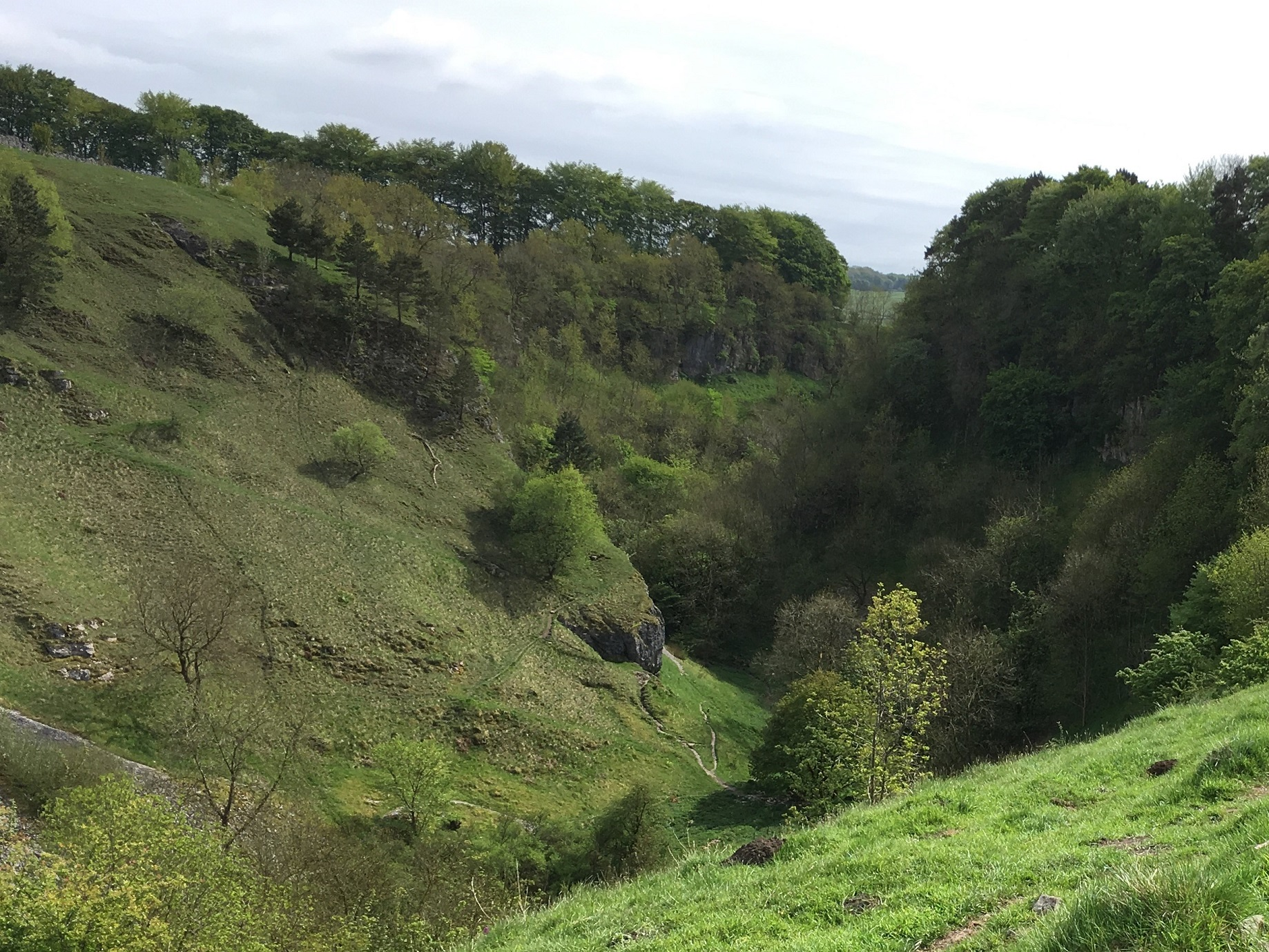
- Deep Dale near King Sterndale
- Length: 2 miles (3 km)
- Width: 200 metres (656 ft)
- Depth: 70 metres (230 ft)

Geography
- Location: Derbyshire, England
- Coordinates: 53.2362°N 1.8532°W
- Rivers: A winterbourne stream
- Interactive map of Deep Dale

Deep Dale is a short, steep-sided gorge near Buxton, Derbyshire, in the Peak District of England. It is distinct from another Deep Dale, near Sheldon, 4 miles (6.4 km) to the east.

The dale is cut into a plateau of farmland and lies just south west of the hamlet of King Sterndale. The head of the valley is called Back Dale and there is a side valley named Horseshoe Dale. Wye Dale is at the foot of the valley to the north. The valley is dry over the summer but has a winterbourne stream, fed by the Deepdale Side Resurgence spring and another spring by Thirst House Cave further up the valley. The stream runs into the River Wye.

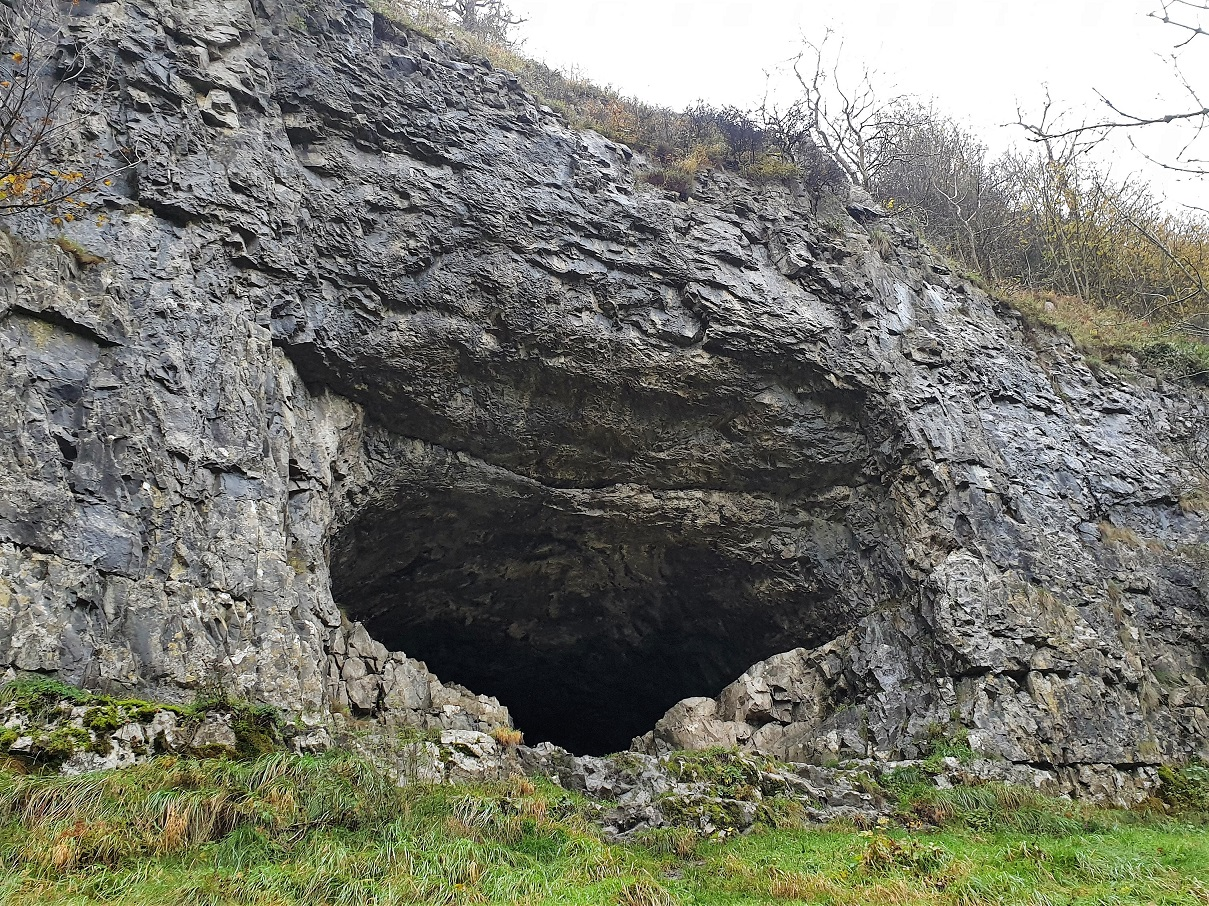
Entrance to Thirst House Cave

Thirst House Cave's name is derived from Th'Hurst House as it was previously called Hob Hurst House.It is named after a goblin believed to live in the cave (not to be confused with Hob Hurst's House prehistoric burial mound on Beeley Moor). The cave is 58 metres (190 ft) long. Local men Micah Salt and Robert Milletts excavated the cave in the 1880s and 1890s, after boys found a bear's skull in the cave. They discovered Roman artefacts, including bronze jewellery, enamelled brooches, pottery fragments, coins and an iron and bone knife. Many of these objects are on display in the Buxton Museum.

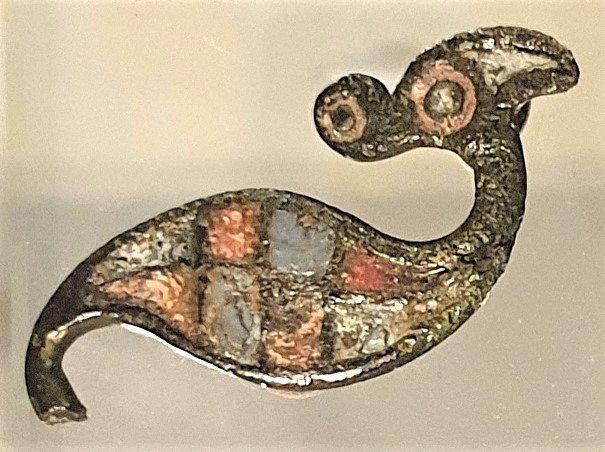
Roman enamel bronze brooch found in Thirst House Cave

Deep Dale and Topley Pike is a protected nature reserve, which is overseen by the Derbyshire Wildlife Trust. The reserve contains whitebeam, yew, ash and hazel trees and limestone fern on the lower scree slopes, with bilberry, cowberry and wild flowers on the steep upper slopes, including bloody crane's bill, clustered bellflower, rock rose and Nottingham catchfly. Without sheep grazing, the native grasses of meadow oat and carnation sedge flourish. The limestone cliffs are an attractive habitat for kestrels and jackdaws. Topley Pike and Deep Dale is also a designated Site of Special Scientific Interest (SSSI).

The Buxton to Chelmorton section of the Midshires Way long-distance footpath runs across Deep Dale. The Priest's Way path runs through the valley floor of Deep Dale and Horseshoe Dale. The Peak District Boundary Walk route comes down Deep Dale and along Wye Dale before heading north at Chee Dale.

The crags of carboniferous limestone in Deep Dale are popular with rock climbers. There are four buttresses along the valley with many climbing routes.

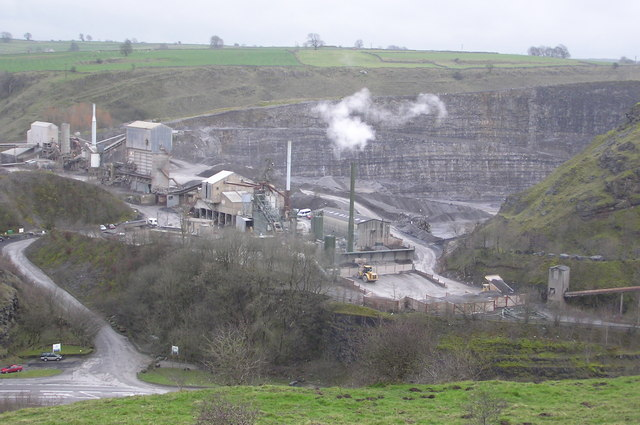
Topley Pike Limestone Quarry

Topley Pike Quarry is a large limestone quarry at the north west end of Deep Dale. It was opened in 1907 by Messrs. Newton Chambers & Co. and is currently operated by Tarmac Roadstone Holdings Ltd. A drystone wall runs along the length of the floor of the dale and marks the boundary between the mining rights of Buxton Mining Liberty and the Combined Liberty of Taddington, Flagg, Monyash and Upper Haddon.

Access into the deep gorge is limited. Wye Dale car park (over the A6 road at the north end of Deep Dale) is the easiest place for visitors to walk from. There are four other entry points over stiles into the dale and its nature reserve from neighbouring dales (Chelmorton, King Sterndale, Horseshoe Dale and Brierlow Dale), although these have steep slopes.

The footpath through the lower section of Deep Dale is closed from 2017 until beyond 2026 for natural restoration, following the removal of a large spoil tip (waste from the quarry). A diversion is in place to the east.
