= Cressbrook Dale =

Valley in the Derbyshire Peak District

- Ravensdale
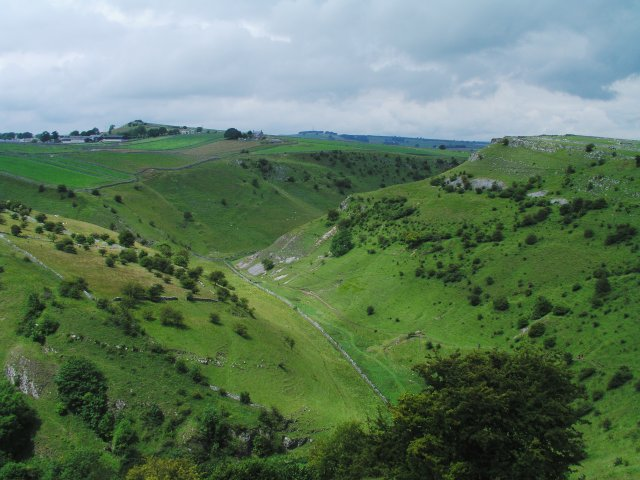
- Cressbrook Dale Nature Reserve
- Length: 2.5 miles (4 km) North-South
- Width: 450 metres (1,476 ft)
- Depth: 100 metres (328 ft)

Geography
- Location: Derbyshire, England
- Coordinates: 53.2586°N 1.7466°W
- Rivers: Cress Brook
- Interactive map of Cressbrook Dale

Cressbrook Dale (also called Ravensdale) is a dry carboniferous limestone gorge near Bakewell, Derbyshire, in the Peak District of England. The dale is cut into a plateau of farmland and lies to the south east of the village of Litton. Cressbrook village is at the foot of the valley to the south.

The valley is dry over the summer but has a winterbourne stream (Cress Brook) which runs into the mill pond at Cressbrook Mill and then into the River Wye in Water-cum-Jolly Dale. The Cress Brook powered the original 18th century mill.

== Nature reserve ==
Cressbrook Dale is part of the Derbyshire Dales National Nature Reserve. Natural England manages the reserve which covers five separate dales of the White Peak (Lathkill Dale, Cressbrook Dale, Hay Dale, Long Dale and Monk’s Dale). It is also an Important Plant Area. The reserve contains ash and wych elm woodland and shrubs including dog’s mercury, field maple, guelder rose, hazel, bird cherry and dogwood. Wildflowers in the reserve include lily-of-the-valley, ramsons and bloody cranesbill. There are broad areas of scrub with hawthorn, blackthorn, buckthorn and rose. Meadow oat and carnation sedge spread across the ungrazed grasslands, with patches of rare bird’s-foot sedge (Carex ornithopoda). Cressbrook Dale is also a designated Site of Special Scientific Interest (SSSI). It is especially important for the lichens growing on the limestone.

== Geology ==
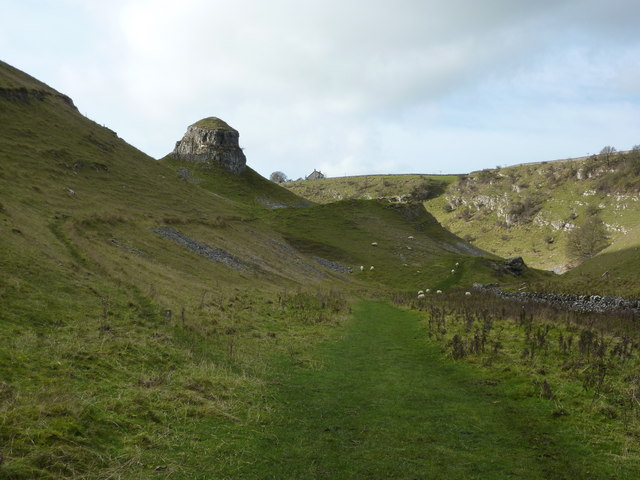
Peter's Stone in Cressbrook Dale

The sequence of limestones in Cressbrook Dale make it an important geological site. The layers were deposited in a warm shallow sea in the Brigantian stage of the Carboniferous period (around 330 million years ago). The Carboniferous Limestone contains important fossils. Several layers of volcanic rock show that volcanoes were once active in Derbyshire.

Peter's Stone (named after its resemblance to the dome shape of St Peter's Basilica in Rome) is the prominent limestone knoll at the northern end of the valley (the Wardlow Mires). It used to be called Gibbet Rock where the last gallows in the county once stood. The gibbet was an iron cage holding the dead bodies of executed criminals as a deterrent to others. One of the last cases of gibbeting was of Anthony Lingard from Tideswell in 1815. He was convicted and executed in Derby for killing Hannah Oliver, the toll-keeper at Wardlow Mires, for a pair of red boots. His corpse was hung in chains on Peter’s Stone.

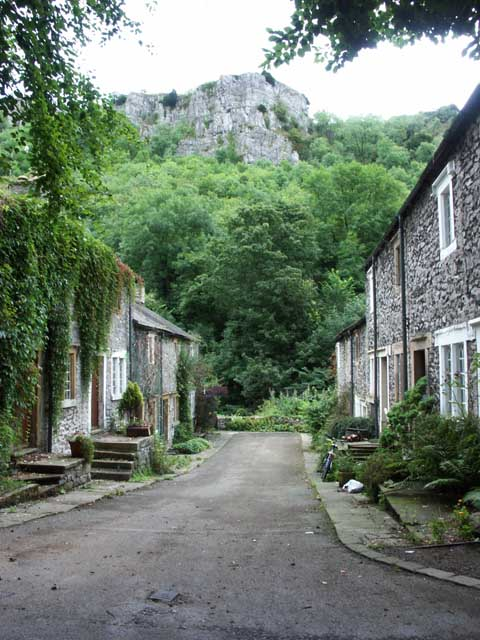
Ravensdale Cottages

High on the cliff above Ravensdale Cottages is Ravencliffe Cave, which is 8 metres (26 ft) deep. In the early 20th century, Stone Age, Bronze Age and Roman artefacts were recovered from the cave including polished stone axes, an arrowhead, pottery fragments, beads and bronze brooches as well as human and animal remains.

Ravensdale Cliff has numerous low- to middle-grade rock climbing routes up to 46 metres (151 ft) long on the main buttress. The cliffs of Water-cum-Jolly (at the foot of Cressbrook Dale) are an accessible and extensive area for climbers with over 400 routes.

== Industry ==
The large lead mining area at Tansley Dale, towards the head of the valley, is a protected Scheduled Monument. The visible remains are ruined stone walls and earthworks. Further south in Cressbrook Dale around the settlement of Ravensdale there is extensive evidence of lead mining in the crags on the western side of the dale all the way from the lead rakes above Tansley Dale to Cressbrook itself. This probably dates from the 1500s up until the purchase of Cressbrook Mill and associated lands, including the dale, by Messrs Phillips and Co in 1814. Ravensdale Cottages (known locally as 'The Wick') in the middle of the valley are two terraces of cottages built by William Newton to house the workers at Cressbrook Mill. They date from 1823 and are Grade II listed buildings.

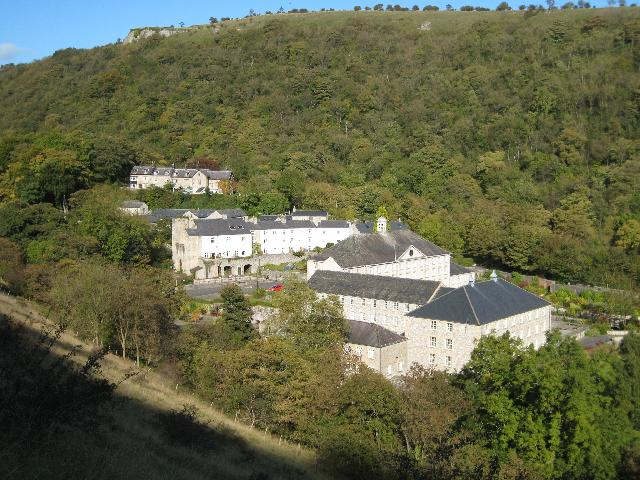
Cressbrook Mill

Cressbrook Mill dominates the view at the foot of the valley by the River Wye. The cotton mill was built in 1814–15 by William Newton on behalf on J L Philips. It replaced the original mill built in 1779 by Sir Richard Arkwright, which burnt down in 1785. The clock on the pediment and the octagonal cupola were added in 1837 to commemorate the Queen Victoria's coronation. The mill closed in 1965. It is a Grade II* listed building.

== Access ==
There is an easy-going footpath along the length of the valley floor. The Monsal Trail bridleway runs along the Wye valley at the southern end of Cressbrook Dale. There is access into the dale from both ends, as well as two footpaths from Litton village into the west side of the valley. There is some roadside parking in Upperdale near the southern foot of the dale.
