= Monk's Dale =

Valley in the Derbyshire Peak District

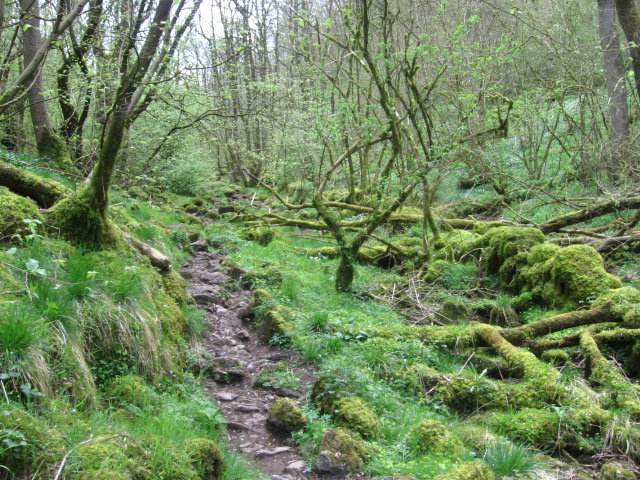
- Monk's Dale Nature Reserve
- Length: 1.6 miles (3 km) North-South
- Width: 350 metres (1,148 ft)
- Depth: 70 metres (230 ft)

Geography
- Location: Derbyshire, England
- Coordinates: 53.2633°N 1.8000°W
- Rivers: A winterbourne stream
- Interactive map of Monk's Dale

Monk's Dale is a short steep-sided dry gorge near Buxton, Derbyshire, in the Peak District of England. The dale is cut into a plateau of farmland and lies to the east of the village of Wormhill. The head of the valley leads into Peter Dale to the north. Miller's Dale is at the foot of the valley to the south.

The dale is named after monks of Lenton Priory (a Benedictine monastery in Nottingham). During the 12th century the priory was granted the income from a large area of north Derbyshire by William Peverel. 14th-century carved stones (of the low septum, or stone screen, dividing the chancel from the nave) are all that remains of the monks' grange.

The valley is dry over the summer but has a winterbourne stream which runs into the River Wye at Miller's Dale.

Monk's Dale is part of the Derbyshire Dales National Nature Reserve. Natural England manages the reserve which covers five separate dales of the White Peak (Lathkill Dale, Cressbrook Dale, Hay Dale, Long Dale and Monk's Dale). The reserve contains ash and elm woodland and shrubs including herb Paris, bird cherry and dogwood. Uncommon flowers in the shady dale include dark red helleborine. Native grasses include meadow oat, glaucous sedge, oat grass, cottongrass, knapweed and upright brome. Monk's Dale is also a designated Site of Special Scientific Interest (SSSI). It is especially important for the lichens on the shaded, limestone cliffs.

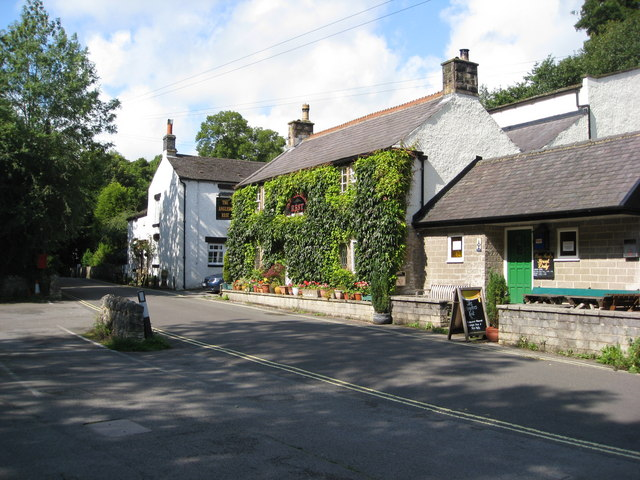
The Anglers Rest at Miller's Dale

There are two Grade II listed buildings at Miller's Dale at the southern end of the valley: The Anglers Rest pub from the 1700s and the Church of St Anne from 1879.

The footpath along the length of the valley floor is challenging rough terrain for walkers. The Limestone Way long-distance footpath and Pennine Bridleway run along the same route on the plateau to the east of Monk's Dale. The Monsal Trail bridleway runs along the Wye Valley at the southern end of Monk's Dale.

Access into the deep gorge is limited to the entry points at each end. Footpaths from the Wormhill village, from Peter Dale and from the Limestone Way converge at the northern end. At the southern foot of the dale, there is a large car park at Miller's Dale station on the Monsal Trail.
