= Derbyshire Dales National Nature Reserve =

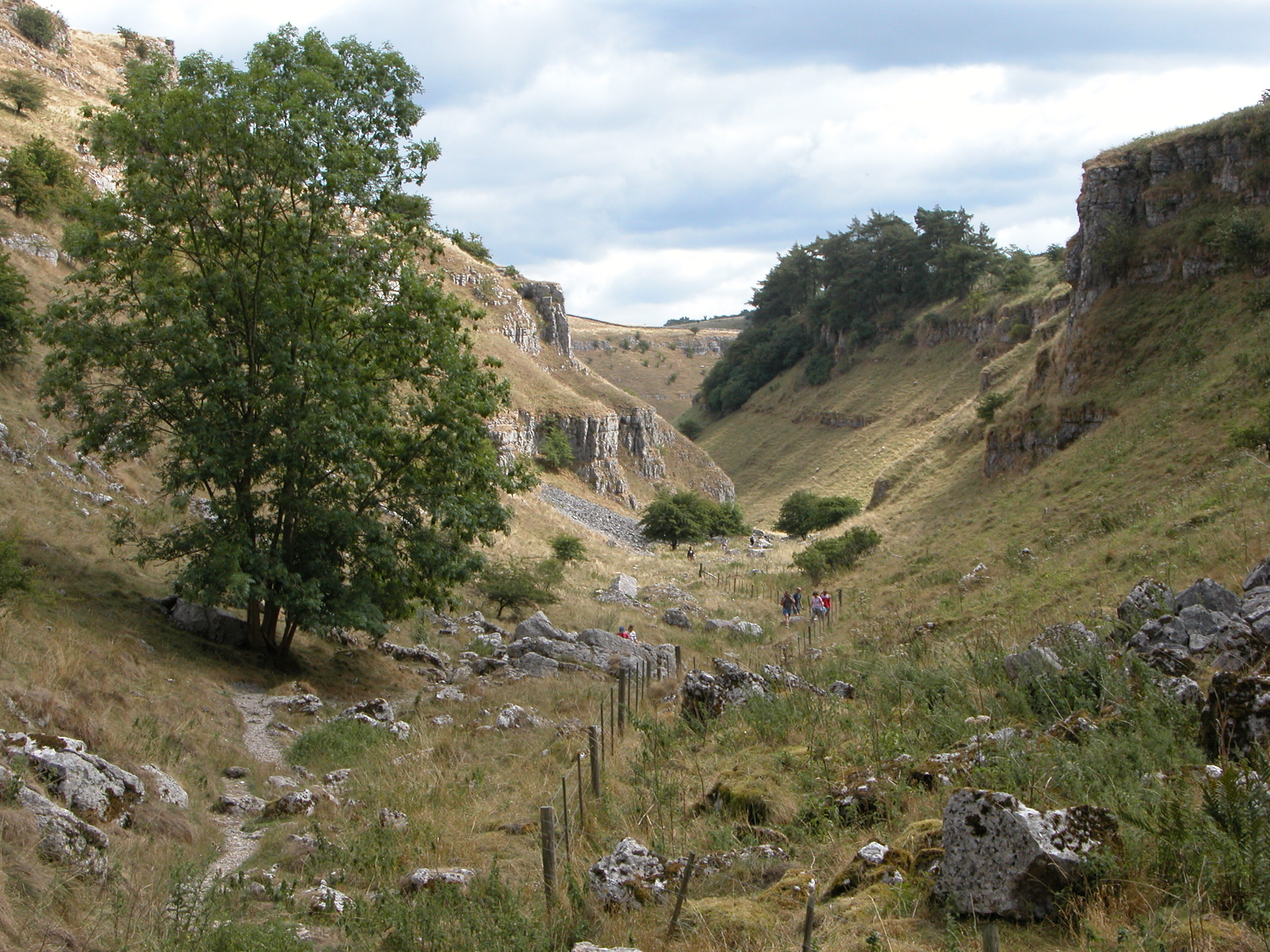
Lathkill Dale

The Derbyshire Dales National Nature Reserve is a series of unconnected limestone dales in the Peak District National Park. It is managed by Natural England and has a permanent staff of wardens who carry out conservation works and ensure the dales are usable for recreation.

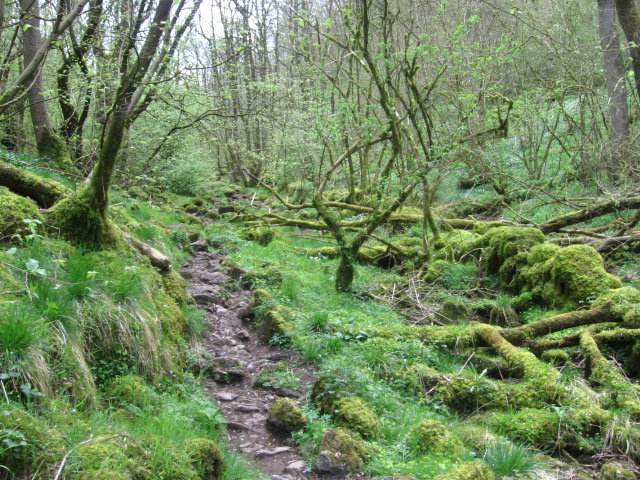
Monk's Dale

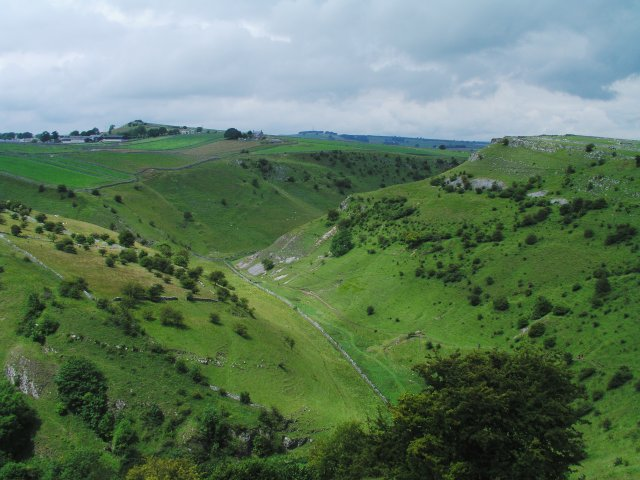
Cressbrook Dale

The dales are:

- Lathkill Dale (53.1886°N 1.7257°W)
- Cressbrook Dale (53.2617°N 1.7438°W)
- Monk's Dale (53.2662°N 1.7997°W)
- Long Dale (53.1388°N 1.7164°W)
- Hay Dale (53.2890°N 1.8203°W)

They are all in the White Peak national character area, of which dales are an integral part. The dales are a mixture of grassland, woodland and scrub; some also have streams (generally winterbournes). They are a haven for biodiversity and many Sites of Special Scientific Interest (SSSI) lie partly or wholly within the reserve boundaries. There are a number of Biodiversity Action Plan species and habitats present.

Dippers are common along the River Lathkill, and ravens and buzzards are regularly seen around the dale. The Monyash end of Lathkill Dale is well known for the flower Jacob's ladder (Polemonium caeruleum), which is common in gardens but rare in the wild. There are also a number of orchids found in all the dales.

The sites are also a good place to study geology, with many fossils within the limestone. There are also a number of historical sites. Lathkill Dale has many industrial workings (now abandoned and derelict), and there are many interpretation boards in the dale explaining the history.

Lathkill Dale is one of the most easily accessible and most frequently visited of the Derbyshire dales, and has a good path for a large section of the dale, whereas other dales are inaccessible to less mobile people, as paths are steep and rocky for large sections (particularly Monk's Dale).
