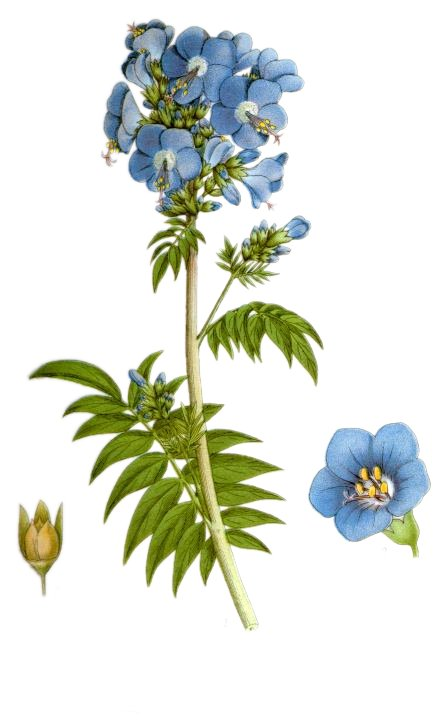

Scientific classification
- Kingdom: Plantae
- Clade: Embryophytes
- Clade: Tracheophytes
- Clade: Angiosperms
- Clade: Eudicots
- Clade: Asterids
- Order: Ericales
- Family: Polemoniaceae
- Genus: Polemonium
- Species: P. caeruleum

Binomial name
- Polemonium caeruleum L.

Synonyms
- Polemonium laxiflorum Kitam.

= Polemonium caeruleum =

Species of plant

Polemonium caeruleum, known as Jacob's-ladder or Greek valerian, is a hardy perennial flowering plant. The plant produces cup-shaped, blue or white flowers. It is native to temperate regions of Europe. It is the type species of the phlox family, Polemoniaceae.

== Growth ==
The plant usually reaches 45–60 cm (18–24 in) tall and broad, but some occasionally grow taller than 90 cm (35 in). It can grow in North American hardiness zone 2.

== Habitat ==
The plant is native to damp grasslands, woodlands, meadows and rocky areas in temperate areas of Europe and northern Asia.

== Cultivation ==
The plant normally prefers soil that is rich in moisture and lime with partial shade. Normally hardy, some cultivars (e.g. 'Blue Pearl') behave as tender biennials, which means they are effectively annuals in cooler climates (below hardiness zone 6).

The plant is known to have a few landscape uses as well such as attracting beneficial insects. The plant itself is convenient for container planting due to the shape of its growth. The flower may be presented as a cut flower or foliage and may be added to bouquets for its pleasant smell. It can be grown in a perennial border or rock garden.

Cultivars include:

- 'Album' (white flowered)
- 'Blue Pearl'
- 'Brise d'Anjou'
- 'White Pearl' (white flowered)
- 'Snow and Sapphires' (variegated foliage)

The plant does not have serious insect or disease problems. Leaf spot and powdery mildew can be problems, particularly in humid climates. The foliage may scorch if the plant gets too much sunlight. The leaflet tips will brown if soils are allowed to dry out. The foliage will generally decline and become less attractive as the summer progresses. It is important to keep an eye out for slugs.

== Other uses ==
Polemonium caeruleum was voted the county flower of Derbyshire in 2002 following a poll by the wild plant conservation charity Plantlife.

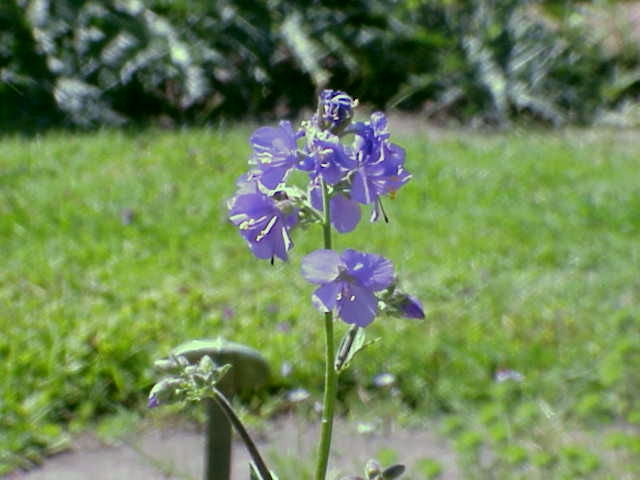

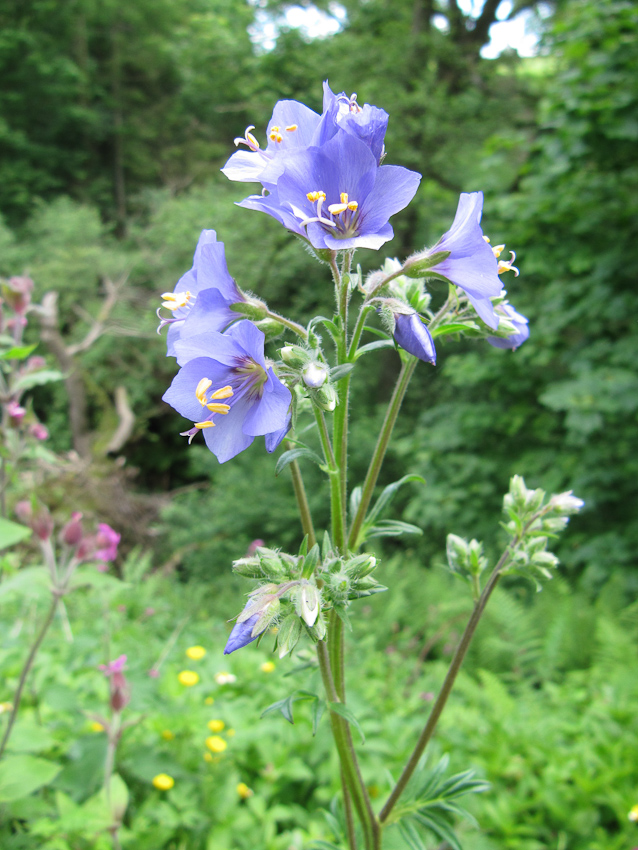

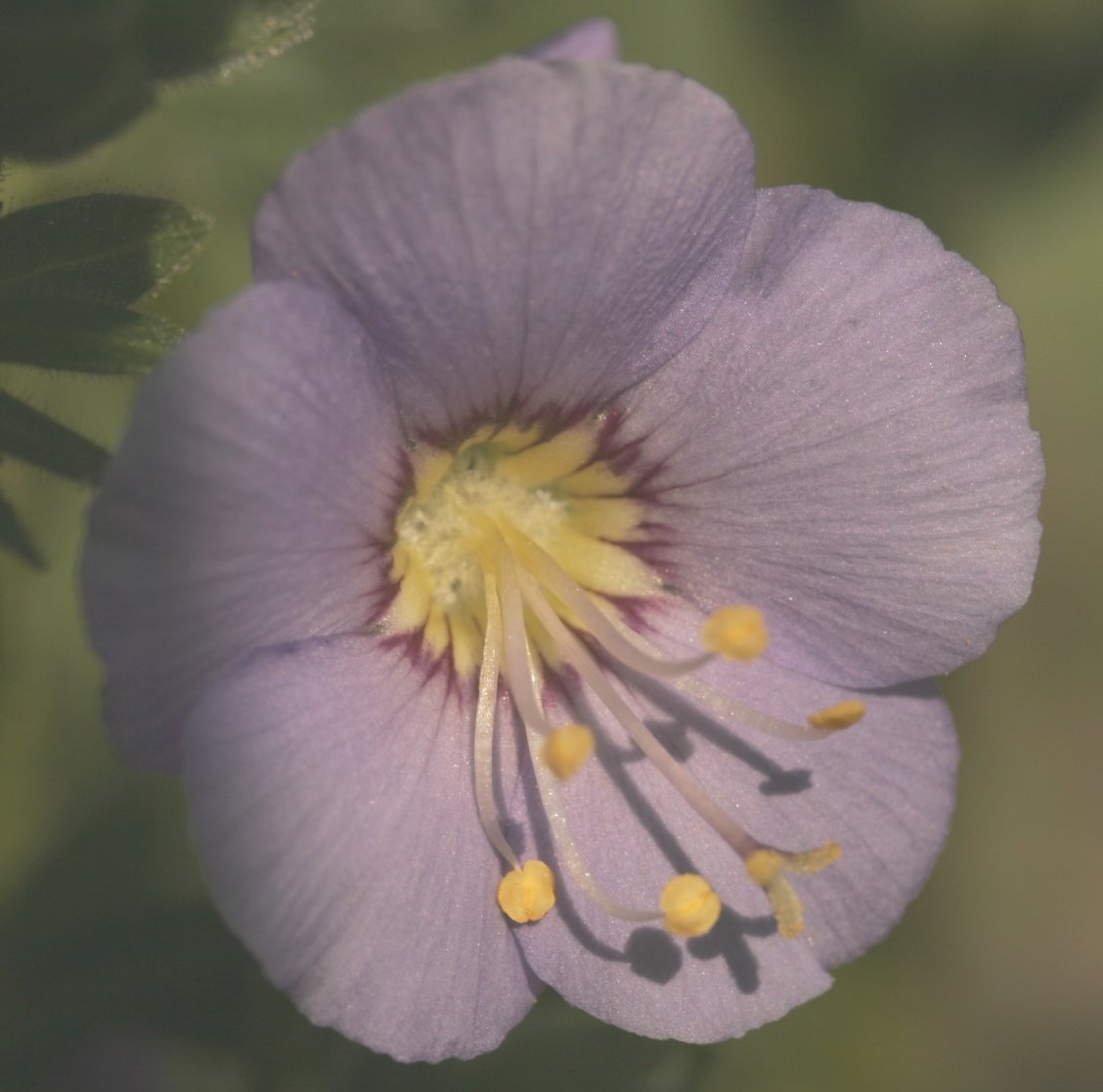

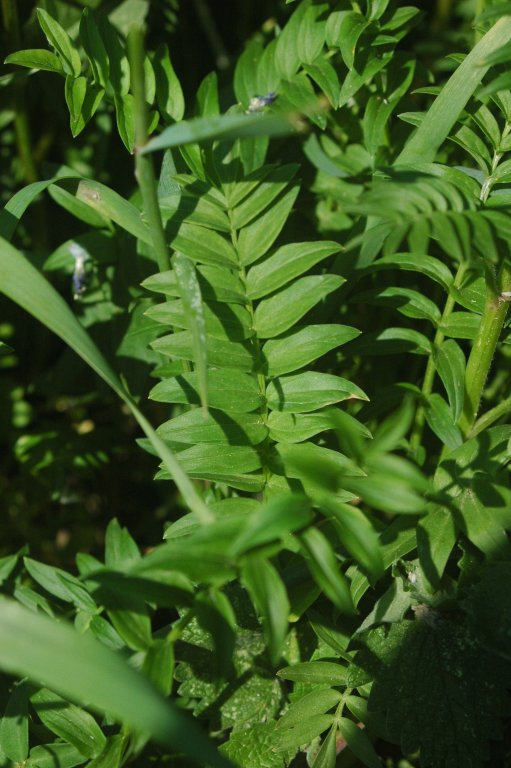

== External list ==
- Biggs, Matthew (2006). Vegetables, Herbs & Fruit: An Illustrated Encyclopedia. Firefly Books Ltd. pp. 324–325. ISBN 1-55407-126-7.
- Bremness, Lesley (2002). Herbs. Smithsonian Handbooks. Dorling Kindersley, Inc. p. 205. ISBN 0-7894-9391-8.
- Howes, F. N. (1979). Plants and Beekeeping. Faber Paperbacks. p. 161. ISBN 0-571-11358-3.
