= White Peak =

Plateau in the Peak District, England

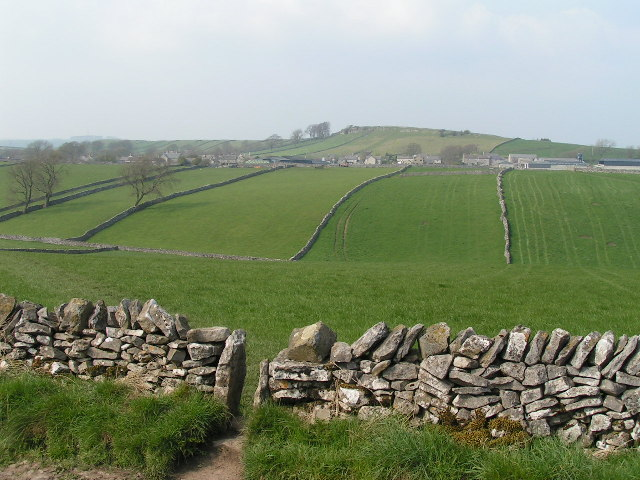
Typical White Peak plateau landscape, near Litton

The White Peak, also known as the Low Peak, is a limestone plateau that forms the central and southern part of the Peak District in England. It is mostly between 270 metres (900 ft) and 430 metres (1,400 ft) above sea-level and is enclosed by the higher altitude Dark Peak (also known as the High Peak) to the west, north and east.

== Area ==
Broadly speaking, the White Peak covers the Derbyshire and Staffordshire parts of the Peak District from the Hope Valley southwards to the Weaver Hills near the Churnet Valley. As defined by Natural England, the White Peak national character area covers 52,860 hectares (204 sq mi) and includes the area approximately bounded by Ashbourne, Buxton, Castleton, Matlock and Wirksworth.

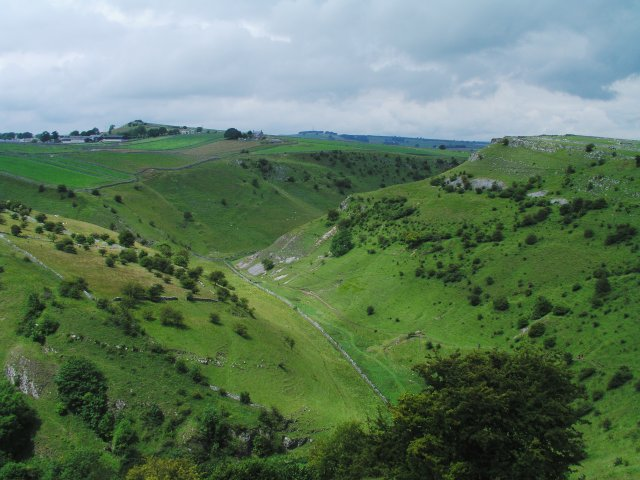
Cressbrook Dale, one of several steep-sided valleys that cut into the limestone plateau

== Geology and soils ==
The geology of the White Peak has its origins in the Carboniferous Period, when the area was under a shallow sea that was fringed by reefs, leading to thick deposits of shelly calcareous material. Over millions of years the area rose up and subsided several times, leading to muddy, sandy and peaty deposits overlying the calcareous shells. Compression turned the deposits into rock - the shells became limestone, and the overlying deposits became gritstone, shales and coal. Further uplifting and folding raised the area into an anticline (the Derbyshire Dome), then subsequent erosion removed the younger deposits to expose the limestone. The limestone consists of three types: pale grey, thickly bedded, gently dipping shelf limestone of much of the central plateau; darker grey, more thinly bedded, more folded basin limestone in the south west; and hard, unbedded reef limestone that forms cone-like hills on the plateau periphery.

Limestone is porous, so caves, limestone gorges and dry valleys are common features of the area. The soils are mostly derived from loess deposited by cold winds in the last part of the last glacial period. Notable valleys in the White Peak include Dovedale, Monsal Dale, Lathkill Dale and the Manifold Valley. The area is of interest to geologists, since much of the underlying strata have been exposed by extensive quarrying, and can be seen in the old railway cuttings along the Monsal Trail through Monsal Dale and Millers Dale.

== Ecology ==
The generally good quality loess soil means much of the area is agriculturally productive pasture, though hay meadows - containing species such as Rhinanthus minor (yellow rattle) and Galium verum (lady’s bedstraw)- occur in places. On steep slopes and higher points where soils are shallower and pasture improvement difficult, species-rich calcareous grassland can be found, containing species such as Orchis mascula (early purple orchid), Primula veris (cowslip) and Thymus serpyllum (wild thyme). On high ground leaching has resulted in acidic grassland - where Viola lutea (mountain pansy) and Vaccinium myrtillus (bilberry) occur - and, in a few places, remnants of limestone heath. Minimally grazed north-facing slopes of dales are a national stronghold of Polemonium caeruleum (Jacob's ladder), the county flower of Derbyshire. The White Peak is also a stronghold for ash woodlands, which became dominant in the dales as a result of dutch elm disease, agriculture, mining and quarrying. The outbreak of ash dieback has resulted in the planting of other limestone specialists including hazel, rock whitebeam, wych elm and lime.

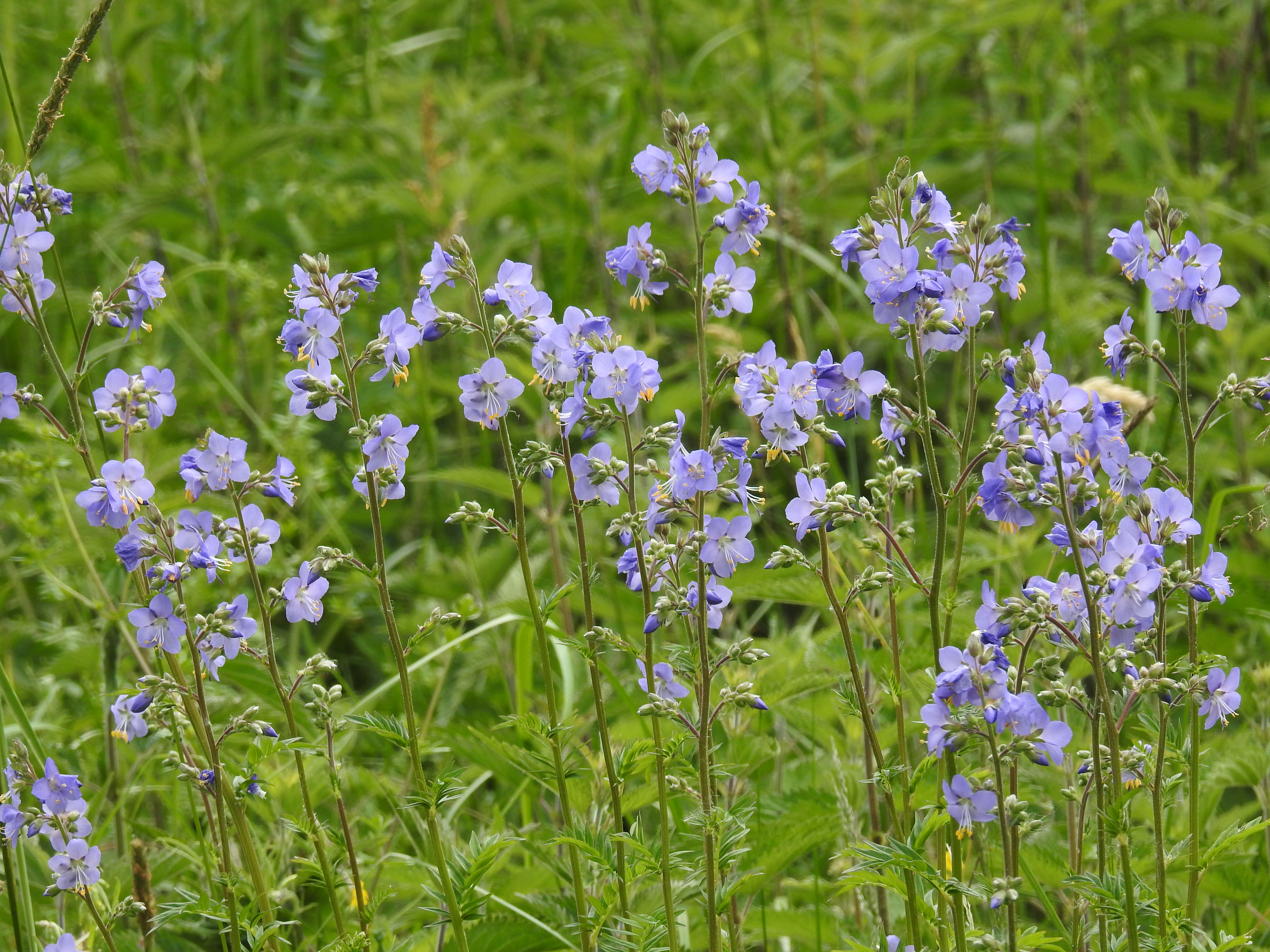
The White Peak is a national stronghold of Polemonium caeruleum (Jacob's ladder)

== Settlements ==
The largest towns in the White Peak are outside the area of the Peak District national park. These towns include Matlock, Wirksworth and Buxton, while Bakewell and most of the villages in the park are in the White Peak area. Around the areas of Tideswell, Hartington, Flagg, Chelmorton and Youlgrave, long thin fields created by the enclosure of medieval strip fields can be seen.

== Footpaths ==
The region is rich in footpaths, bridleways and green tracks that give access to the area. Longer-distance routes include the Limestone Way, the Peak District Boundary Walk and the Pennine Bridleway, and former railway trackbeds such as the Monsal Trail, the High Peak Trail, the Tissington Trail and the Manifold Way.
