= Millers Dale =

Valley in the Derbyshire Peak District

Coordinates: 53.256°N 1.791°W

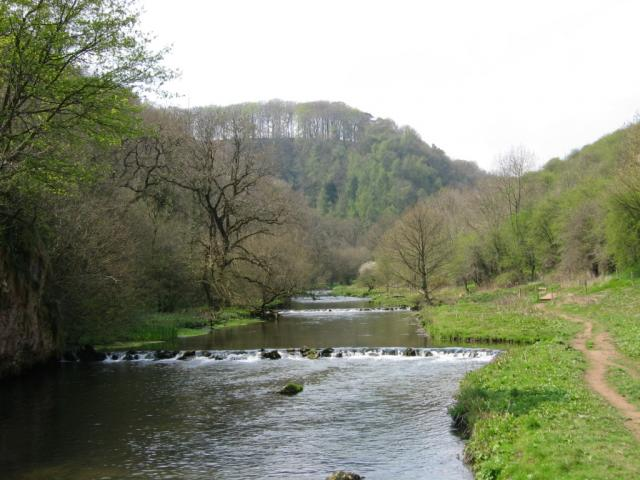
The river Wye at Millers Dale

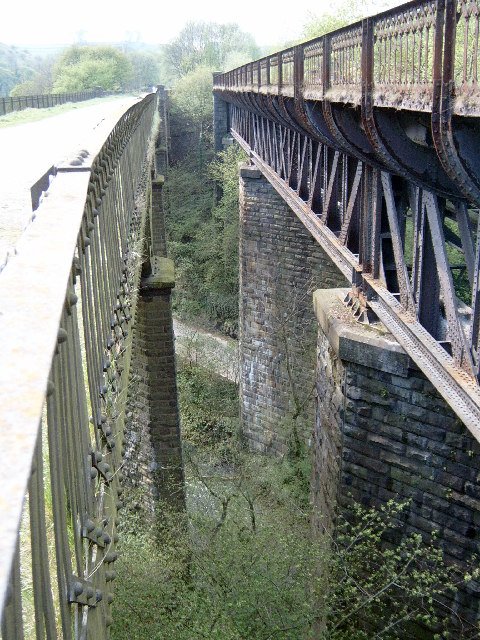
The twin viaducts at Millers Dale; the left one carries the Monsal Trail

Millers Dale (Ordnance Survey: Miller's Dale) is a valley on the River Wye in Derbyshire, England, where there is also a hamlet of the same name.

It is a popular beauty spot in the Peak District of England, much of the area being preserved as a Site of Special Scientific Interest. Nearby are Ravenstor and Chee Dale, both popular with rock-climbers. Just to the north of the dale lie the village of Wormhill and the lesser-known valleys of Peter Dale and Monk's Dale, the latter being listed as a Site of Special Scientific Interest and a nature reserve.

A local landmark is the viaduct, first built by the Midland Railway in 1866. Increasing traffic meant that a second viaduct parallel to the first was built in 1905, increasing the number of tracks to four. Millers Dale station was at the junction where passengers for Buxton joined or left the trains between London and Manchester. The station closed in 1967 and the line closed in the following year. Large sections of the trackbed now form part of the Monsal Trail, a cycle and walking trail.

Northwards from Millers Dale the line entered the two Chee Tor tunnels (401 and 94 yards), separated by a 50-foot-high (15 m) bridge over the River Wye, then along a ledge cut into the rock face, before entering Rusher Cutting tunnel (121 yards), crossing the Wye again by another viaduct. The line here was immensely difficult and expensive to construct, skirting, as it did, the base of the 300-foot (91 m) high ciff of Chee Tor. Chee number 1 was, until May 2011, sealed off for safety reasons, but it is now possible to walk through all three tunnels. Further on was the triangular junction for Buxton via Blackwell Mill, before continuing to Peak Forest.

The area is of great interest to geologists, particularly where the strata have been exposed by quarries and railway cuttings. In Station Quarry two layers of limestone can be seen, separated by a bed of shale. At one point there is a dip in the lower layer, possibly from a watercourse, millions of years ago. This is filled with the shale and a large limestone boulder can be seen within it. Elsewhere in the area there are signs of lava flows from long-ago volcanic activity.

== In art and literature ==
A painting by Thomas Allom, and engraved by J. J. Hinchliff, which appears to show a couple by the waterside at sunset, is accompanied by a poetical illustration by Letitia Elizabeth Landon in Fisher's Drawing Room Scrap Book, 1838.

== See also ==
- Manchester, Buxton, Matlock and Midlands Junction Railway
- Cycleways in England
