= Robert Pursglove =

English bishop (1504–1579)

Robert Pursglove (alias "Sylvester"; 1504–1579) was an English sixteenth-century bishop.

== Life ==
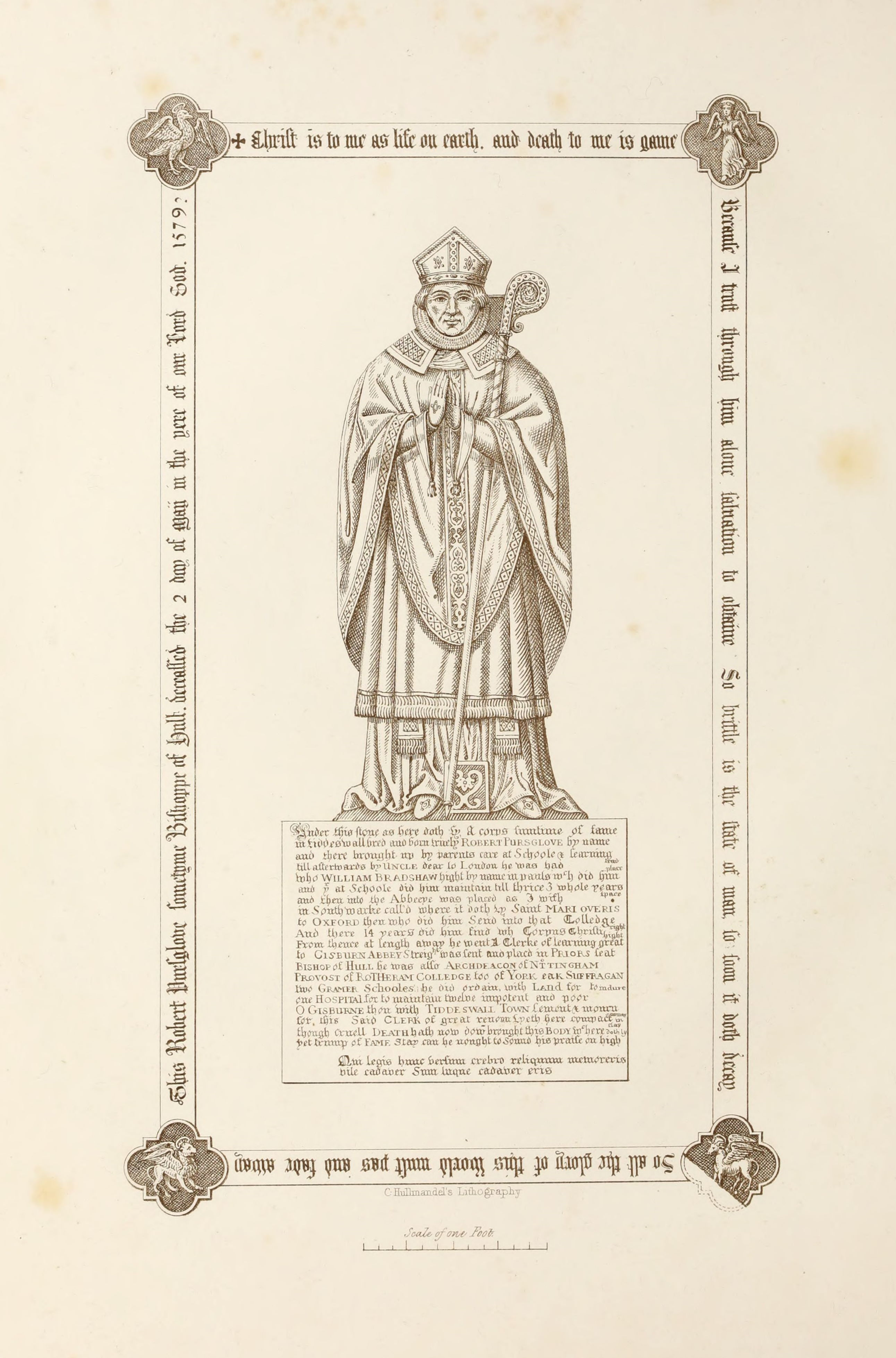
Monumental brass to Robert Pursglove in the church of St John the Baptist, Tideswell, Derbyshire

He was born in Tideswell, Derbyshire, the son of Adam Pursglove; his mother's name was Bradshawe. By a maternal uncle, William Bradshawe, he was sent to St Paul's School, London, where he spent nine years. He became an Augustinian canon regular, after a short spell at St Mary Overy in London, then a priory, he went on to Corpus Christi College, Oxford. He remained in Oxford until about 1532. He was Prior of Gisborough, by about 1534. The king appointed him suffragan Bishop of Hull in 1538. In 1540, he surrendered Gisborough Priory to the king, and was given a pension.

He was made provost of Jesus College, Rotherham in 1544. It was suppressed early in the reign of Edward VI, and he became then Archdeacon of Nottingham. His tenure of the bishopric of Hull continued under Robert Holgate and Nicholas Heath; but he was deprived of the office, as well as of his archdeaconry, in 1559 for refusing to take the oath of supremacy.

In 1559, the year of his deprivation, he obtained letters patent from Elizabeth I to found a grammar school at Tideswell on condition that he refrained from preaching or hindering the Queen's Majesty's laws concerning religion but the local vicar became a recusant priest. On 5 June 1563, he also obtained letters patent to found a similar school, bearing the same name, and also a hospital, or almshouse, at Guisborough in North Yorkshire. Despite his undertaking in respect of religion, the school he founded was soon sending recruits to Douai.

Pursglove resided in his last years partly at Tideswell and partly at Dunston in the same county. He died on 2 May 1579, and was buried in Tideswell church where a monumental brass in the floor shows him dressed as a bishop in alb, stole and chasuble (robes worn up to the reign of Mary I, but banned under the Elizabethan Church Settlement).

Prior Pursglove College, a sixth form college in Guisborough, North Yorkshire, is named in his memory. At some point or other, he used the alias "Sylvester".
