= Litton Mill =

Textile mill in Derbyshire, England

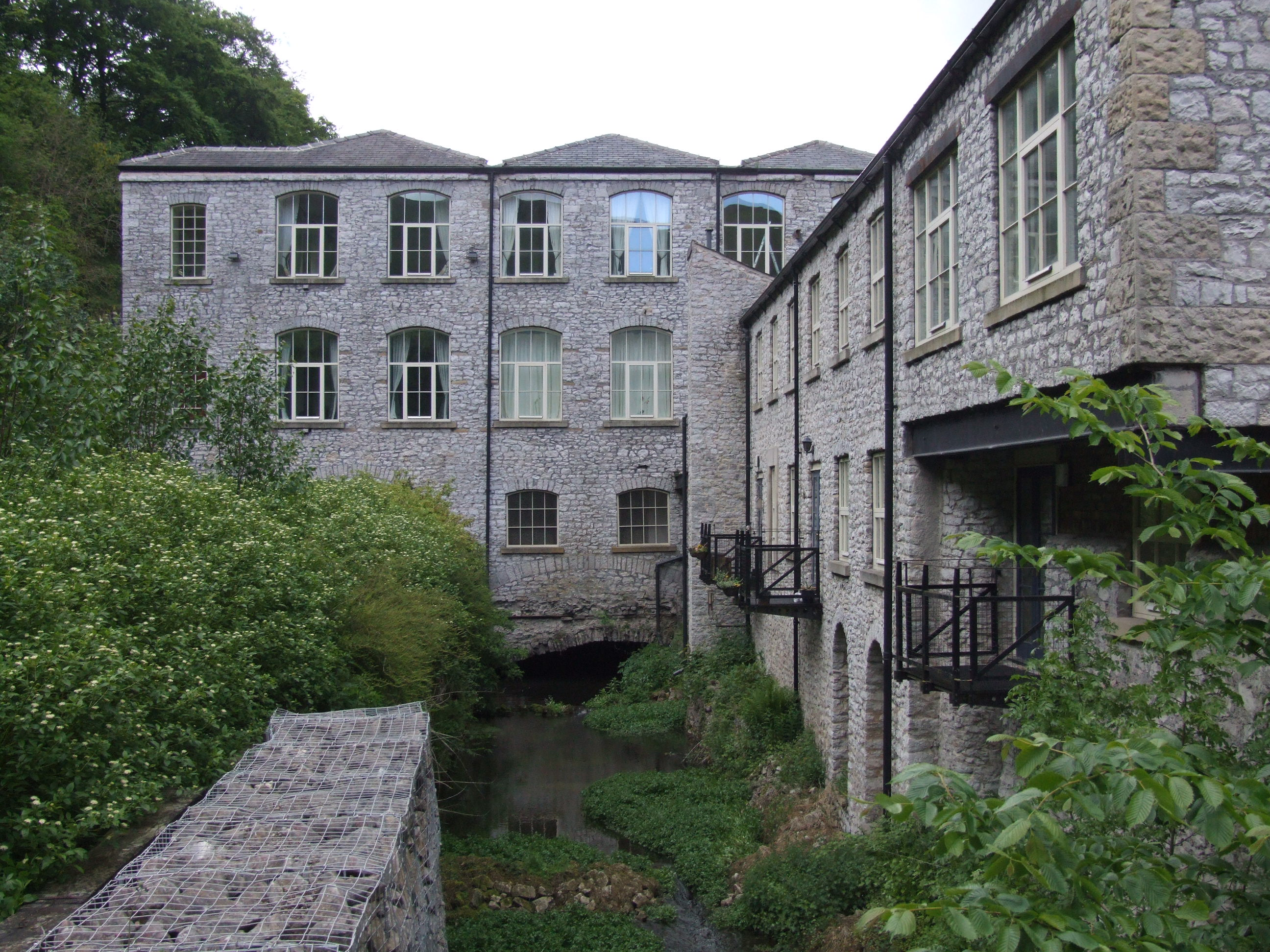

- Location within Derbyshire

Water spinning mill
- Client: Ellis Needham and Thomas Frith
- Further ownership: Newtons of Cressbrook Mill (); Mr Matthew Dickie (1893); Anglo-French Silk Mills (1934)
- Coordinates: 53.254°N 1.762°W

Construction
- Built: 1782; 244 years ago
- Destroyed: 1874; 152 years ago (New mill built)

Litton Mill is a textile mill at Millers Dale, near Tideswell in Derbyshire.

The original 19th-century mill became notorious during the Industrial Revolution for its unsavoury employment practices, luridly described by the commentators of the day, and the testimony of Robert Blincoe, a parish apprentice who had been indentured to work at the mill.

It was set up in 1782 by Ellis Needham and Thomas Frith, both farmers with small estates in the area. The mill was powered by the water of the River Wye, using Richard Arkwright's water frame. It could be said that the company was doomed from the start. Needham, in particular, had sunk most of his assets into the venture. The valley was particularly isolated and transport for the raw material and finished goods was poor. Moreover, they had difficulty in attracting a workforce.

The early spinners, such as Arkwright and Strutt, had been able to attract the families of weavers and framework knitters, so-called "free labour" meaning the employees were not indentured. Meanwhile, Evans at Darley Abbey could draw on a pool of labour from the town of Derby. In contrast, the area around Litton was sparsely populated by farming people who were scornful of the new cotton industry.

By 1786 the, barely profitable, mill was put up for sale. There were no buyers and Needham and Frith struggled on. Needham's money had gone and he was farming on rented land, while Frith left the partnership in 1799.

The Poor Relief Act 1601 had, among its provisions "the putting out of children to be apprentices". An agreement was made between the churchwarden and an employer, by means of an indenture sworn before a Justice of the Peace, that the latter would provide for and give employment and training to a pauper child. This was intended for the benefit of the child but often it was seen by employers as a source of cheap labour and a way for a parish to relieve itself of responsibility. In the absence of any local labour, this was the course taken by Needham and Frith.

In the early 19th century there was a general depression in the industry, and the workforce was reduced by a half. There was a serious fire, and in 1811 the waterwheel broke and was out of action for a month. By 1815, Needham was bankrupt and had been given notice to quit. By 1828 he was a pauper. Frith fared somewhat better on his farm, and operating a small spinning mill near Tideswell.

The mill was operated for a time by the Newtons of Cressbrook Mill but was destroyed by another fire in 1874. Very little remains of the original mill. Its replacement manufactures nylon yarn for hosiery.

In 1893 Mr Matthew Dickie, a former Stockport mill owner, bought Litton Mill. Dickie began his business career as a spinner and manufacturer with his father Matthew Dickie Senior. When he took over Litton Mill he brought with him several families from Stockport. He set up a Litton & Cressbrook Mills Company and Cressbrook Mill was taken over. To bring the two mills into closer touch, a road was made along the river by the Company and a toll in aid of local hospitals was charged for visitors who wished to use the road. This shortened the distance to Monsal Dale. Litton Mill was sold to a syndicate in 1934.

Matthew Dickie had Ravenstor built in Miller's Dale as his family residence which was given to the National Trust in 1937 by Alderman J.G.Graves of Sheffield along with 64 acres (260,000 m^{2}) of land, which included a one-mile (1.6 km) stretch of the River Wye and Tideswell Dale, all of which are leased to the Youth Hostel Association and open all year round.
