= Samuel Slack =

Samuel Slack (1757–1822), sometimes known as The Tideswell Vocalist, was a bass singer, a native of Derbyshire and protégé of Georgiana Cavendish, Duchess of Devonshire.

Slack was a natural bass, and though of unpolished manners (in one account "an uncouth example of common manhood") he was able, thanks to the Duchess's patronage, to study under Reginald Spofforth. At the height of his career he was the most popular bass singer in England, and he is said to have performed before King George III.

His tomb in Tideswell churchyard, initially erected by public subscription, was restored in 1891.

== Sources ==
- "Notes of the Month", The Antiquary, vol. 24 (1891), p. 237.
- M. J. B. Baddeley, The Peak District of Derbyshire and the Neighbourhood(7th ed., 1899), p. 116.
