= Advent Hunstone =

English woodcarver

Advent Hunstone (bapt. 28 November 1858 – 15 July 1927; known as "Old" Advent) was an English woodcarver from Tideswell, Derbyshire.

Hunstone, the son of a gardener, was working as a stonemason when he was first encouraged to take up woodworking by Rev. Canon Samuel Andrew, Vicar of Tideswell. He showed remarkable ability in woodworking and applied his new skill in the restoration of St John the Baptist, Tideswell.

His work includes a combination of natural, representational and symbolical material. Other nearby churches in Derbyshire where Advent Hunstone's work may be found include the lych gate at Burbage, the reredos and high altar at Dronfield, the organ cases and choirstalls at Matlock St Giles, various furnishings at Millers Dale, and at Wormhill the chancel furnishings.

He was an active member of the Tideswell community and served on the rural district council for 15 years and on the parish council for 37 years.

== Key Sources ==
- Martin Hulbert, The Woodcarvings at Tideswell
