= St John the Baptist, Tideswell =

Church in Derbyshire, England

St John the Baptist's Church, Tideswell
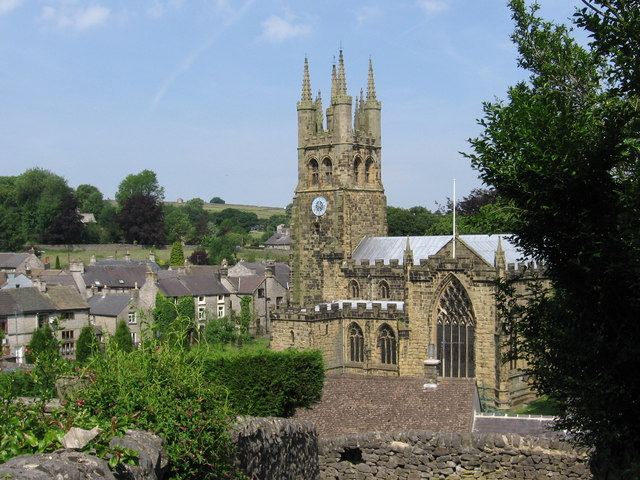
- St John the Baptist's Church, Tideswell
- St John the Baptist's Church, Tideswell
- 53.2788°N 1.7726°W
- OS grid reference: SK 15256 75774
- Country: England
- Denomination: Church of England
- Churchmanship: Broad Church

History
- Dedication: St John the Baptist

Architecture
- Heritage designation: Grade I listed building
- Architectural type: Decorated Gothic

Administration
- Province: Canterbury
- Diocese: Diocese of Derby
- Archdeaconry: Chesterfield
- Deanery: Bakewell and Eyam
- Parish: Tideswell

The church of St John the Baptist in Tideswell in Derbyshire is a Church of England parish church.

== Background ==
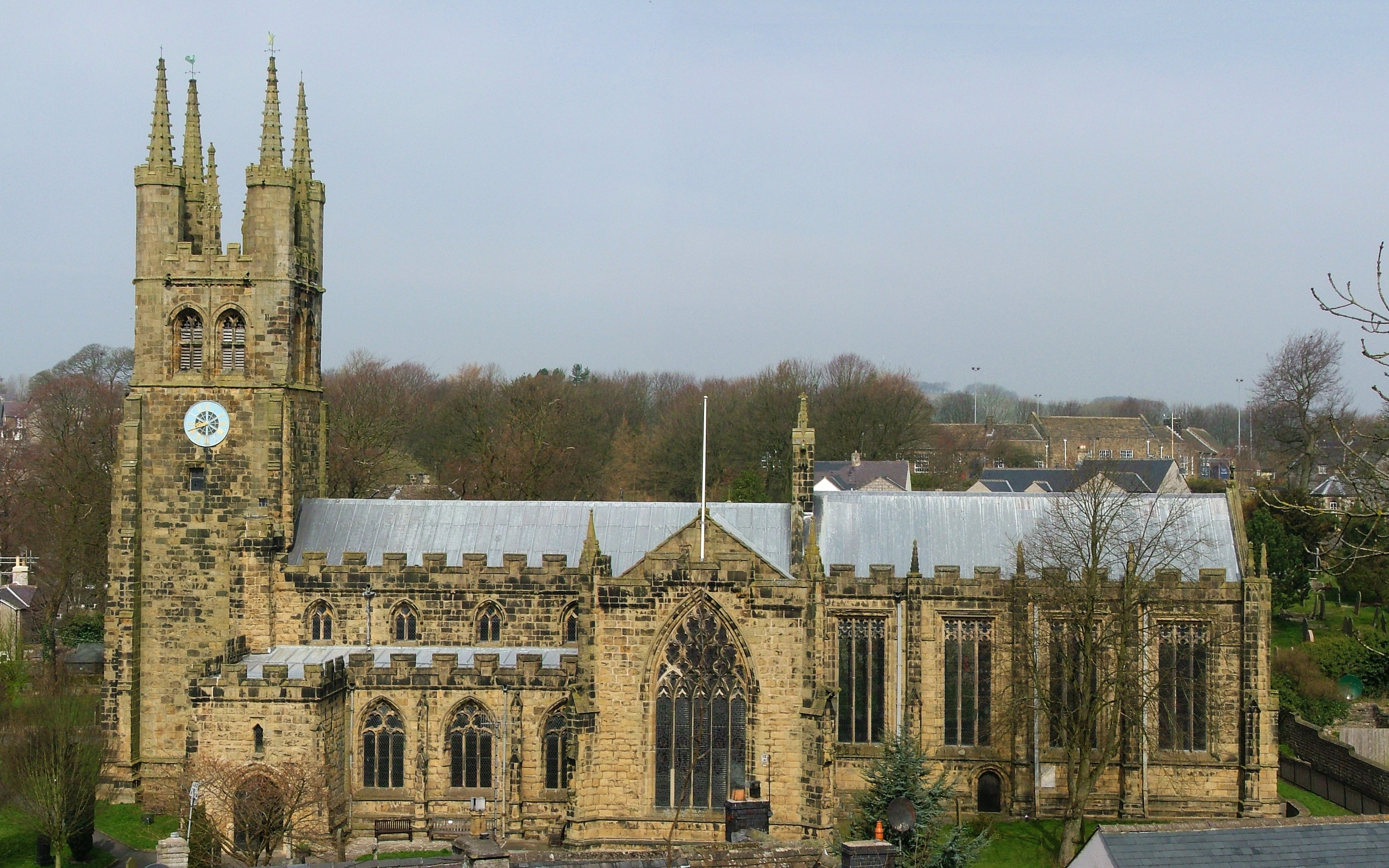
Tideswell church, one of the most important parish churches in Derbyshire

Although it is not actually a cathedral, due to its size and splendour, the church is widely known as the "Cathedral of the Peak". It is one of the most famous churches in Derbyshire, and a Grade I listed building.

== History ==
In 1250–51, the church became embroiled in a dispute between Lichfield Cathedral and Lenton Priory in Nottinghamshire. Tideswell was one of a number of parishes that had been granted to Lenton Priory by the Peverel family during the 11th century. Following William Peverel the Younger's accusations of treason, the family's lands in the Peak District were seized by the crown and granted by King Henry II to his son, John (later John, King of England). After acceding to the throne, John granted the lands to the Bishop of Lichfield and in turn they passed to the Dean and Chapter of Lichfield Cathedral. This transfer started approximately 300 years of disagreement between the priory and cathedral about who was rightful owner of the property. Litigation continued throughout this period, including suits in the Vatican Court on several occasions.

Tideswell church became directly involved in the disagreement when it became violent in 1250–51. The monks of Lenton Priory armed themselves and attempted to steal wool and lambs from Tideswell, which was one of the disputed parishes controlled by Lichfield. Pre-empting the monk's attack, the Dean of Lichfield cathedral ordered the wool and sheep to be kept within the nave of Tideswell church. However the monks of Lenton did not honour the church's sanctuary rights and broke into the building. A fight ensued and 18 lambs were killed within the church: either trampled under the horses' hooves or butchered by the attackers' weapons. The monks managed to carry off 14 of the lambs.

A commission assembled by Pope Innocent IV harshly fined the monks of Lenton Priory. However the disputes continued until Lenton was dissolved by King Henry VIII.

The church, which replaced a small Norman church, was constructed between approximately 1320 and 1400. The building work was delayed by the Black Death. There are two main styles: the nave, aisles and transepts are in late gothic style, and both the chancel and tower are in perpendicular style.

There was major restoration started in 1873 by John Dando Sedding which was a genuine restoration rather than a reconstruction. The restoration work involved the replacement of the oak roof and re-leading. However, the restoration undertaken by the architect was viewed favourably by those who preferred the preservation of fabric rather than its replacement. The Manchester Courier and Lancashire General Advertiser wrote on 25 August 1874:

It is a relief to find so fine and pure a specimen of fourteenth century architecture in trustworthy hands. We have not to complain here as in so many instances of so-called restoration of that passion for the destruction of old work which, on the plea of restoration, has removed some of the most characteristic features of our ancient Gothic buildings. No single piece of old work not obviously unfit from decay to remain has been allowed to disappear. The mistakes of careless times have with great discrimination been remedied; the old landmarks, where recoverable, have been restored, and great judgement has evidently been exercised in the new work introduced

The chapel in the south transept was restored as a gift of James Bower Brown of Woodthorpe Hall, Sheffield, under the supervision of Innocent and Brown, architects of Sheffield. The tomb of Sir Thurstan de Bower and Lady Margaret was reconstructed by the sculptor Thomas Earp of London.

The chancel was reopened on 30 September 1875. The carving of the figures in stone and wood was executed by Mr. Green of Manchester, and the oak carving of the chancel stalls was done by Mr. Tooley of Bury St. Edmunds. The contractor for the stonework was Messrs. Hill of Tideswell.

Restoration work continued until 1905, when the gallery of 1826 was removed from under the tower. John Oldrid Scott provided new south doors which contained panels cut from an oak beam taken from the Old Guild Hall in the village centre. The six upper panels were filled with traceried carving.

In Churches and Chapels in The County of Derby, Rawlins described St John's as being:

without exception the most perfect and beautiful specimen of pointed architecture to be found in the County, - or perhaps in any other parish church of its size in the entire Kingdom.

== Parish status ==
The church is in a joint parish with

- St John the Evangelist's Church, Cressbrook
- Christ Church, Litton
- St Anne's Church, Millers Dale
- St Margaret's Church, Wormhill

== Vicars of Tideswell ==
- Henry 1193
- Robert
- John Strage 124?
- Magister Ralph 1275
- Henry de Lucebi 1275
- Roger 1281
- Laurence Schryvenham
- William Andrew 1336
- Thomas 1339
- Robert 1340
- John 1359
- Hugh Fordyan 1359
- John Bakster 1364
- William 1381
- John Aleyne (or Yoxhale) 1406
- William Holmesfield 1413
- William Pursgloves 1441
- Thomas Taillour 1473
- William Kirke 1482
- Edmund Eyre 1501
- Arthur Meverell 1544 (last Prior of Tutbury)
- George Cocke 1547
- Robert Hullens 1549
- William Fieldsend 1551
- William Pendleton 1576
- William Greaves 1592
- Christopher Fulnetby 1634
- Nicholas Cross 1634
- Ralph Heathcote 1636
- Anthony Buxton 1656
- John Beebee 1656
- Isaac Sympson 1662
- Laurence Brierly 1663
- Richard Jepson 1680
- Joseph Cresswicke 1681
- Richard Unitt 1691
- Daniel Totty 1691
- John Allen 1695
- Adamson Kenyon 1719
- Edward Markland 1730
- William Stephenson 1776
- Richard Shuttleworth 1778
- Thomas Brown 1796
- John Kynaston 1837
- William Moxon Mann 1855
- William Humphrey Vale 1858
- Samuel Andrew 1864
- James Michael John Fletcher 1900
- Thomas Rogerson 1906
- Herbert Alfred Tamplin 1919
- Edgar Gwillym Walmsley 1922
- Richard Fletcher Edwards 1929
- Vere Townshend Ducker 1942
- David Edmund Rice 1962
- John Bryce Warburton 1970
- John David Slyfield 1982
- Martin F.H. Hulbert 1993
- Francis Yates 2003

== Memorials ==
There are brasses to Sir John Foljamb, d. 1383 (restored) and to Bishop Robert Purseglove, d. 1579, who is depicted in pre-English Reformation vestments.

In the middle of the chancel there is an altar tomb. Within lies Sir Samson Meverill (1388–1462), who fought at the Siege of Orléans against Joan of Arc. The tomb has a marble slab beneath which is a stone cadaver decorated with an alabaster frieze. The tomb was restored in 1876.

In the South transept there are two chapels. The Lytton chapel has one of the old bells on the floor, while nearby is the tomb of Robert (d. 1483) and his wife Isabel (d. 1458) Lytton. The Bower chapel contains a rather impressive tomb of (possibly) Sir Thurstan and his wife Margret de Bower. The inscription mentions de Bower, but there is some debate about the accuracy. The recumbent alabaster figures are well worn. The old high altar is against the east wall.

The churchyard contains war graves of seven service personnel of World War I.

== Gallery ==
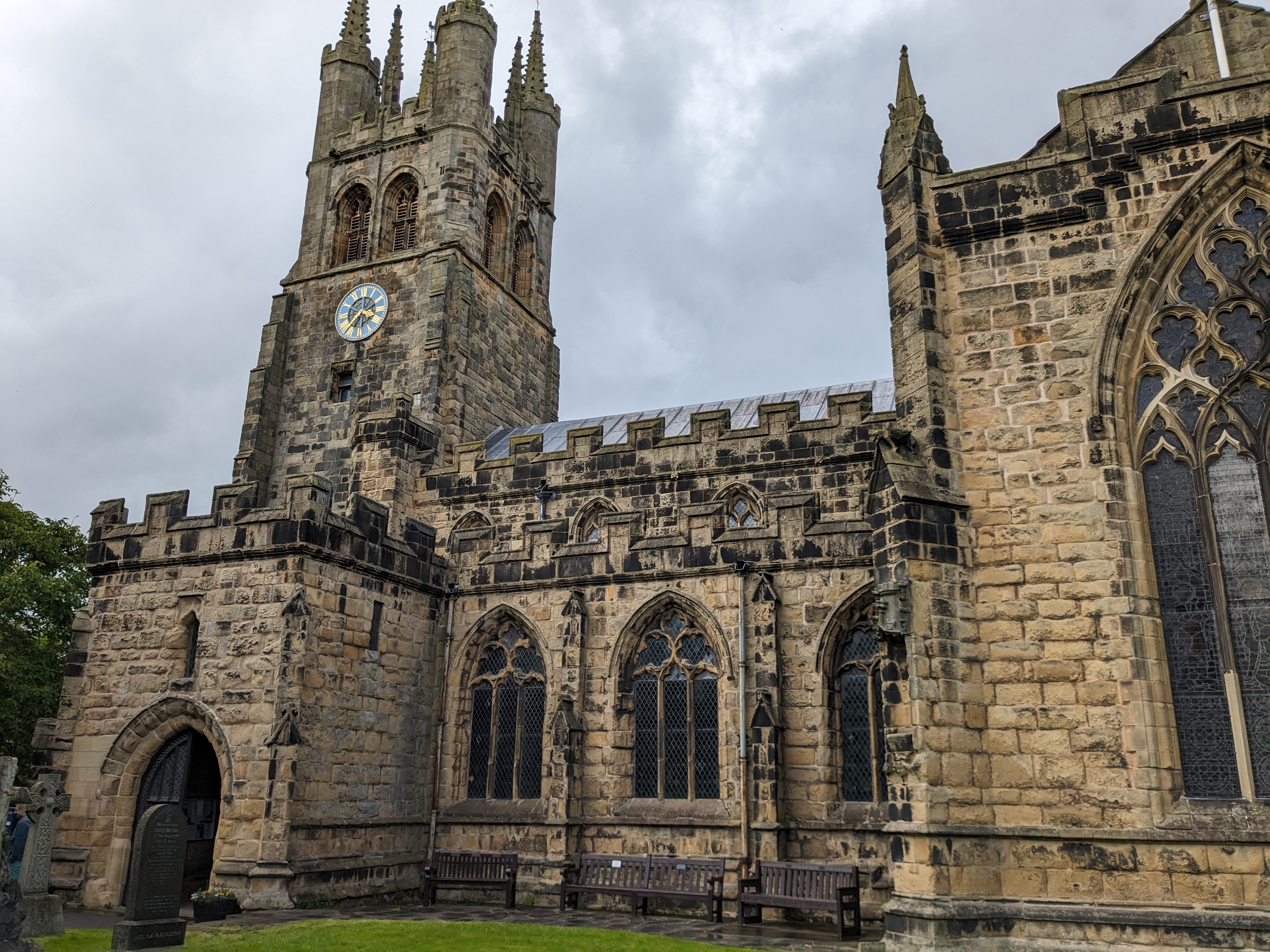
Exterior

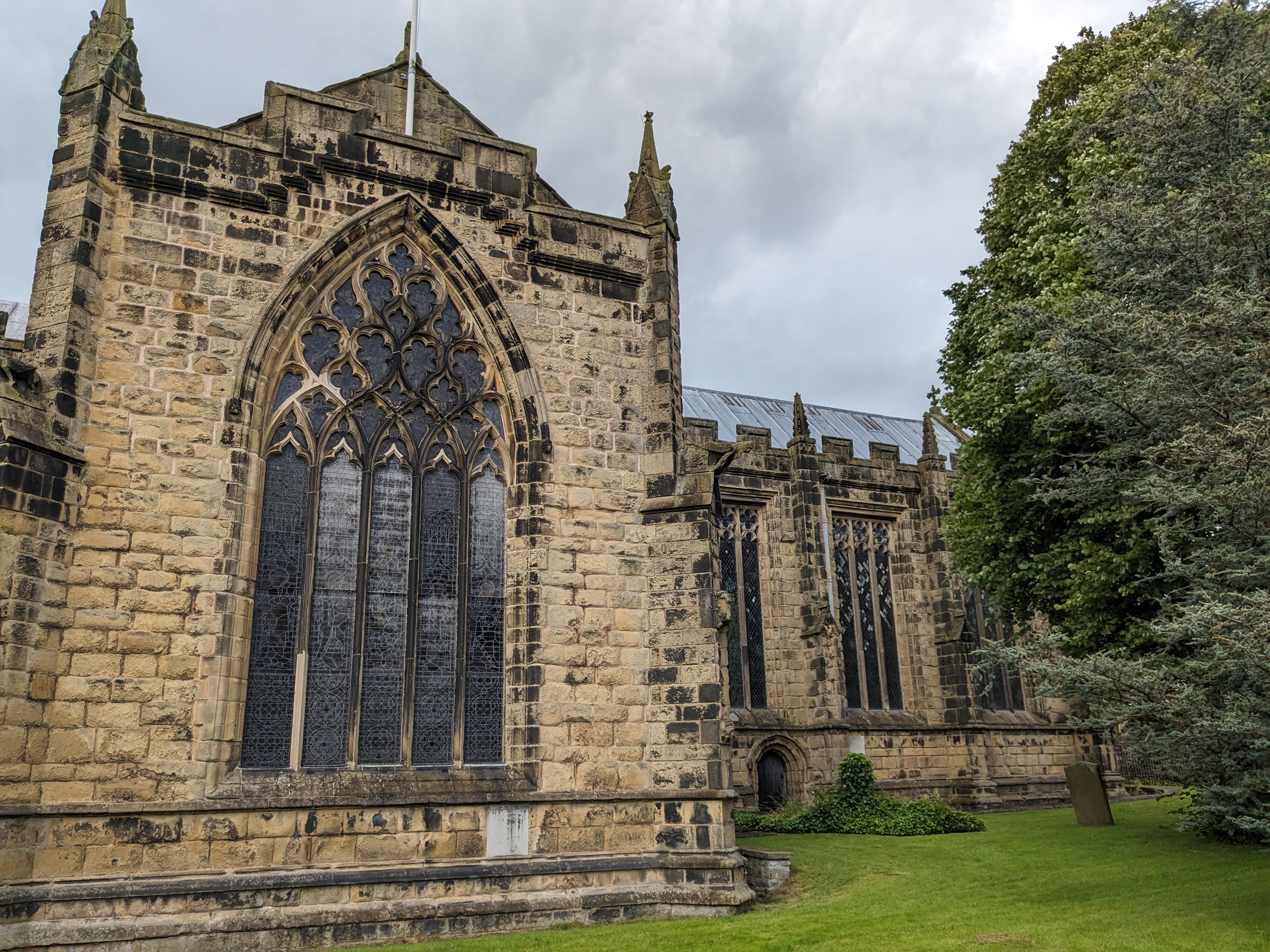
Exterior (south transept and chancel)

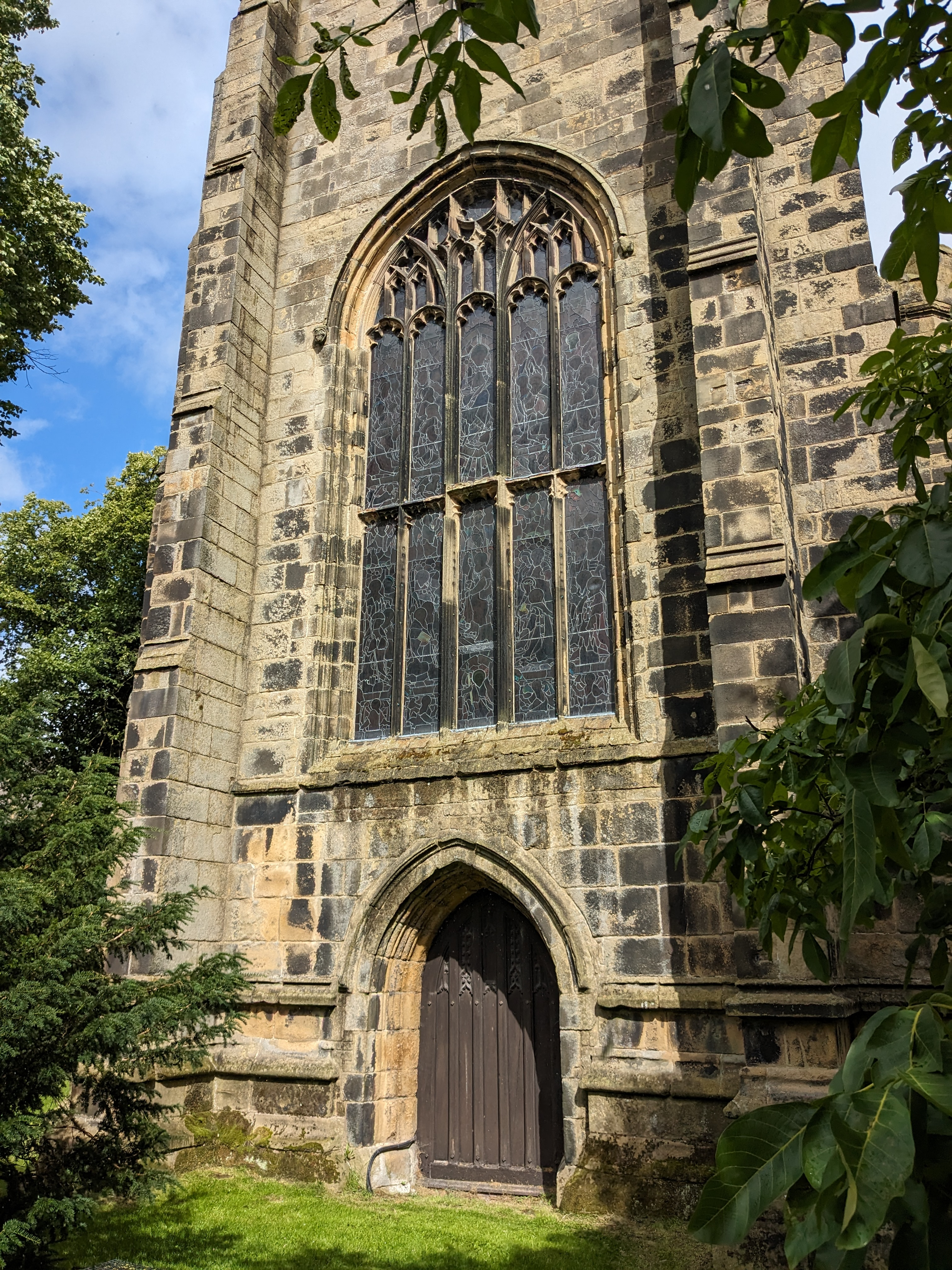
Tower window and door

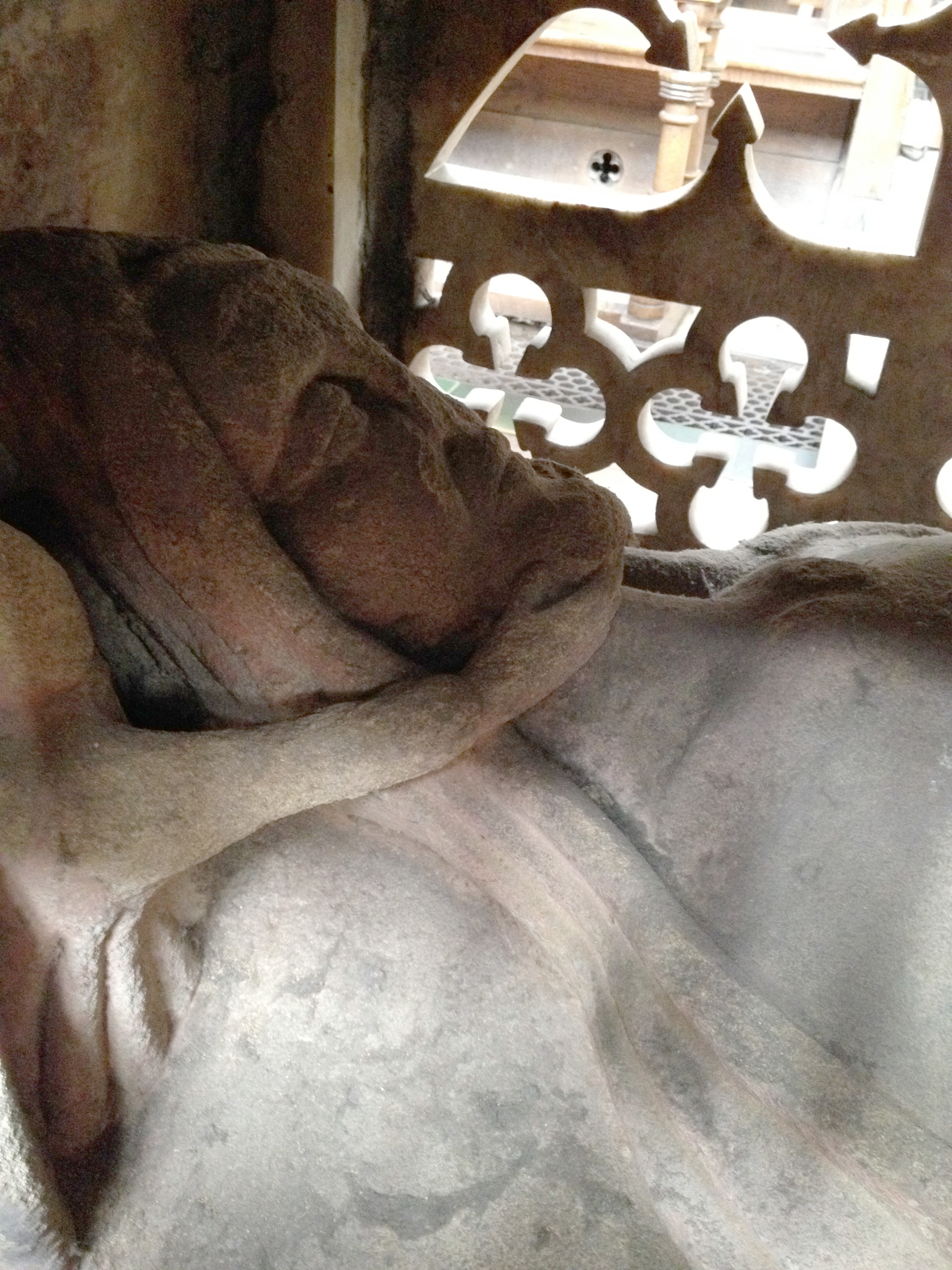
Tomb of Sir Sampson Meveril

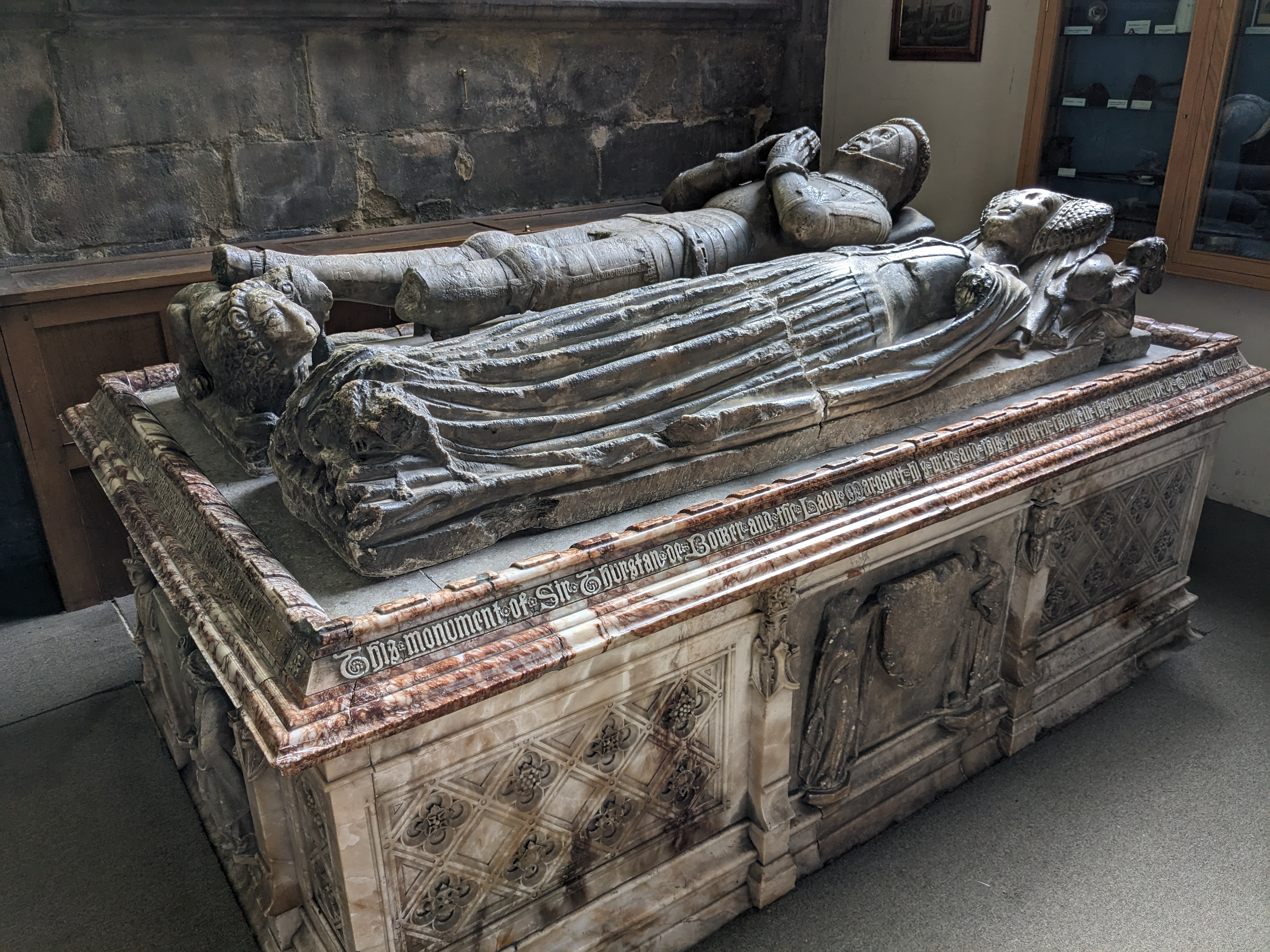
Tomb of Sir Thurstan de Bower and his wife Margaret

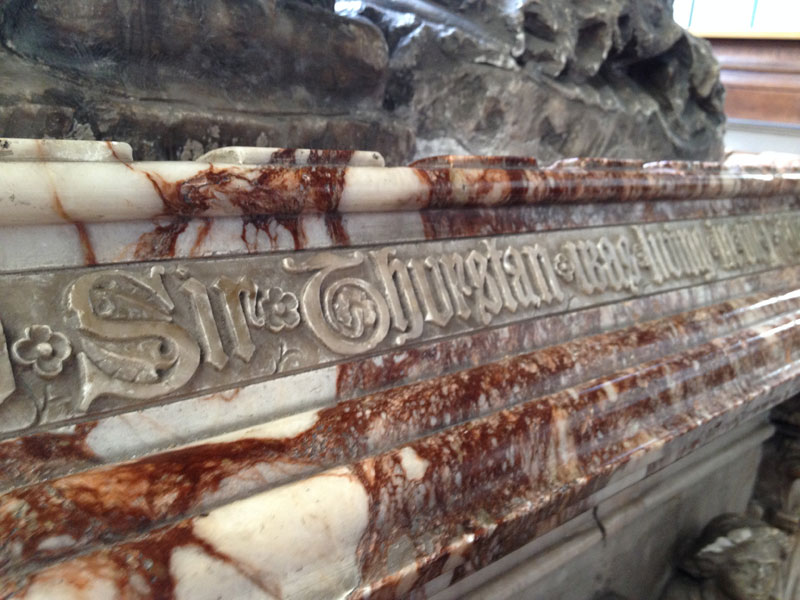
Inscription around the de Bower tomb

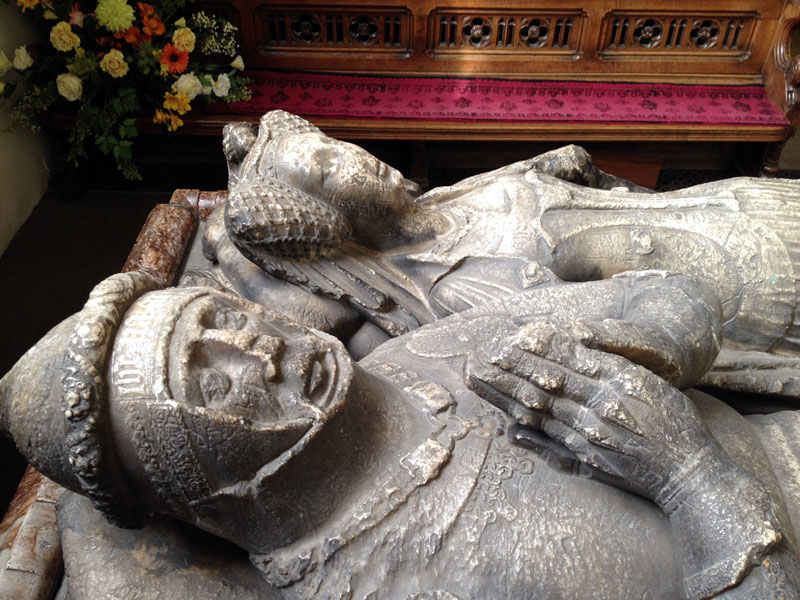
Close-up of de Bower effigies

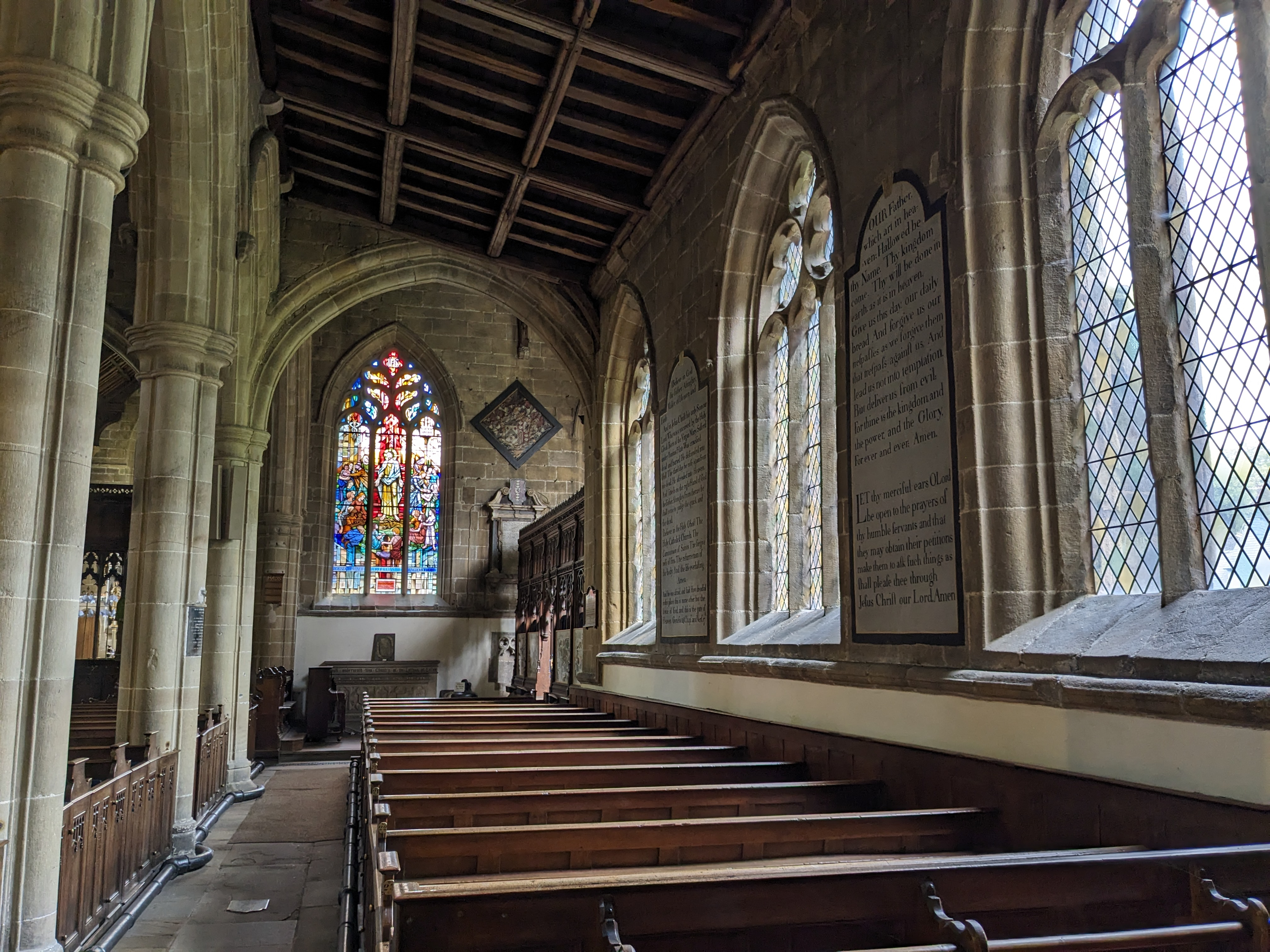
South aisle

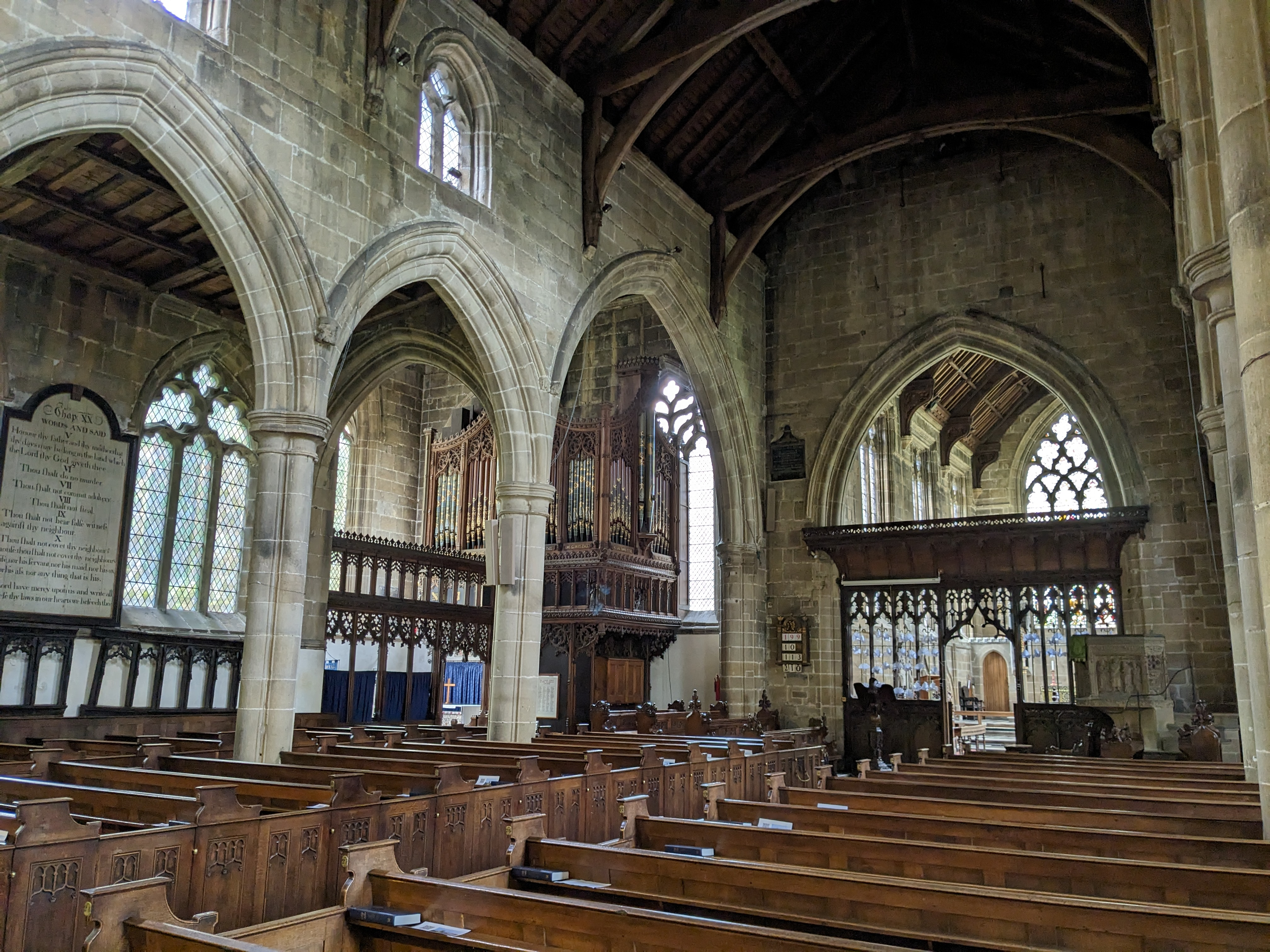
Nave, arcade, chancel arch and screen

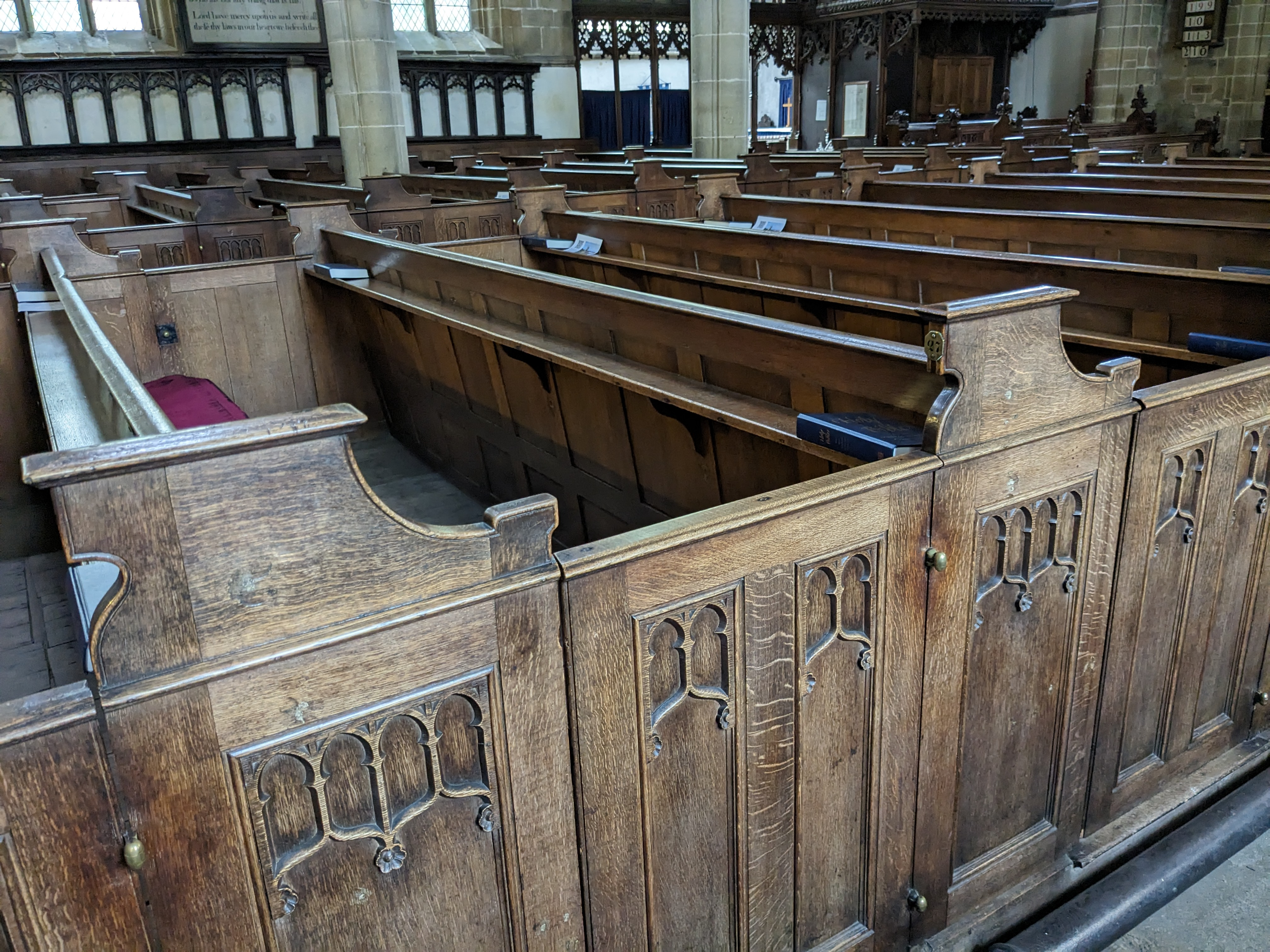
Close up of pew ends

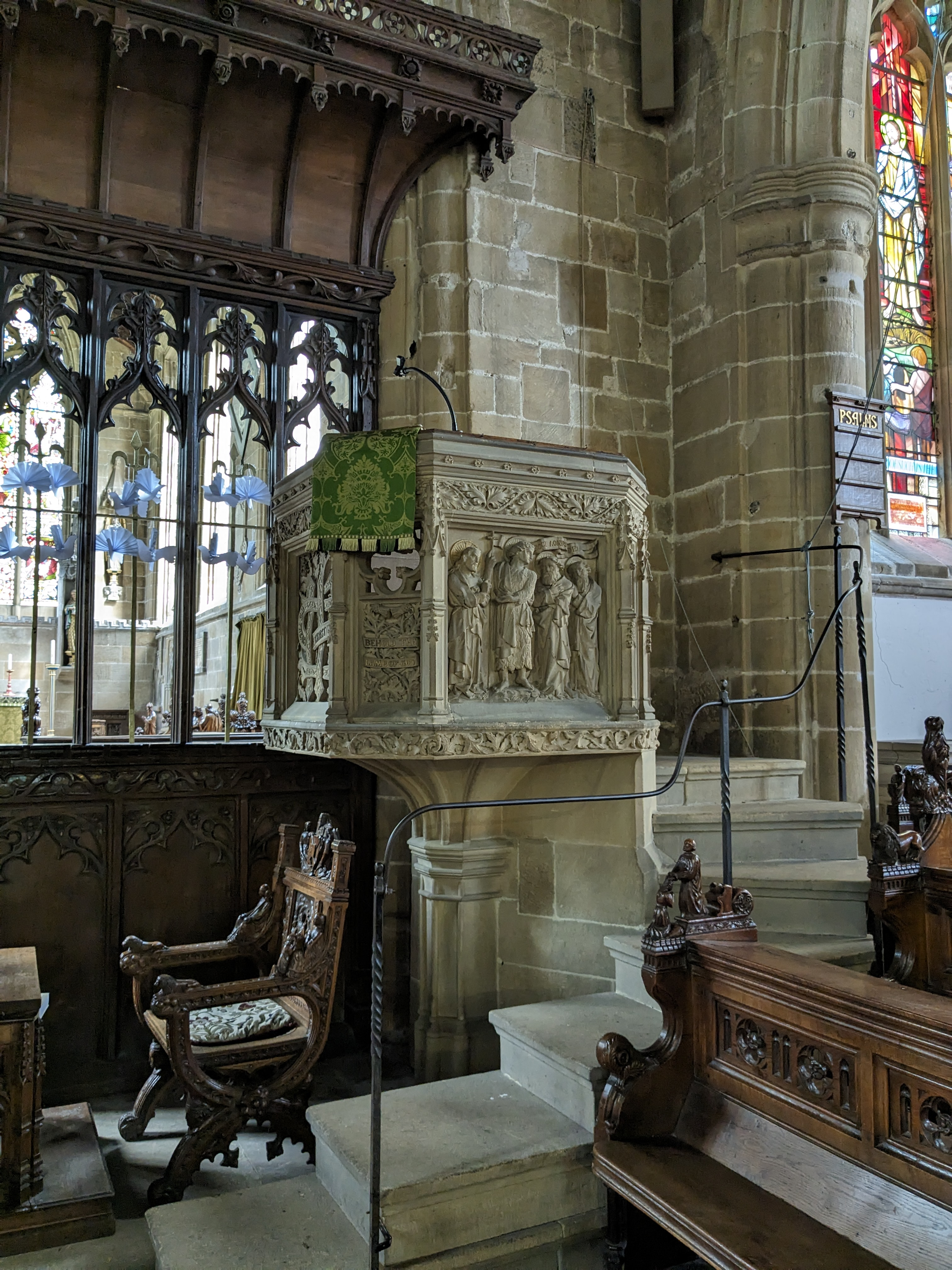
Pulpit

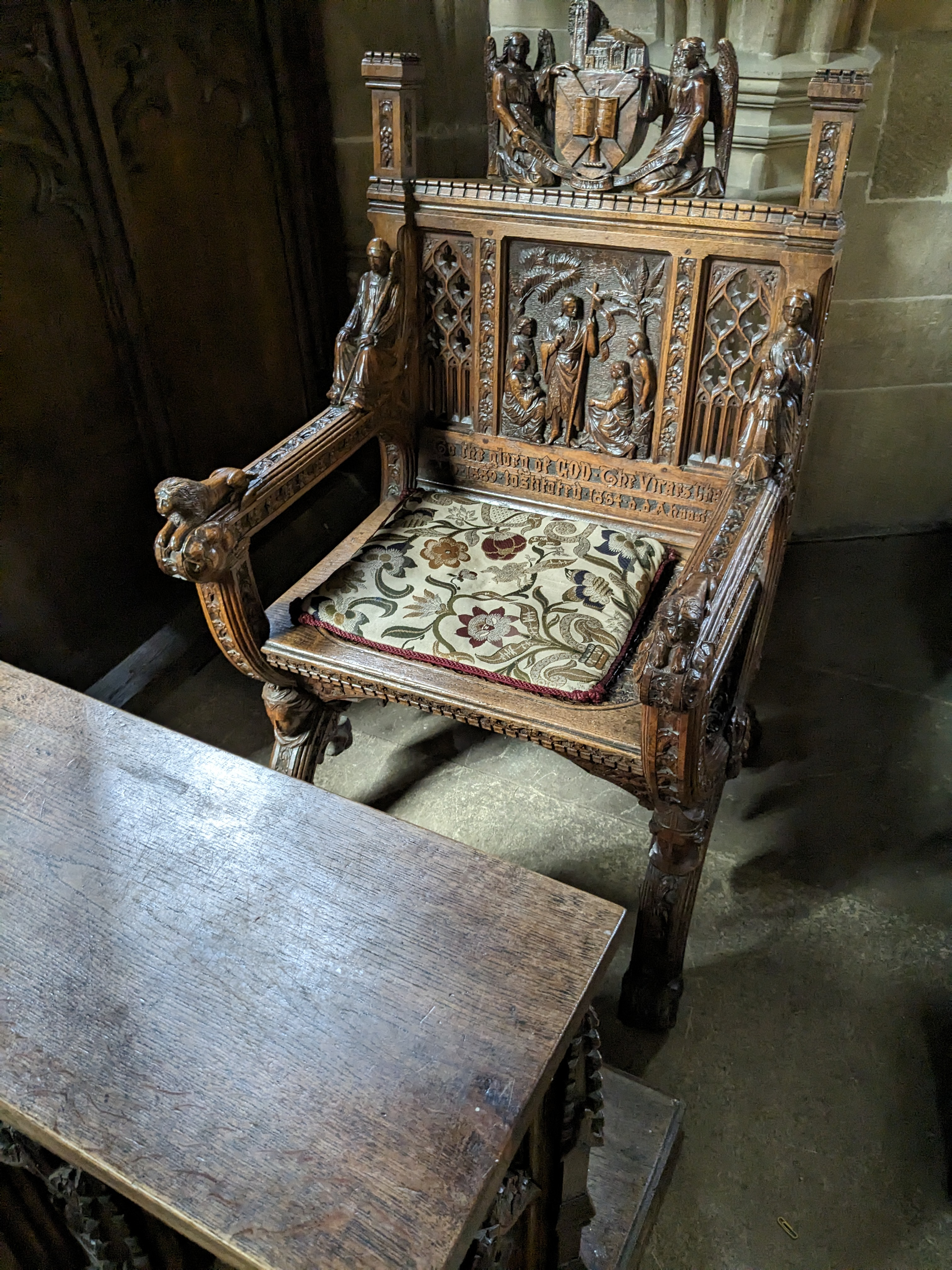
Ornate chair

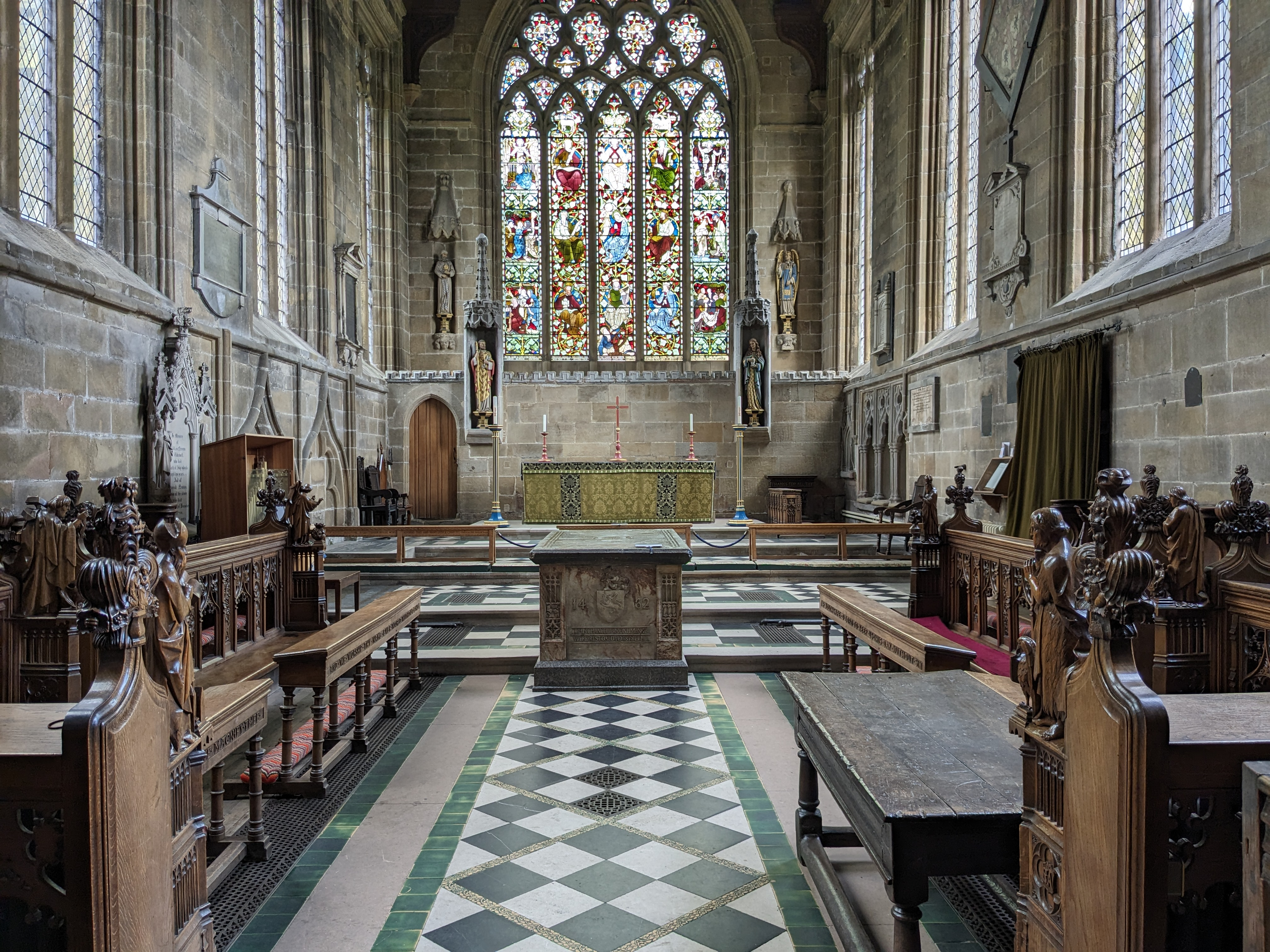
Altar and chancel

== Features ==
The font is medieval and has carvings of a chalice and an open book. The old north door, displayed at the back of the church, dates from about 1500 and was replaced in 1997. The ends of the pews have intricate carvings by the local, curiously named, Advent Hunstone. These show the sacraments; baptism, confirmation, communion, marriage, absolution, ordination and the last rites. The tower screen is by John Oldrid Scott and dates from 1904.

== Stained glass ==
The Tree of Jesse east window is by Heaton, Butler and Bayne of Nottingham and dates from 1875. The west window is a Te Deum by Hardman and Powell dating from 1907. In the centre is John the Baptist; it is a memorial to Elizabeth Sarah Fletcher and Mary Chandler who were mothers of the vicar, Rev. J.M.J. Fletcher, and his wife. A new window was inserted in 1996 as a memorial to William Newton (1750–1830), the Minstrel of the Peak. This window is by Alfred Fisher of Chapel Studio.

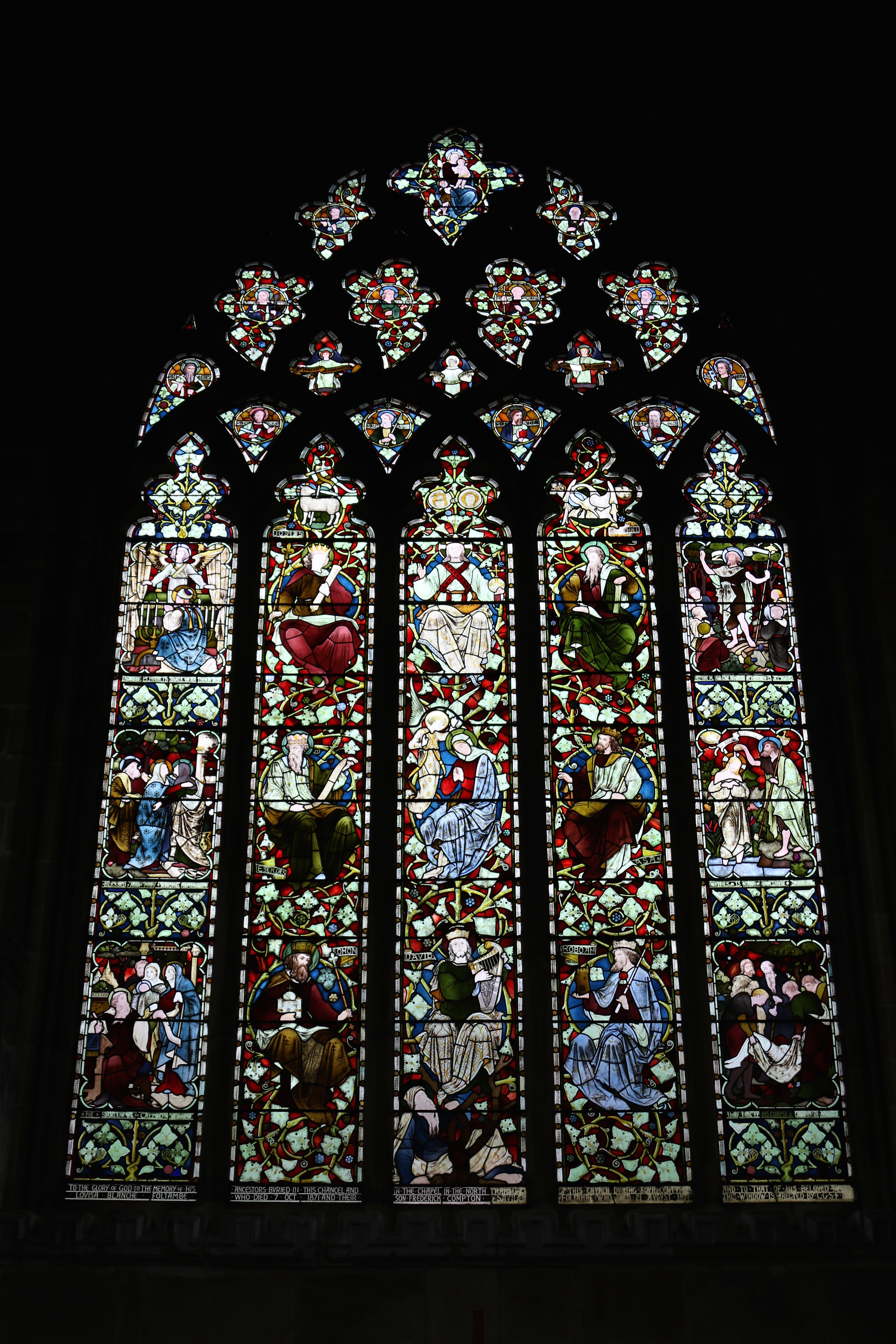
East window, Tree of Jesse, Heaton, Butler and Bayne 1876

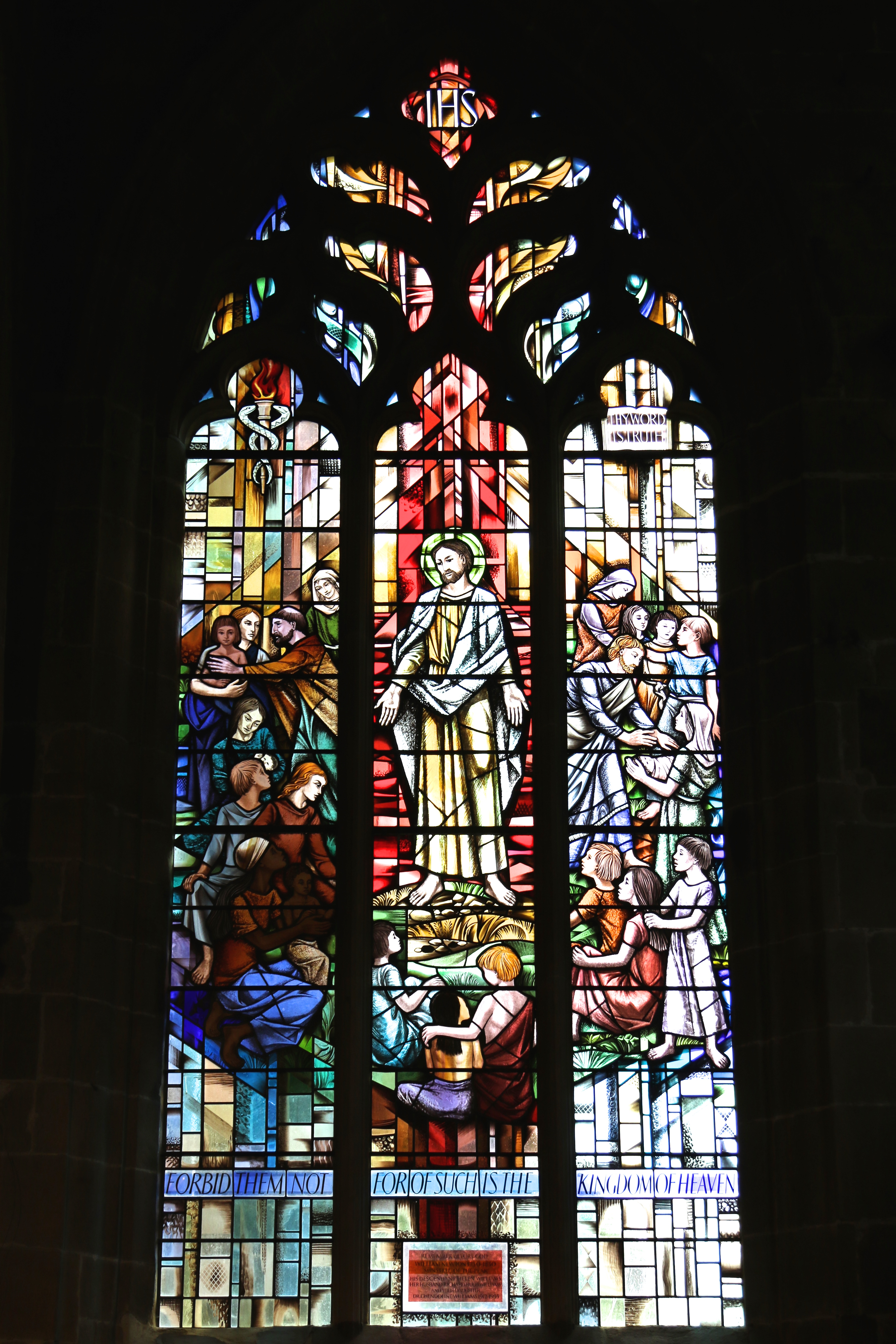
Memorial to William Newton by Alfred Fisher of Chapel Studio 1996

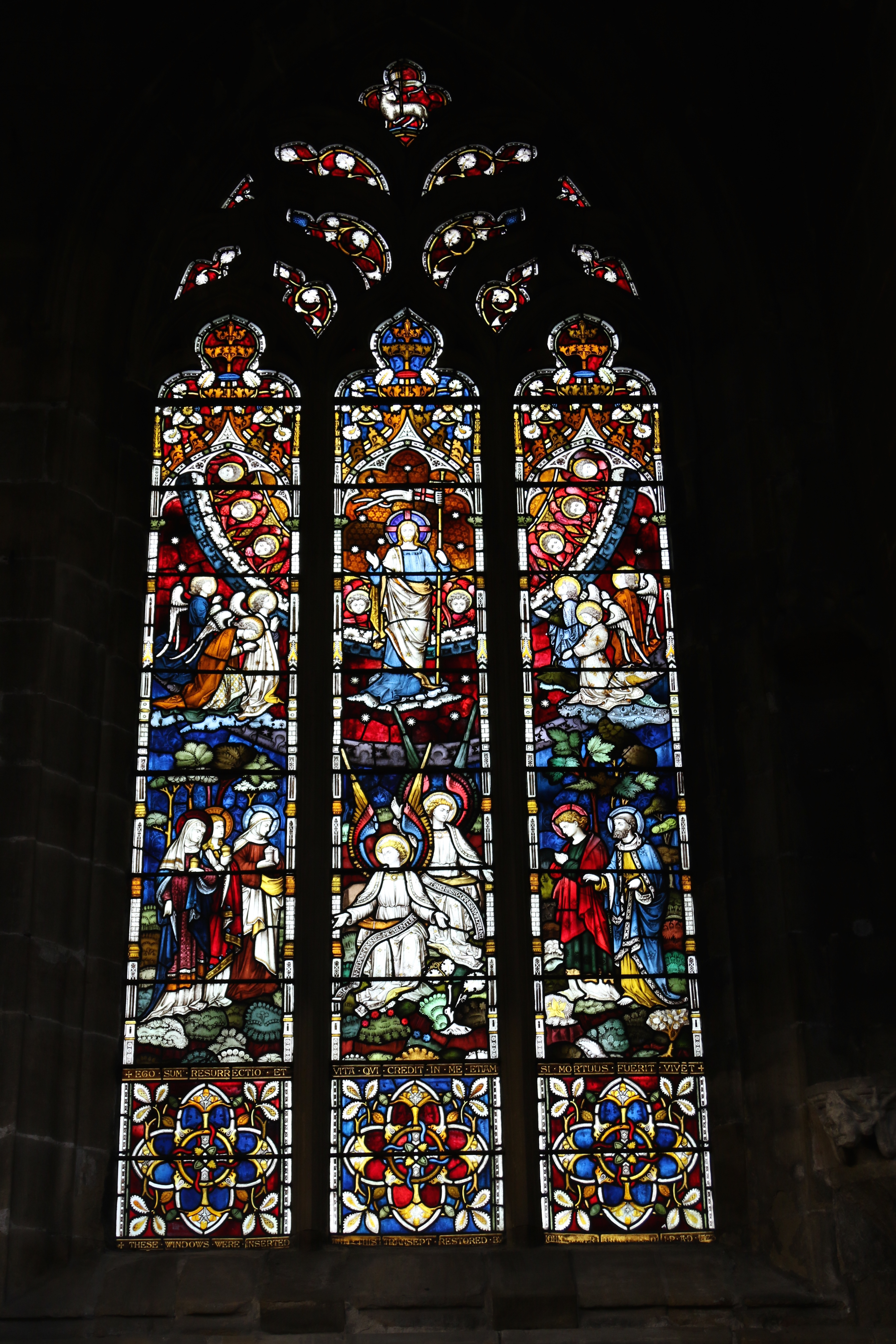
South Transept, The Resurrection

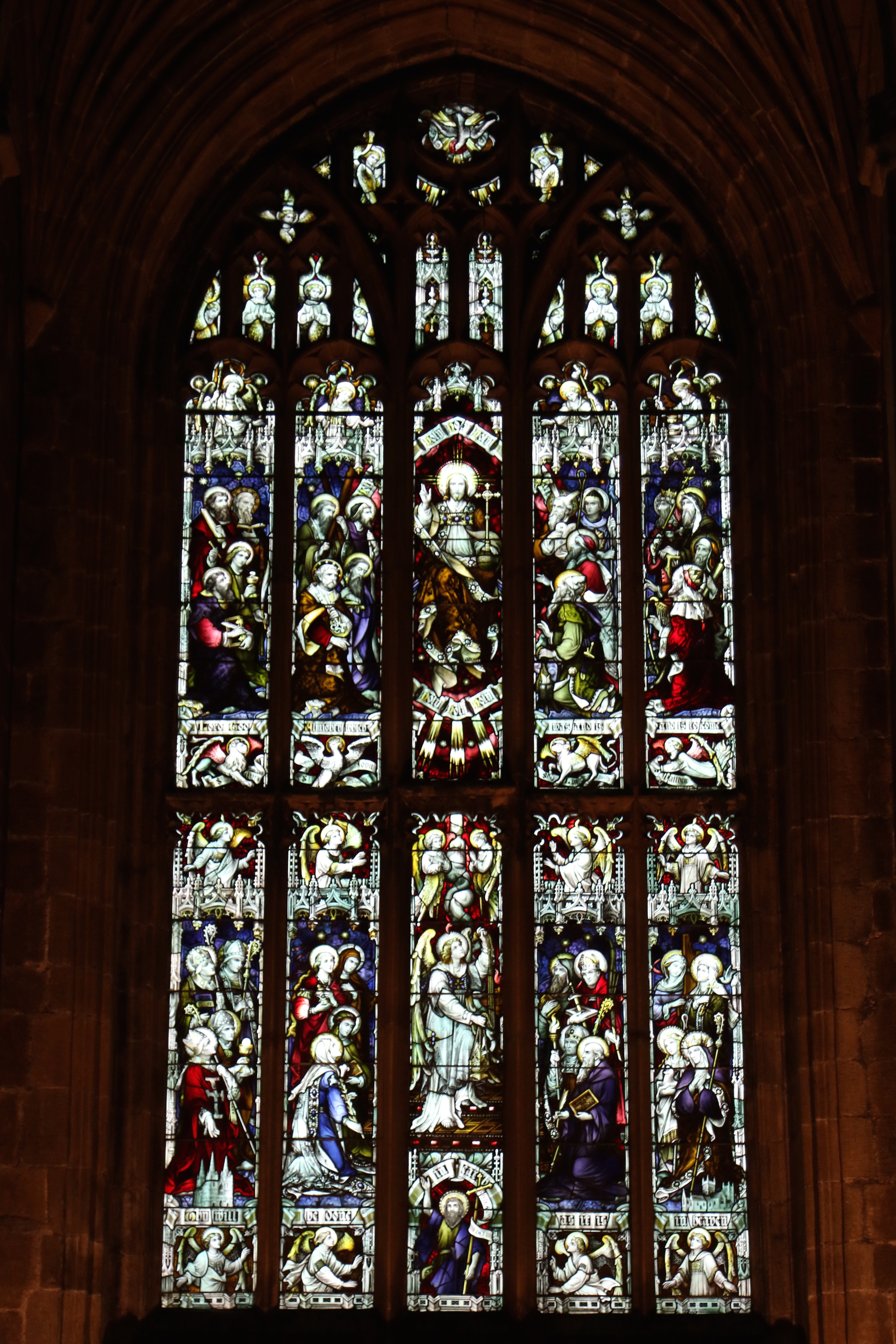
West window, Te Deum, Hardman and Powell, 1907

== Organs ==
The church possesses two pipe organs. The main organ dates from 1895 and is by the builder Forster and Andrews of Hull. A specification of the main organ can be found on the National Pipe Organ Register. The chancel organ dates from 1979. It is an extension organ by the Johnson Organ Company. A specification of the chancel organ can also be found on the National Pipe Organ Register.

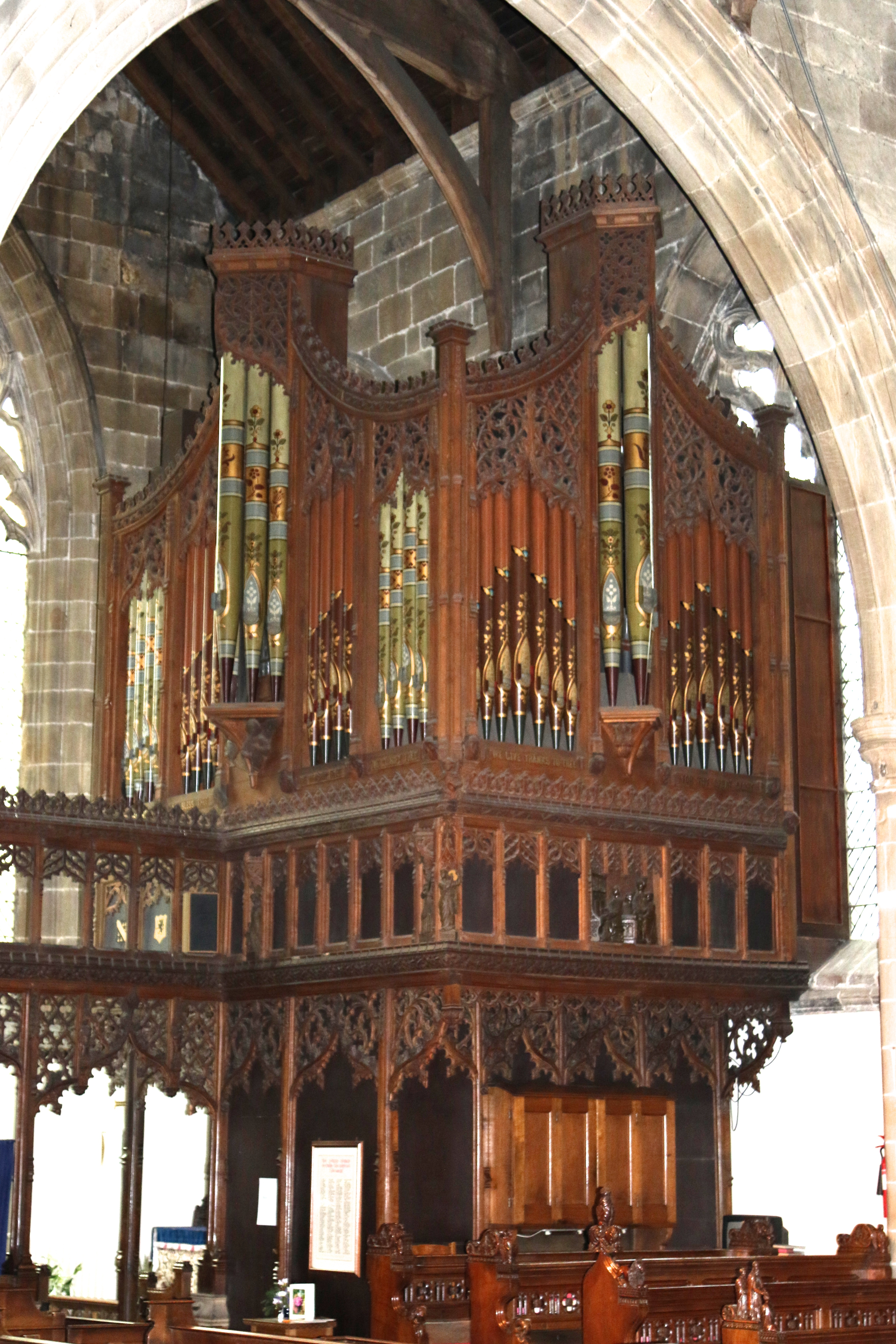
The main organ in the north transept

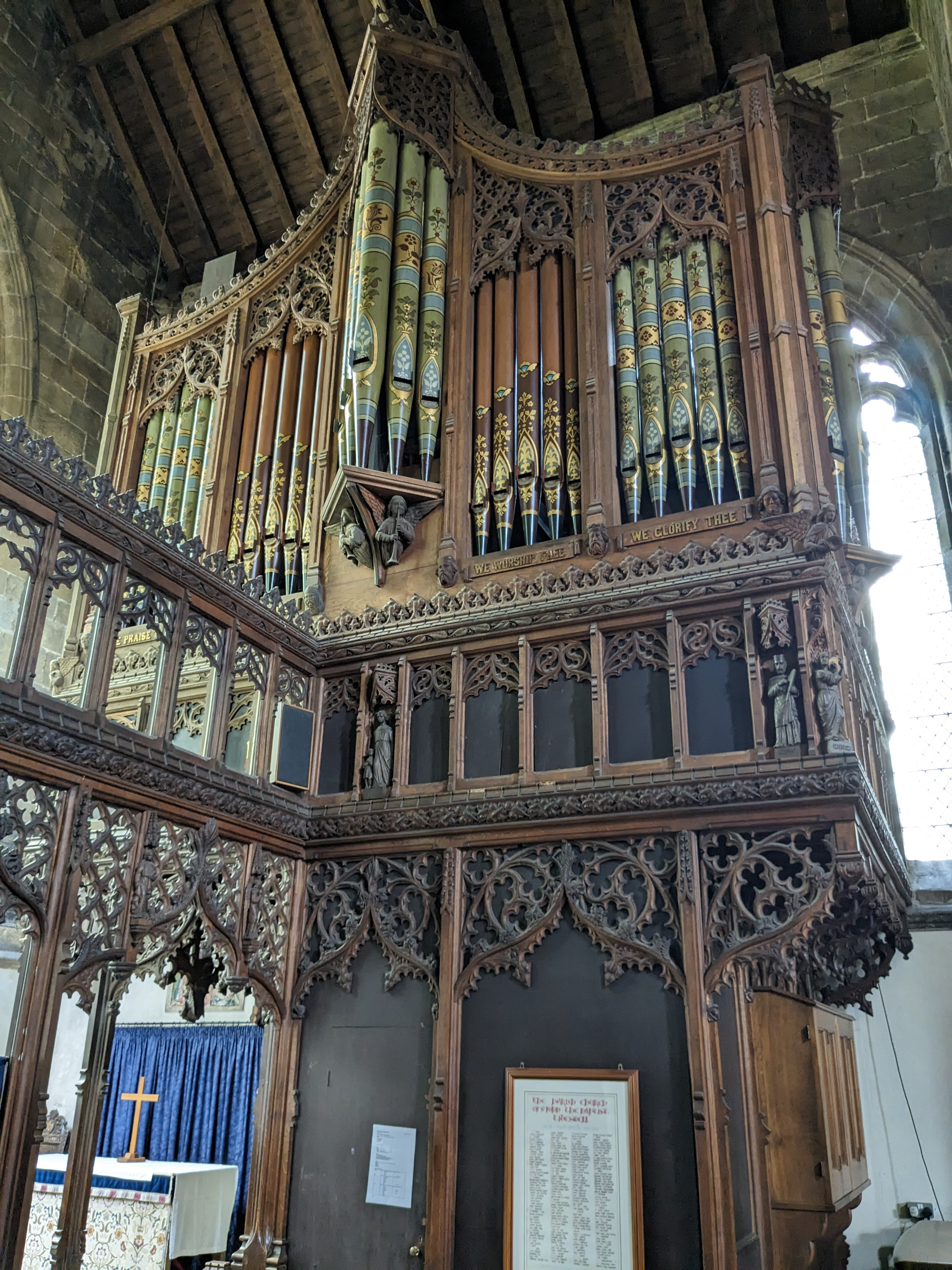
Pipe organ

== See also ==
- Grade I listed churches in Derbyshire
