= John Ashe (minister) =

English dissenting minister

John Ashe (1671–1735) was an English dissenting minister.

Ashe was the son of a grocer at Tideswell, Derbyshire. After being taught at Chesterfield by Mr. Foxlow, and at Wirksworth by Mr. Ogden, he was sent in 1688 to Rathmell Academy. He was chaplain for a time to Lady Sarah Houghton of Hoghton Tower, Lancashire, but returned to the Peak and was a minister at Ashford.

He published an account of the life of his uncle, the Rev. William Bagshaw, ‘the Apostle of the Peak’ (1704); a few sermons; and prepared for the press eleven volumes of sermons, of which only one appeared. A life of Ashe was published by John Clegg, presbyterian minister of Chapel-en-le-Frith, in 1736.
