= Tideswell Dale =

Valley in the Derbyshire Peak District

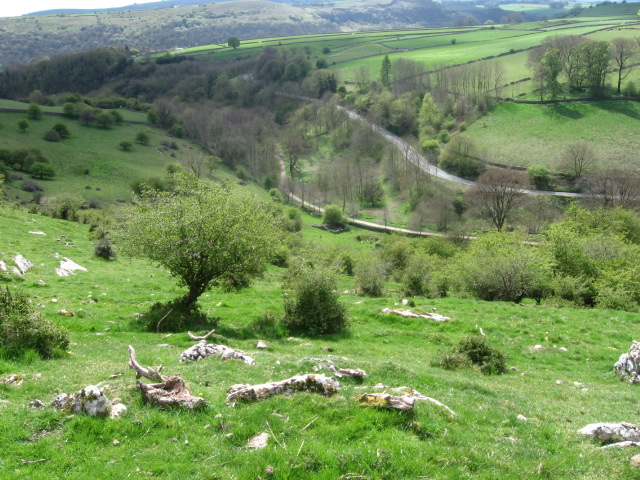
- View across Tideswell Dale
- Length: 1.1 miles (1.8 km) North-South
- Width: 250 metres (820 ft)
- Depth: 50 metres (164 ft)

Geography
- Location: Derbyshire, England
- Coordinates: 53.2663°N 1.7793°W
- Rivers: Brook Head
- Interactive map of Tideswell Dale

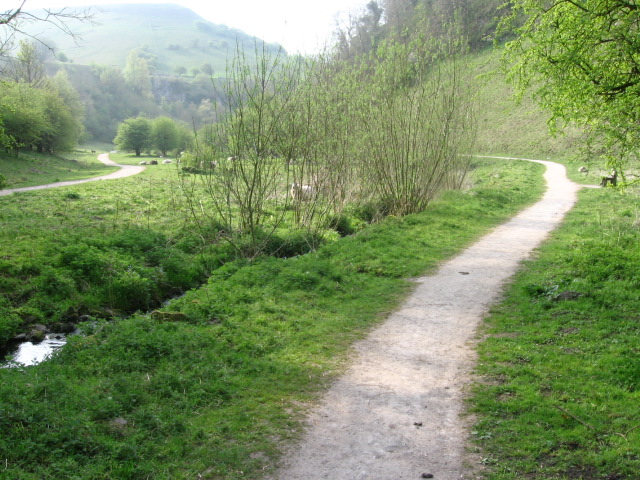
Footpath through Tideswell Dale

Tideswell Dale is a short dry limestone valley near Tideswell village, Derbyshire, in the Peak District of England. There is a farmland plateau on either side. The foot of the valley leads into Miller's Dale on the River Wye, which the valley's Brook Head stream runs into.

The Carboniferous limestone rocks of these dales were formed 350 million years ago from the shells and sediments of a tropical sea. The landscape was then sculpted by the ice sheets from the last Ice Age 20,000 years ago. The disused basalt quarry on the east side of Tideswell Dale is now a nature reserve. Stone was quarried from a sill of dolerite rock, which was the result of lava rising through the strata of the surrounding limestone 'Derbyshire Dome'. Tideswell Dale is part of the designated Wye Valley Site of Special Scientific Interest (SSSI) between Buxton and Bakewell, which also covers Cunning Dale, Woo Dale, Wye Dale, Chee Dale, Monsal Dale and Taddington Wood. These dales contain ancient ash and wych elm woodland. The many herbs and wild flowers include lady's bedstraw, bird's-foot trefoil, bloody cranesbill, devil's-bit scabious, saw-wort, ox-eye daisy, cowslip and common spotted-orchid. The upper valley sides are heathland habitat for bilberry and heather. The dale is also home to small heath and common blue butterflies.

Ravenstor at the foot of Tideswell Dale is a huge outcrop of overhanging rock. It is a challenging rock climbing location with over 200 graded routes, up to 50m long and including Mutation, graded 9a making it the hardest route in the Peak District. There are also several limestone buttresses in Tideswell Dale itself with established rock climbing pitches.

Access into Tideswell Dale is easy from the B6049 road which runs down the valley from Tideswell in the north to Miller's Dale, about 1 km west of the south end of the dale. Tideswell Dale car park is on the B6049 from where the footpath follows an avenue of mature beech trees. A footpath runs from the Monsal Trail, over the footbridge at Litton Mill up through the dale to Tideswell. There is also a parking area near Litton Mill.
