= Tideswell =

Village in Derbyshire, England

Coordinates: 53.273°N 1.774°W

- Village and Civil Parish
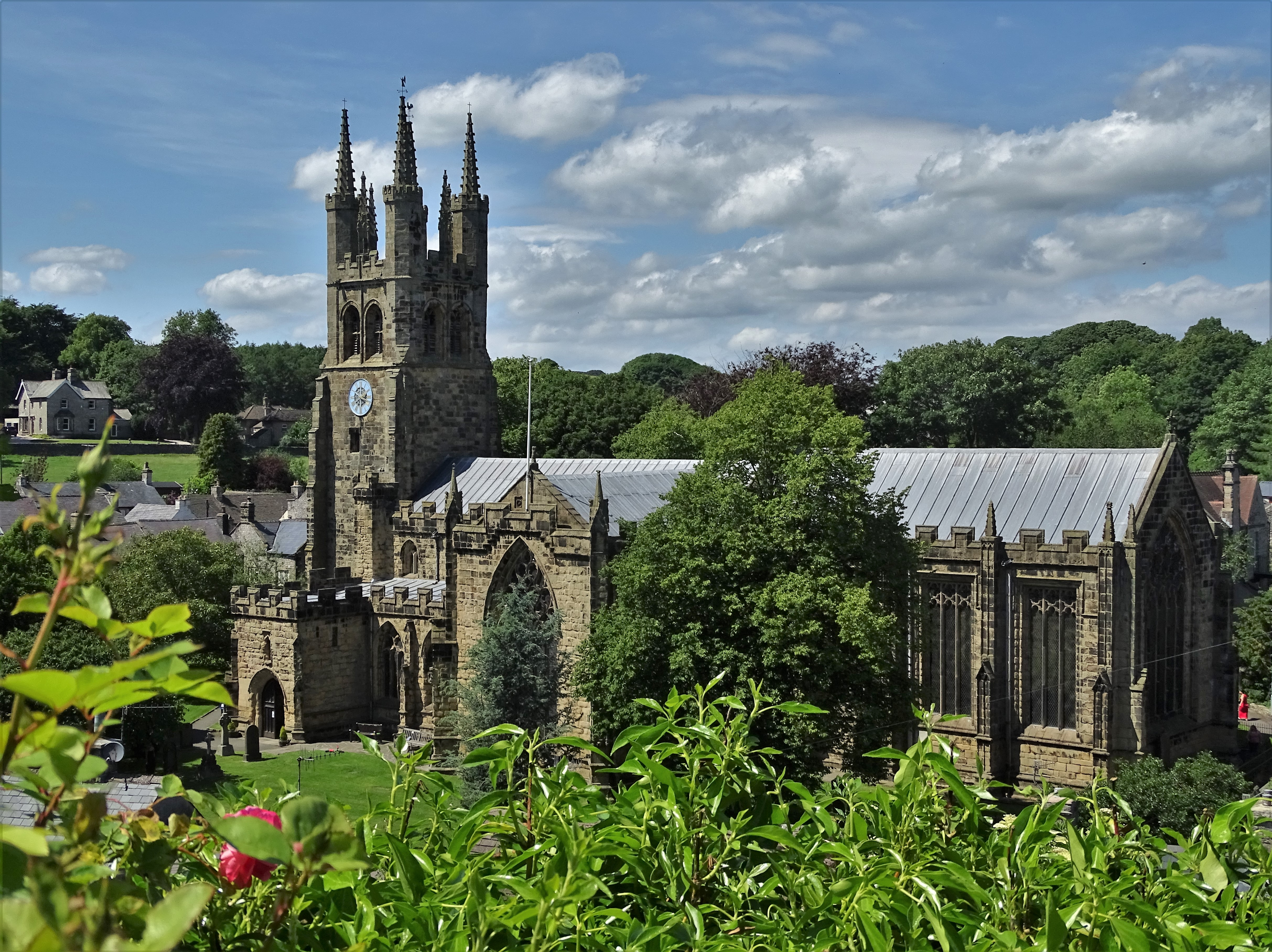
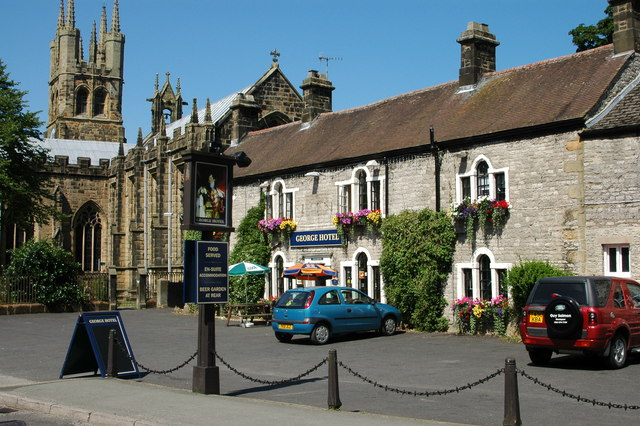
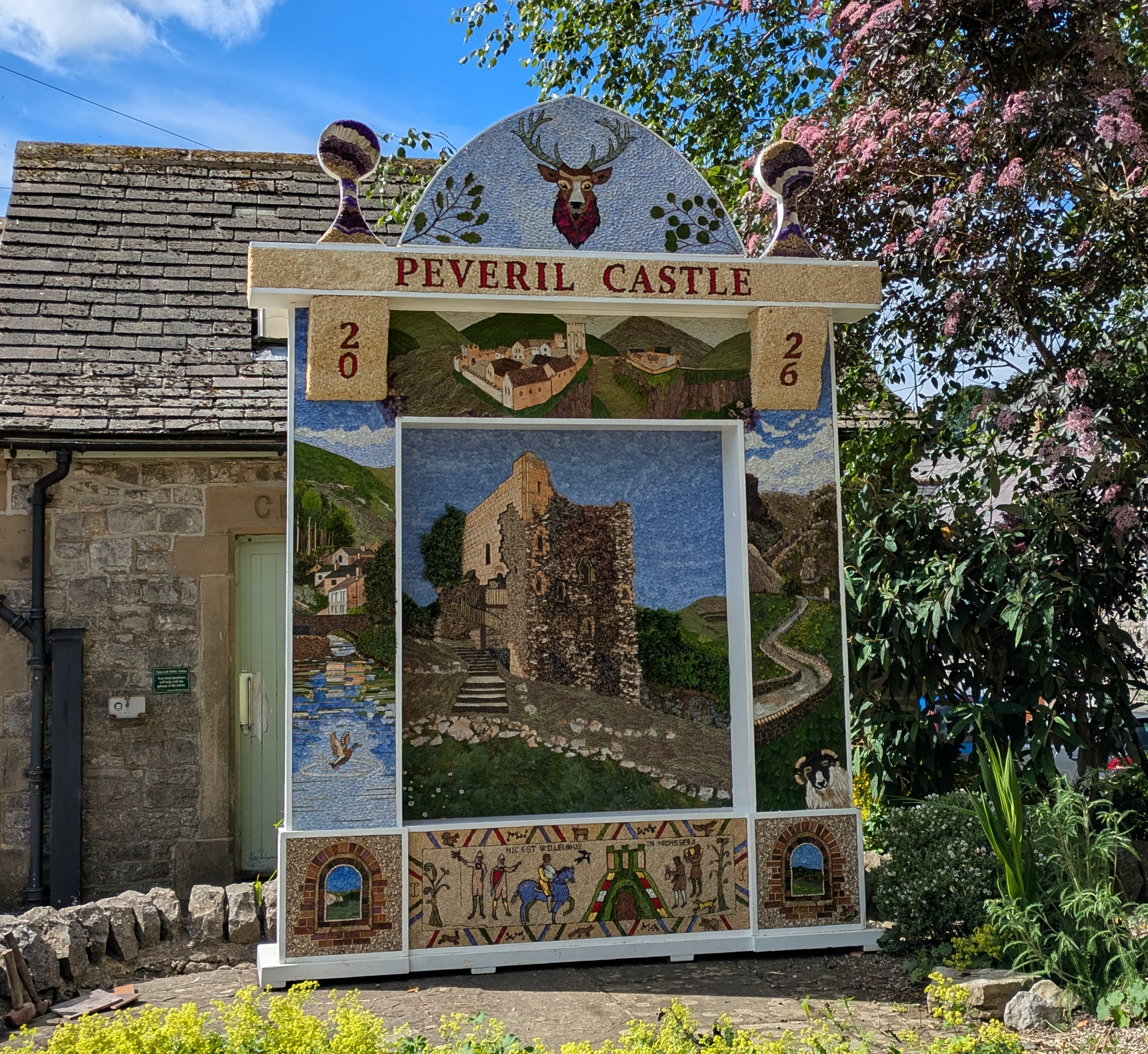
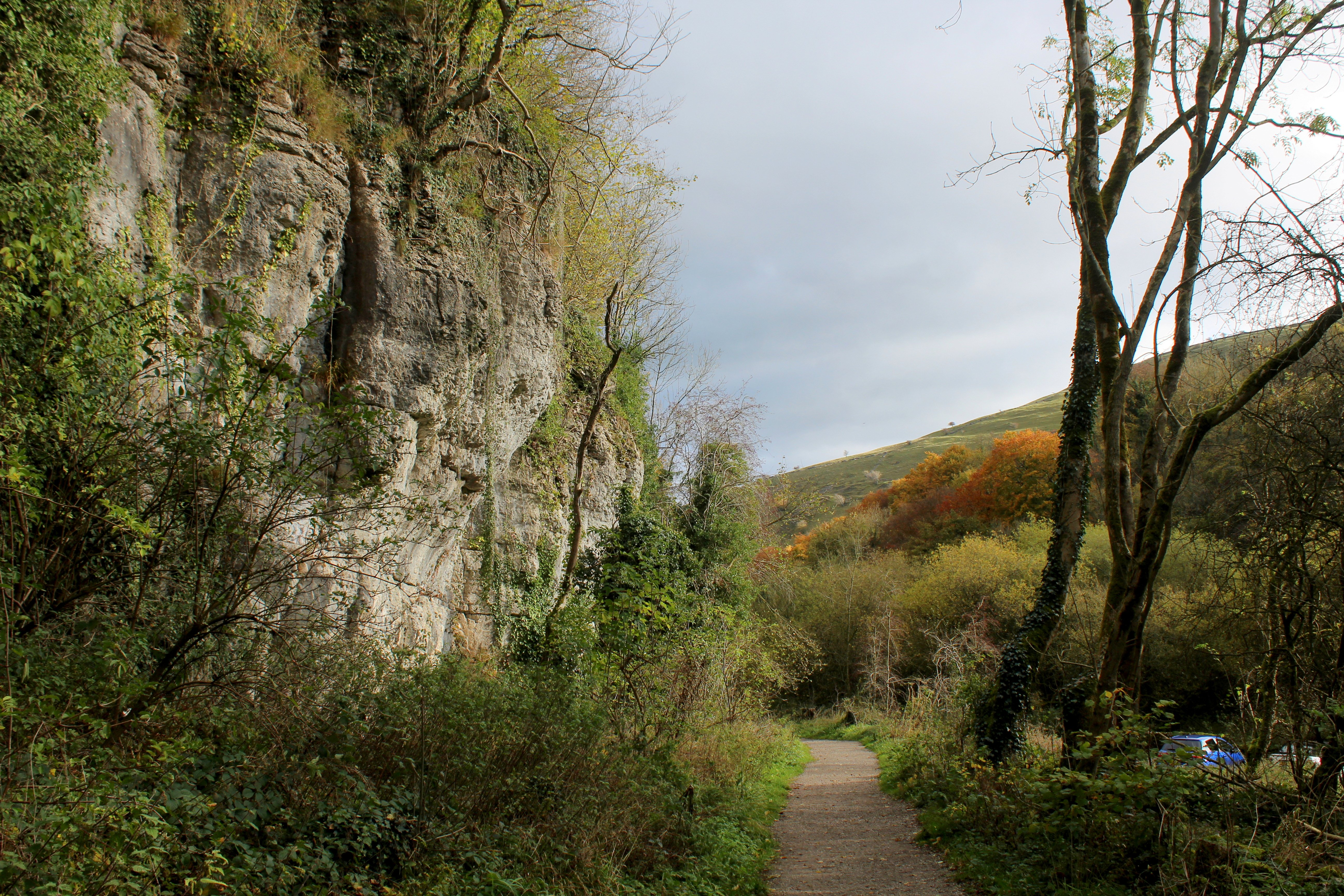
- The Cathedral of the Peak The George Hotel Well dressing Tideswell Dale

- Location within Derbyshire
- Population: 1,712 (2021)
- OS grid reference: SK1574
- Civil parish: Tideswell
- District: Derbyshire Dales
- Shire county: Derbyshire
- Region: East Midlands
- Country: England
- Sovereign state: United Kingdom
- Post town: BUXTON
- Postcode district: SK17
- Dialling code: 01298
- Police: Derbyshire
- Fire: Derbyshire
- Ambulance: East Midlands
- UK Parliament: Derbyshire Dales

Tideswell is a village, civil parish and ward in the Derbyshire Dales district of Derbyshire, England, in the Peak District National Park. It lies 6 miles (9.7 km) east of Buxton, in a wide valley on a limestone plateau, at an altitude of 1,000 feet (300 m) above sea level. At the 2021 census the population of the parish was 1,712, making it the third-largest settlement in the National Park after Bakewell and Hathersage.

Tideswell developed as a market town following the grant of a market charter in 1251. The historic village centre is a designated conservation area. It holds an annual well-dressing and Wakes Week celebration. It is best known for its Grade I listed parish church, St John the Baptist, built almost entirely in the 14th century and widely known as the "Cathedral of the Peak". Immediately south of the village is Tideswell Dale, a short limestone valley and nature reserve forming part of the Wye Valley Site of Special Scientific Interest.

== Toponymy ==
There is some debate about how Tideswell got its name. The English Place Name Society accepts it as being named after a Saxon chieftain named Tidi and the Old English word wella (spring or well); others suggest that the name comes from a tiding well in the north of the village. This ebbing-and-flowing well was declared to be one of the Seven Wonders of the Peak by Thomas Hobbes in his 1636 book De Mirabilibus Pecci.

Tideswell is known locally as Tidza or Tidsa. Residents are known as Sawyeds, owing to a traditional story about a farmer who freed his prize cow from a gate in which it had become entangled by sawing its head off.

== History and heritage ==
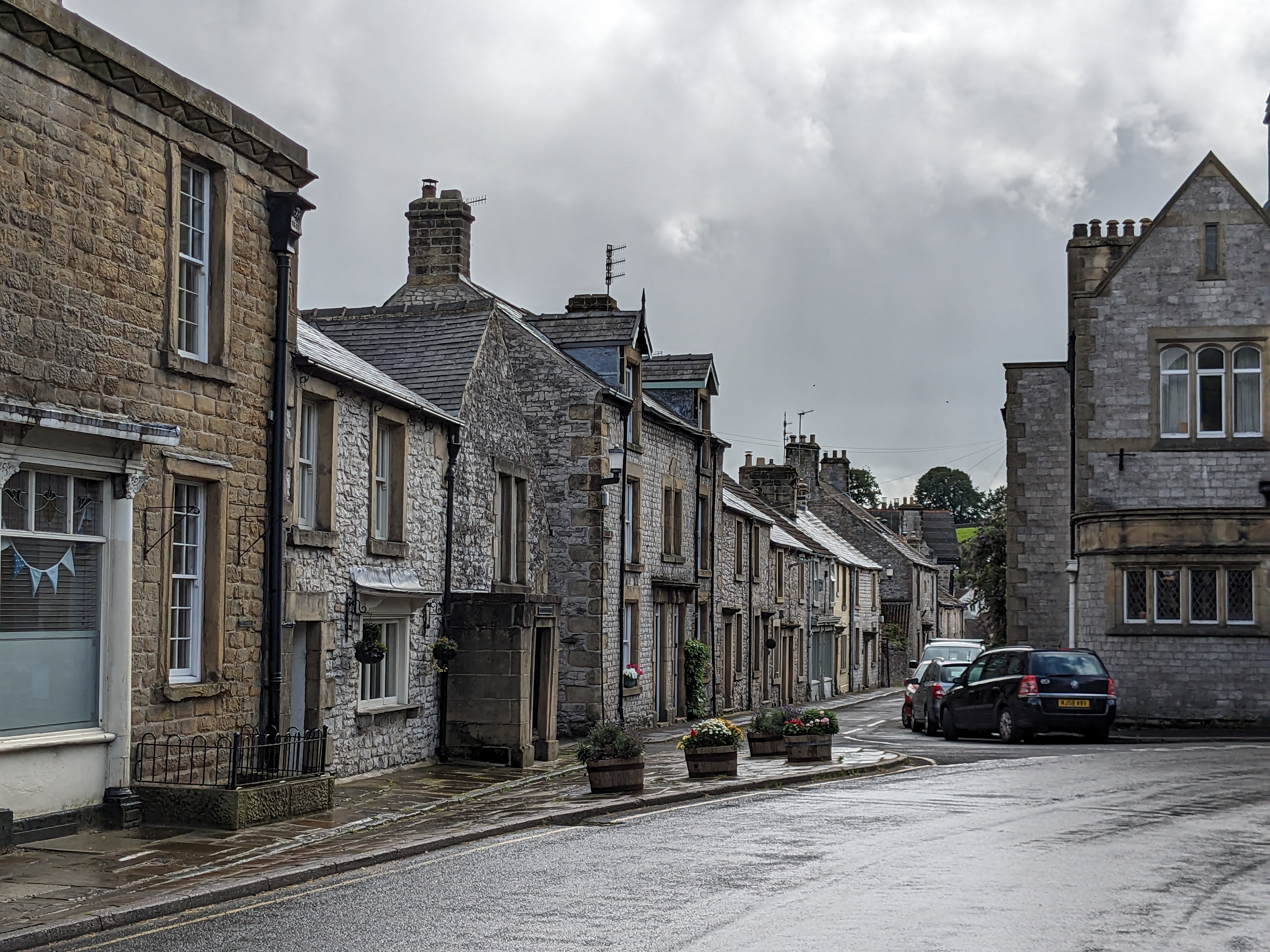
Street in Tideswell, Derbyshire

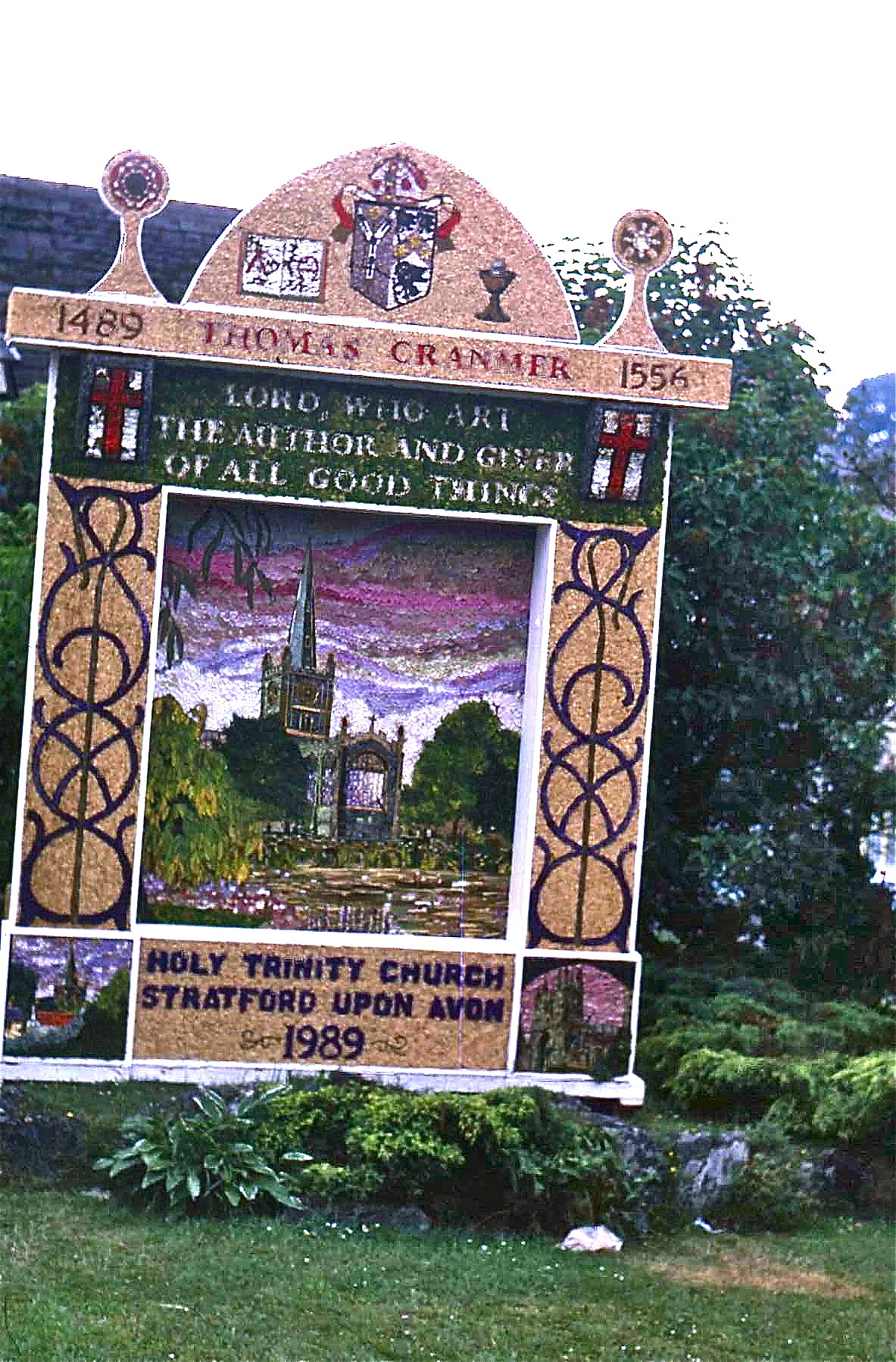
Tideswell well dressing is usually at the end of June

In the Middle Ages Tideswell was a market town known for lead mining. The Tideswell lead miners were renowned for their strength and much prized by the military authorities. Domesday Book of 1086 lists TIDESUUELLE as the King's land in the charge of William Peverel with fewer than five households.

Tideswell is now best known for its 14th-century parish church, the Church of St John the Baptist, known as the "Cathedral of the Peak", which contains three 15th-century misericords.

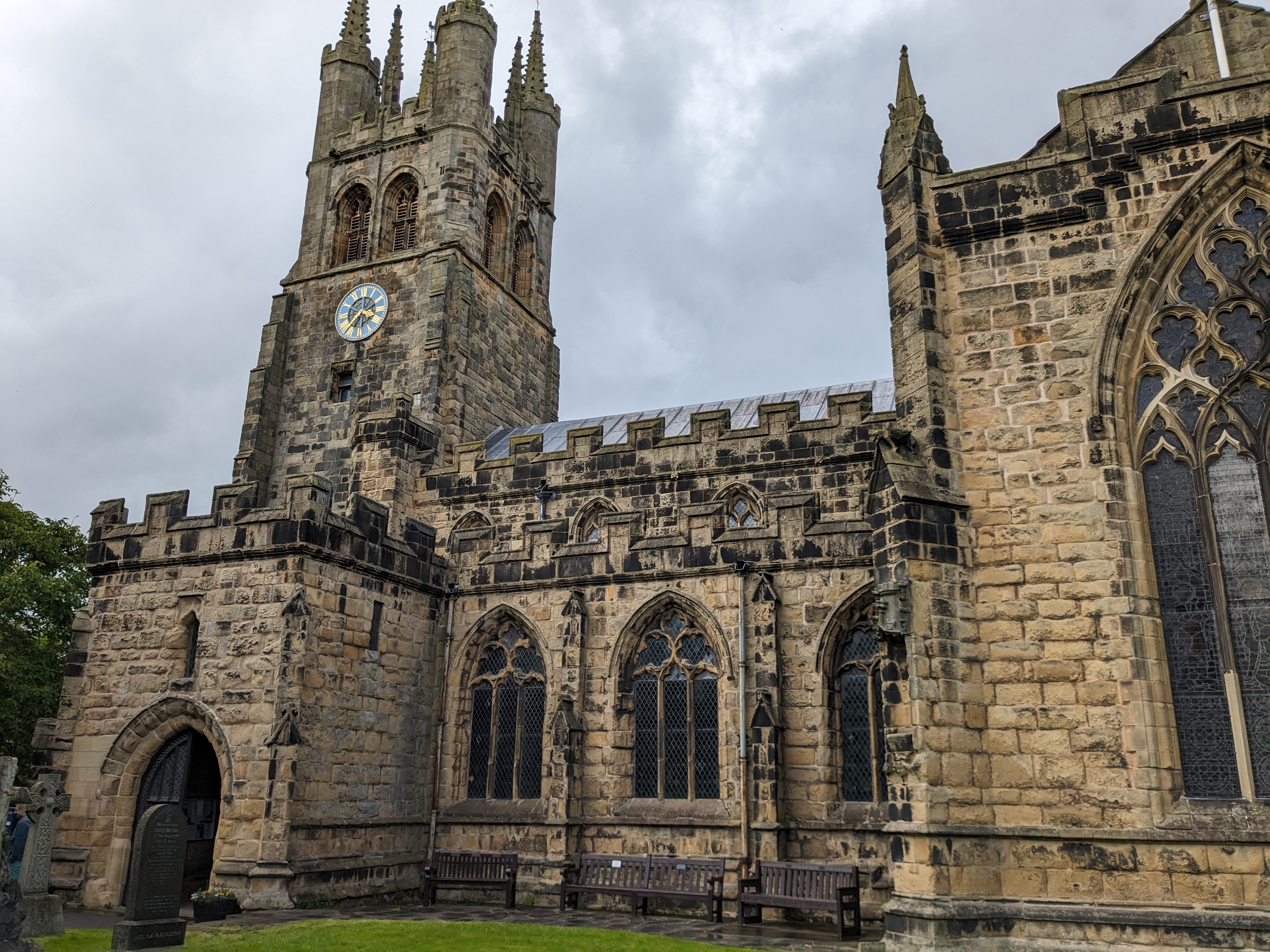
Outside the church of St John the Baptist, Tideswell

There is a sundial in the churchyard, on steps that local historian Neville T. Sharpe thinks likely to be those of the village's market cross. A market and two-day fair were granted to the village in 1251. The Foljambe family, later the Foljambe baronets, were the principal landowners from the fourteenth to the eighteenth centuries.

The population was recorded as 1,777 in the 1841 census. At that time the free grammar school educated about 70 boys.

The town has a week-long festival near the summer solstice known as the Wakes, culminating in "Big Saturday", which includes a torchlight procession through the streets led by a brass band playing a unique tune called the Tideswell Processional, and townsfolk dancing a traditional weaving dance.

=== Markeygate House ===
Markeygate House on Bank Square is thought to be the oldest dwelling in Tideswell, built in 1432. It is an English Heritage Grade II listed building that has undergone significant remodelling over time, having served as an ale house and family butcher.

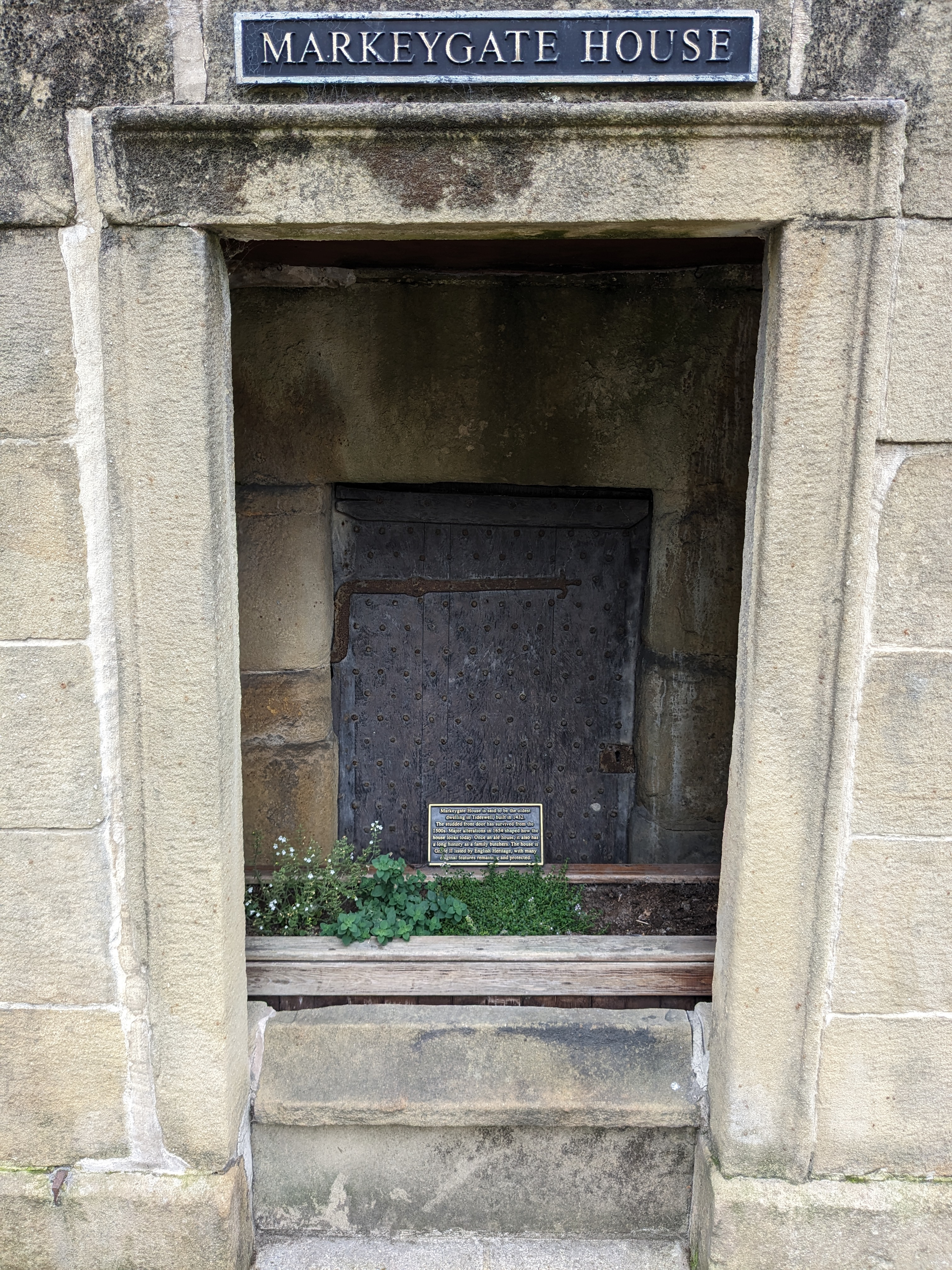
Markeygate House

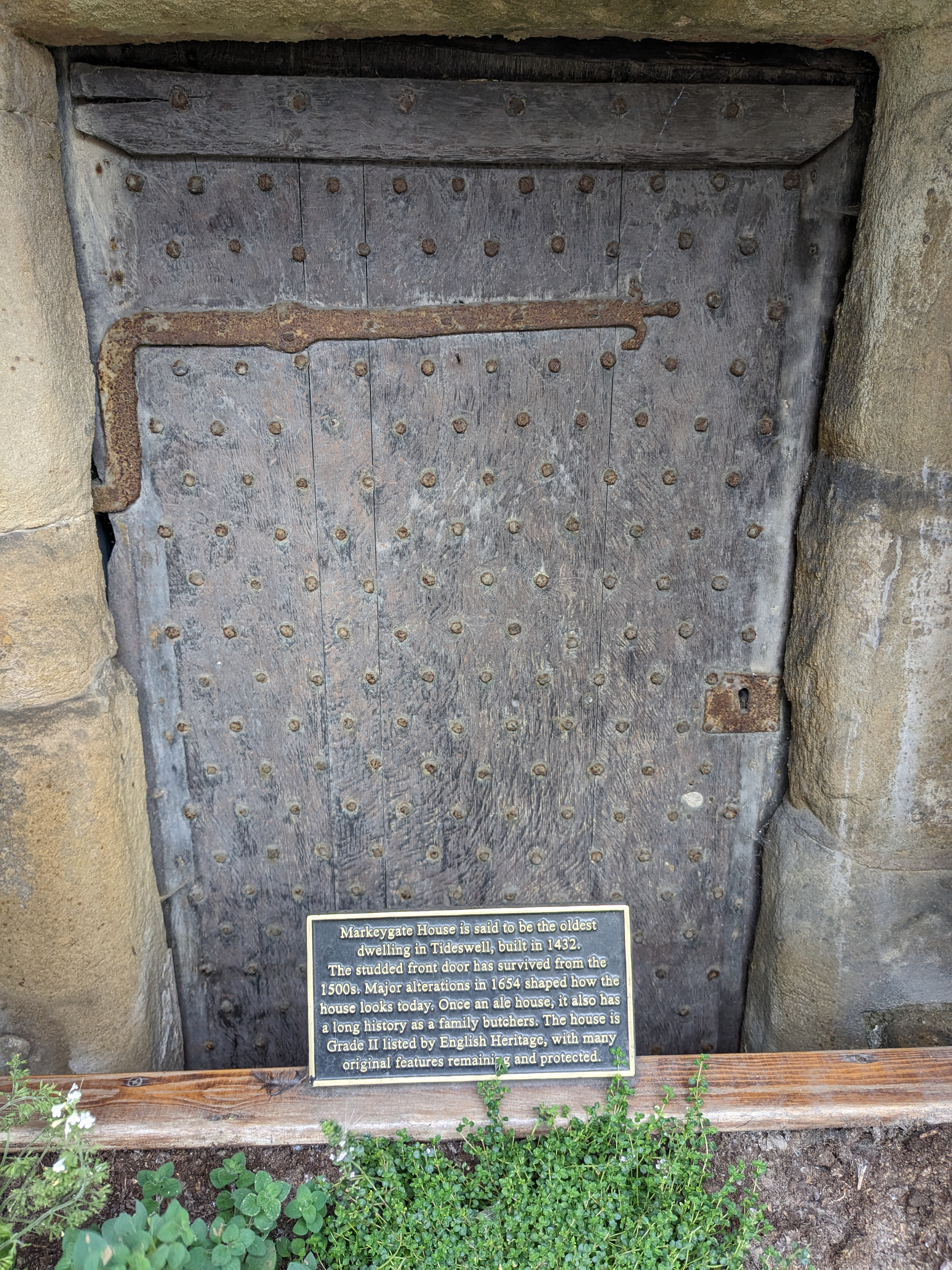
Detail of the door to Markeygate House

=== Taste Tideswell ===
In May 2009 Tideswell won a £400,000 grant from the Big Lottery Fund's Village SOS programme. In a bid to help keep its village shops open and thriving—more than 20 shops had closed in the preceding decade—Taste Tideswell was created to reconnect local people with their food and make Tideswell famous as a food destination. On 6 December 2010 the Tideswell School of Food opened, running full-priced cookery and brewing courses as well as subsidised community courses. The School of Food was intended to be the financial engine for the project that would help to develop work in the community but it closed during 2014 because of cashflow issues.

Tideswell Made is a quality mark that local food producers, retailers, public houses and holiday accommodation can buy into. Ensuring products are sourced as locally as possible and made locally, Tideswell Made is marketed by Taste Tideswell and helps local business get wider recognition for their locally made produce. Taste Tideswell has an education service, visiting schools with a variety of food- and growing-related activities. School groups also visit the School of Food for practical hands-on activities.

Behind the Parish Church a small community garden has been developed to provide a training ground for those wanting to learn more about growing. There is also a small commercial kitchen available for hire by local food producers, particularly those who are looking to make the step up from home-based production. In May 2011 the first Tideswell Food Festival was held, attracting more than 2,000 people despite poor weather.

On 7 September 2011 the Taste Tideswell story was broadcast as part of the Village SOS series on BBC One. It showed the rapid development of the project, along with the individual story of Tim Nicol, the 'Village Champion', who moved to Tideswell for a year and helped the volunteer directors get Taste Tideswell established. As of August 2011 Taste Tideswell employed eight members of staff, most of whom lived in the village, and had ten visiting chef/tutors on its books. Although the School of Food had to close, Tideswell's annual Food Festival has continued to be a success each year.

== Facilities and activities ==
Tideswell Sports Complex was built in 2001 following a £1.2 million Sports Lottery grant and substantial fund-raising in the village. There are two football pitches, a floodlit multi-use area with two tennis courts and five-a-side pitches marked out, a cricket ground, crown-green bowling area, a skate-park and two pavilions. The village has a football team, Tideswell United, which plays in the Hope Valley League 'A' Division. They also run a reserve side competing in the Hope Valley League B Division as Tideswell United Blue Star. The ground has floodlights for midweek games, one of few sides at such a low level to use them. The bowling club competes in local leagues and the cricket and tennis clubs in local friendly matches.

The village has a long theatrical tradition, Tideswell Theatre having been formed more than 200 years ago to perform leading plays of the time. It was revived in 2002 to bring professional-quality theatre, music, dance and comedy to the area. Tideswell Community Players are one of the oldest drama groups in the country, formed in 1929. Until the 1960s the village also had its own cinema, The Picturehouse. Tideswell Cinema was revived in 2005 to bring film once more to the community, with screenings for three seasons at Bishop Pursglove School's hall, before moving in 2008 to the upper storey of The George Hotel. A number of musical ensembles are also active in the village – notably Tideswell Male Voice Choir and the Tideswell Singers.

== Media ==
Local TV coverage is provided by BBC Yorkshire and BBC East Midlands on BBC One and ITV Yorkshire and ITV Central on ITV1. Television signals are received from either the Emley Moor transmitter via the Tideswell Moor relay transmitter or the Waltham transmitter via the Stanton Moor relay transmitter.

Local radio stations are BBC Radio Derby, Capital Midlands and Greatest Hits Radio Derbyshire (High Peak) (formerly High Peak Radio).

The village is served by the local newspapers the Peak Advertiser and Buxton Advertiser.

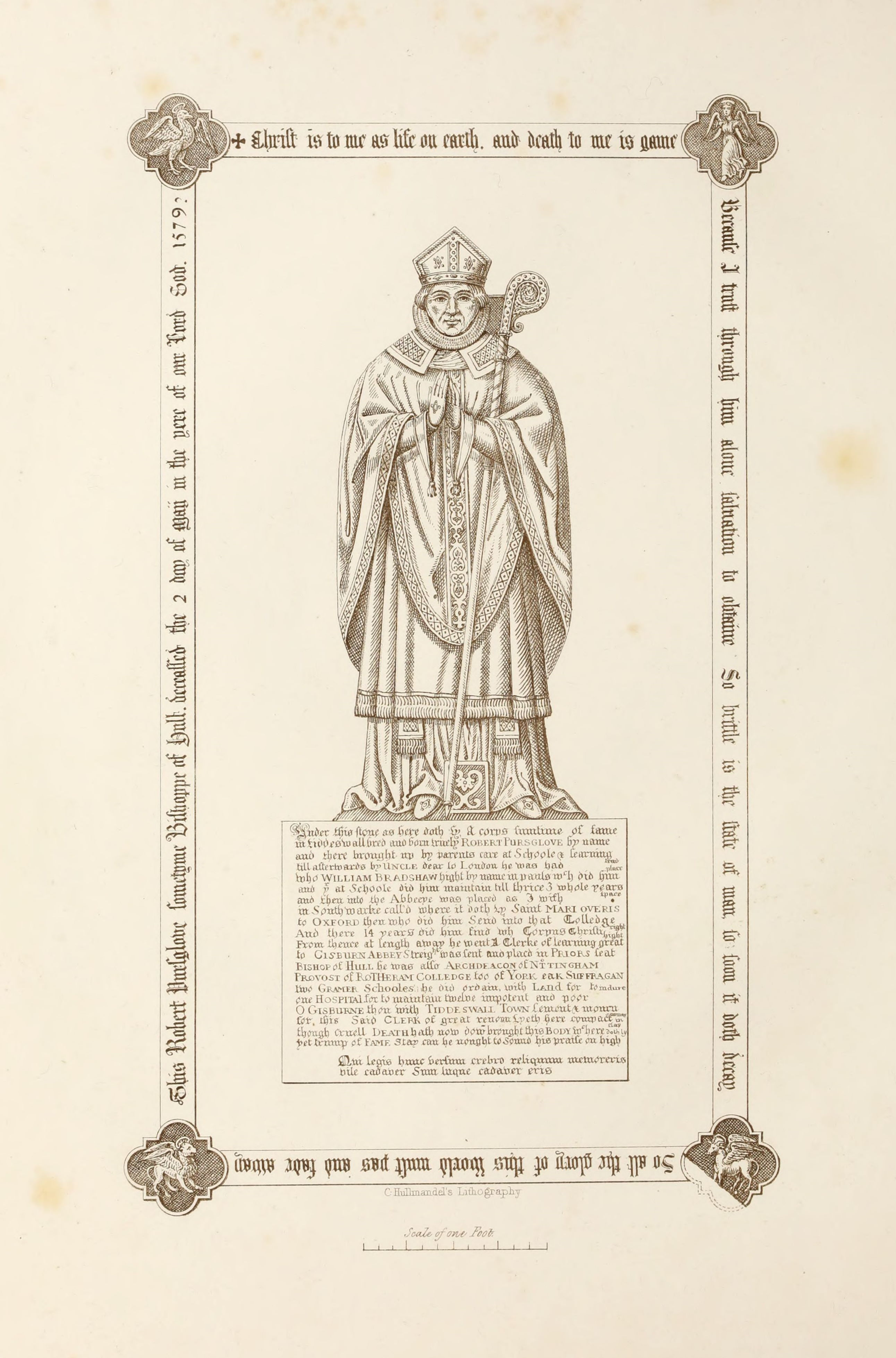
Robert Pursglove

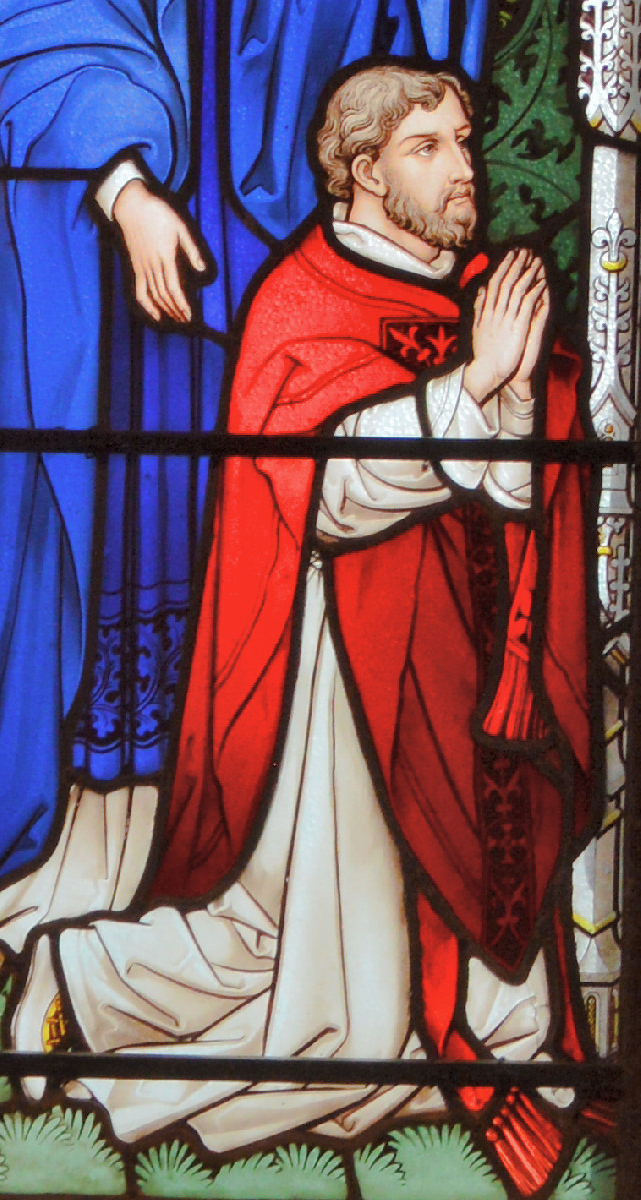
Nicholas Garlick

== Notable people ==
- Sir Godfrey de Foljambe (1317–76), a landowner and politician & Lord Chief Justice of Ireland
- Robert Pursglove, (1504–1579), an English bishop, buried in Tideswell church
- Blessed Nicholas Garlick (c. 1555–1588), Catholic priest and martyr, was a schoolmaster here in the 16th C.
- Blessed Christopher Buxton, (1562–1588), Catholic martyr, studied at Tideswell Grammar School under Nicholas Garlick
- William Newton (1750–1830), poet and philanthropist, was buried here.
- John Ashe (1671–1735), an English dissenting minister
- Samuel Slack (1757–1822), notable bass singer of local fame, reputedly sang before King George III
- Rev. J. M. J. Fletcher (1852–1940), historian & Vicar of Tideswell
- Advent Hunstone (1858–1927), an English woodcarver, helped restore St John the Baptist, Tideswell.
- Bernard Swindell (1901–1968), trade unionist, chairman of the National Union of General and Municipal Workers
- Bill Sellars (1925–2018), TV producer and director, worked on All Creatures Great and Small
- Ric Lee (born 1945), drummer of the blues/rock band Ten Years After, lives in Tideswell and sang with the male-voice choir
- Edwina Currie (born 1946), writer, broadcaster and former politician, served as MP for South Derbyshire from 1983 until 1997. She was the President of the Tideswell Male Voice Choir.
- Judy Leden (born 1959), stunt flyer and three times world hang-gliding champion
- Nigel Ayers (born 1957), multimedia artist and leader of the industrial music project Nocturnal Emissions
