= J. M. J. Fletcher =

James Michael John Fletcher (29 September 1852 – 23 February 1940), was an English clergyman of the Church of England, author and historian.

== Education ==
Fletcher was educated at Derby School and University College, Oxford.

== Career ==
- Vicar of Tideswell
- Rector of Wimborne Minster
- Canon of Salisbury
- Fellow of the Royal Historical Society

== Publications ==
- Distinguished Alumni of Derby School (Derby Reporter, 1872)
- A Guide to Tideswell (1902)
- Mrs Wightman of Shrewsbury: The Story of a Pioneer in Temperance Work (Longmans, Green & Co, London, 1906)
- A Historical and Descriptive Guide to the Churches of Shrewton, Maddington and Rollestone in the County of Wiltshire by J.M.J. Fletcher and Arthur S. Robins (1920)
- The Boy Bishop at Salisbury and Elsewhere (Salisbury, 1921)
- The Black Death in Dorset (1923)
- Notes on the Cathedral Church of St Mary the Blessed Virgin, Salisbury (Cathedral Chapter, Salisbury, 1924)
- The Stained Glass in Salisbury Cathedral, in Wiltshire Archaeological Magazine vol. xlv (1930)
- Old Belfry in the Close, in Wiltshire Archaeological Magazine vol. xlvii (1932)
- Seth Ward, Bishop of Salisbury, in Wiltshire Archaeological Magazine vol. xlix
- Dorset Worthy, William Stone, Royalist and Divine (1615-1685) (in Proceedings of the Dorset Natural History and Antiquarian Field Club volume 36)
- Dorset Royal Peculiar (in Proceedings of the Dorset Natural History and Antiquarian Field Club volume 38)
- Sir Thomas Dackomb, Priest, Rector of Tarrant Gunville, 1549-1567, a Dorset Bibliophile (in Proceedings of the Dorset Natural History and Antiquarian Field Club volume 44)
- Century of Dorset Documents (in Proceedings of the Dorset Natural History and Antiquarian Field Club volume 44)
- Trio of Dorchester Worthies (in Proceedings of the Dorset Natural History and Antiquarian Field Club volume 44)
- Dorset Men in London at the End of the 17th Century (in Proceedings of the Dorset Natural History and Antiquarian Field Club volume 54)
- Thomas Bennet (1924)
- Incumbents of Salisbury Churches during the Commonwealth
- The Plague-Stricken Derbyshire Village: or What to See in and around Eyam (1930)
- Bishop Giles of Bridport, 1257-1262 in Wiltshire Archaeological Magazine vol. xlvi (1934)
- Chained Books in Dorset and Elsewhere (Dorset Natural History and Archaeological Society, Vol. 35)
- Fletcher, J.M.J. (1913). "The Marriage of St. Cuthburga, who was afterwards foundress of the Monastery at Wimborne". Proceedings of the Dorset Natural History and Archaeological Society. 34: 167–185.

=== Editor ===
Fletcher edited the journal Proceedings of the Dorset Natural History and Antiquarian Field Club between 1917 and 1932.
