= Magpie Mine =

Disused lead mine in Derbyshire, England

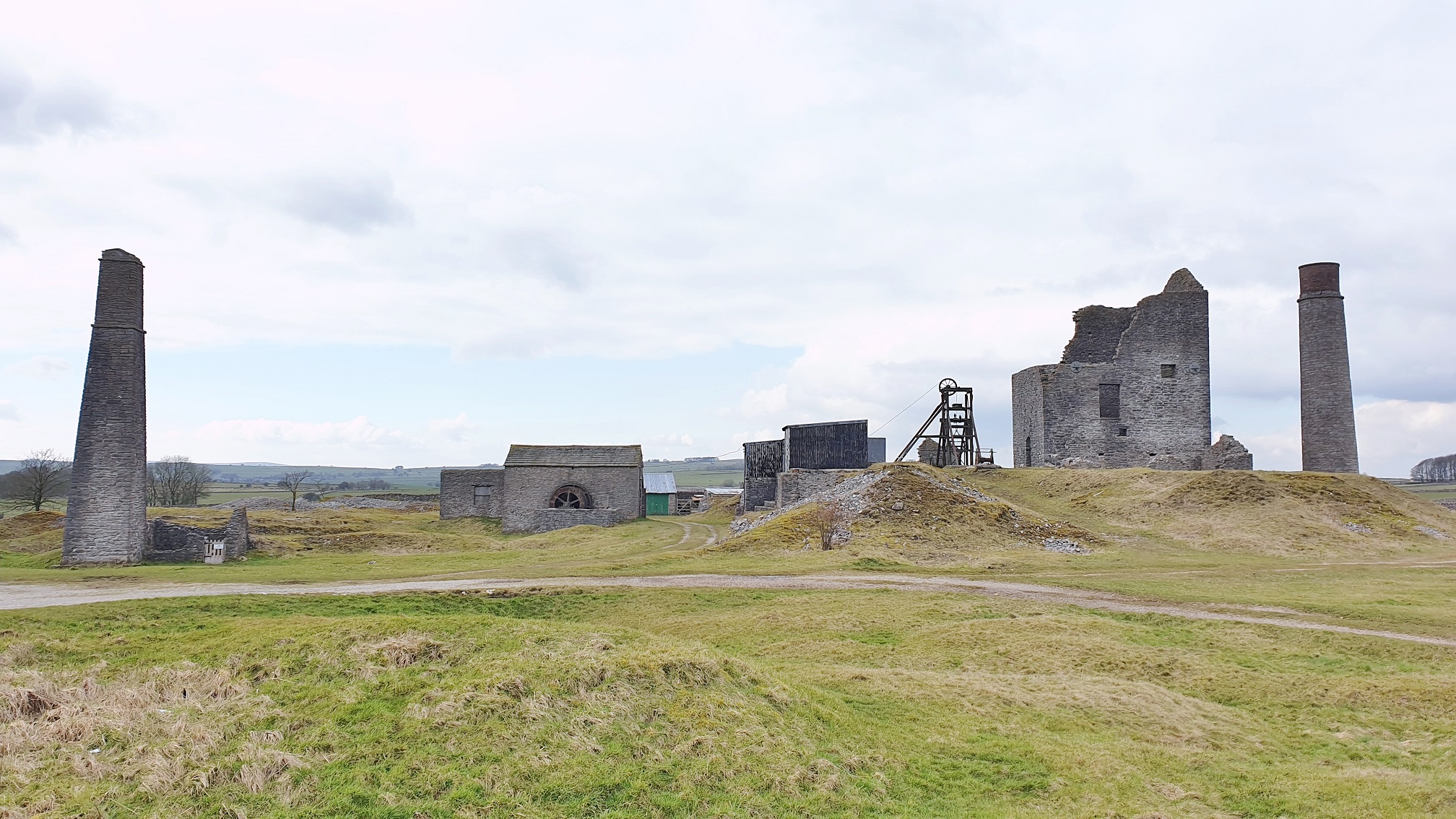
- Lead mine remains
- Interactive map of Magpie Mine
- 53°12′42″N 1°44′32″W
- Type: Mine
- Periods: 17th century
- Location: Sheldon near Bakewell
- Region: Derbyshire, England

Site notes
- Elevation: 310 m (1,020 ft)
- Condition: Standing building remains
- Public access: Footpath
- Website: https://pdmhs.co.uk/magpie-mine-peak-district/

Scheduled monument
- Official name: Magpie, Dirty Red Soil, Maypit, Horsesteps and Great Red Soil lead mines
- Designated: 15 January 1974
- Reference no.: 1019490

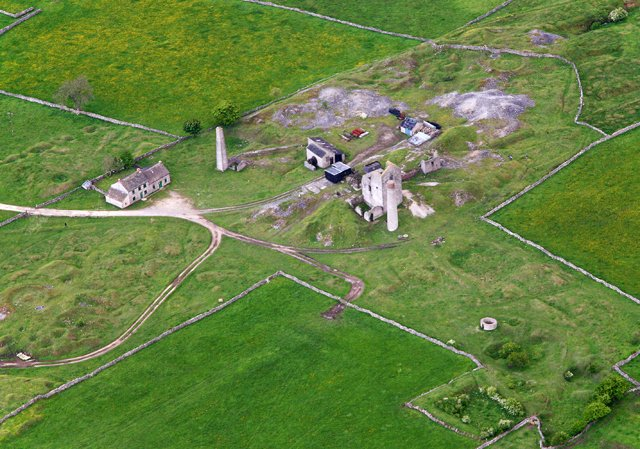
Aerial view of Magpie Mine

Magpie Mine is a well-preserved disused lead mine near the village of Sheldon in Derbyshire, England, in the parish of Ashford in the Water. The walled enclosure of five lead mines (Magpie Mine, Dirty Red Soil, Great Red Soil, Maypit and Horsesteps) is a protected Scheduled Monument.

Mid-Derbyshire has a history of industrial lead mining going back to Roman times. Lead mining at this site goes back to at least the 17th century. The Shuttlebark vein of lead ore was officially opened in 1682. Magpie Mine is recorded back to 1740. After over 200 years of operation, Magpie Mine closed in 1958 and was the last working lead mine in Derbyshire. The Peak District Mines Historical Society now manages the site and has undertaken much restoration work.

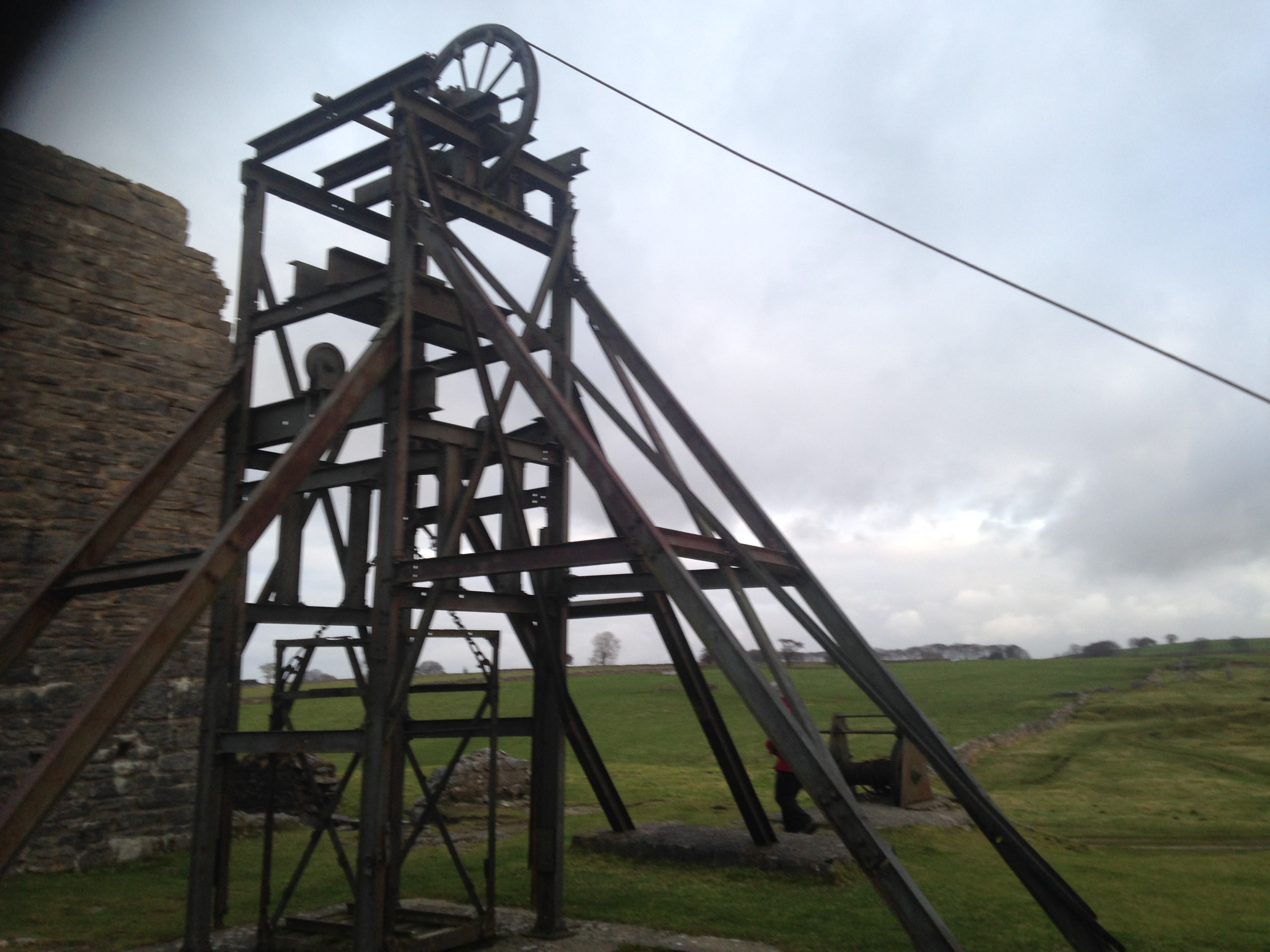
Headgear of the main shaft

Between productive, profitable times, there were closures for several years in 1793 and in 1835 because of floods, disputes and drops in the price of lead. In 1833 a bitter dispute led to three miners from the neighbouring Maypitt Mine being suffocated by smoke from fires lit deliberately by miners from the Magpie Mine. A murder trial followed but all of the 24 suspected culprits were freed because they had been provoked and it was also unclear which of them was actually responsible.

The renowned mining engineer John Taylor took over management of the mine in 1839 and he established a complex of new limestone buildings and innovative equipment. The square chimney (renovated in 2016) and the circular chimney were both built in 1840. The agent's house, smithy, winding house (now demolished), circular gunpowder house and engine reservoir (to supply boiler and cooling water to the engines) were all constructed in the 1840s. In 1869 the Cornish engine house replaced an earlier engine house building and the winding engine was installed, with the winding drum that still remains. The main shaft was sunk in 1823 and is over 200m deep. The underground channel used to drain floodwater from the mines (the sough) was built from 1873 to 1881 and runs about 2 kilometres (1.2 mi) to its outlet into the River Wye to the north (carrying several million litres of water per day). The mine closed with financial troubles in 1883. It was operating for brief spells between 1913 and 1923 but was then only reopened again in 1950, before finally closing down in 1958. The existing steelwork frame of the headgear above the main shaft and the corrugated iron winding house are from the 1950s.

A reproduction horse gin has been set up at the Red Soil mine shaft, where the original horse-powered winding gear was used to lift lead ore up to the surface.

There is visitor access to the site along footpaths from Sheldon (about 500m north) and from lanes to the west, south and east.

== See also ==
- Odin Mine
