= Listed buildings in Ashford-in-the-Water =

Ashford-in-the-Water is a civil parish in the Derbyshire Dales district of Derbyshire, England. The parish contains 62 listed buildings that are recorded in the National Heritage List for England. Of these, two are listed at Grade II*, the middle of the three grades, and the others are at Grade II, the lowest grade. The parish contains the village of Ashford-in-the-Water and the surrounding countryside, which includes two country houses, Ashford Hall and Thornbridge Hall. These are both listed, together with associated structures and items in their grounds. The River Wye passes through the parish, and four bridges crossing it are listed. Most of the other listed buildings are houses, cottages and associated structures, and the others include a church, a churchyard cross, a former watermill, two public houses, a farmhouse, farm buildings, a vicarage, a well, a dovecote, and a milepost.

== Key ==
Grade	Criteria
II*	Particularly important buildings of more than special interest
II	Buildings of national importance and special interest

== Buildings ==
Name and location	Photograph	Date	Notes	Grade
Holy Trinity Church; 53.22420°N 1.70935°W		12th century	The church has been altered and extended through the centuries, and it was almost completely rebuilt between 1868 and 1870, retaining some older internal features. It is built in gritstone with tile roofs, and consists of a nave, a north aisle, a south porch, a chancel, and a west tower. The tower has two stages, string courses, clock faces on the north and south, paired bell openings with round heads, and an embattled parapet with corner finials.	II
Churchyard cross 53.22410°N 1.70920°W		15th century	The remains of the cross are in the churchyard of Holy Trinity Church. They are in gritstone and consist of an octagonal base of four steps, on which is a tapering octagonal column that has a moulded top with decoration, and a hole in the centre.	II
18 Greaves Lane; 53.22580°N 1.70816°W	—	17th century	A cottage with a timber framed core, encased in rendered stone, and with a slate roof and a stone ridge. There are two storeys and two bays. The cottage contains a doorway and casement windows, some of which are mullioned. Inside there is a cruck timber frame.	II
Ardrock Cottage; 53.22189°N 1.71249°W		17th century	The cottage, which has been extended, is in limestone with gritstone dressings, quoins, and a tile roof with a stone ridge. The main doorway has a quoined surround and an initialled and dated lintel, and there are later inserted doorways. The windows are mullioned and contain casements.	II
Great Batch; 53.22416°N 1.70783°W		17th century	The house, which was later extended, is in limestone with gritstone dressings, quoins, and a stone slate roof. There are three storeys and an L-shaped plan, with double gables facing the street and on the garden front, and a 20th-century conservatory. In the centre is a stone porch, and the windows are mullioned, or mullioned and transomed.	II
Honeysuckle Cottage; 53.22437°N 1.70896°W		17th century	The cottage is in limestone and gritstone, with gritstone dressings, quoins, and a stone slate roof. There are two storeys, with a lower section to the east. The windows are casements, some with single lights, and the others are mullioned.	II
The Retreat; 53.22422°N 1.70618°W		17th century	The house, which was altered in the early 19th century, is at right angles to the street, and is in limestone with gritstone dressings, quoins, and a stone slate roof with moulded gable coping on the north wall. There are two storeys and an attic, and three bays. The central doorway is flanked by sash windows, and in the upper floor are two-light mullioned windows.	II
Mill Bridge; 53.22323°N 1.70328°W		1664	The bridge carries a road over the River Wye. It is in limestone and gritstone, it consists of three segmental arches, and the cutwaters rise to form triangular pedestrian refuges. The bridge has a string course, and a parapet with chamfered copings that splay outwards at the ends. On the east side is an inscribed and dated stone.	II
Old Tithe Barn; 53.22395°N 1.71001°W		1680	The barn, which was converted for residential use in around the 1980s, is in limestone with gritstone dressings, quoins, and a stone slate roof with moulded gable copings and plain kneelers. There are two storeys and three bays. On the front is a doorway with a quoined surround and a large lintel, and to the east a doorway with a dated and initialled lintel converted into a window. There are various other windows, ventilation slits, and bee holes in some quoins.	II
Bridge at the Rookery; 53.22340°N 1.71349°W		18th century	The bridge carries a road over the River Wye. It is in limestone with gritstone dressings, and consists of four arches, the middle two segmental, and the outer two are stilted semicircular arches. The bridge has projecting keystones, parapets with square coping that splay outwards at the ends, and at the south side is a wooden gate.	II
Lees Bridge; 53.22241°N 1.70289°W		18th century	The bridge carries a road over the River Wye. It is in gritstone, and consists of four segmental arches, with large cutwaters to the east, and small stepped cutwaters to the west. The bridge has a string course, and a low parapet with chamfered coping that curves outwards to end in octagonal piers.	II
Old Mill House; 53.22269°N 1.70370°W		18th century	The miller's house is in limestone with gritstone dressings, chamfered quoins, and a stone slate roof with coped gables and moulded kneelers. There are two storeys, three bays, and a single-storey extension to the east. In the centre is a doorway with a bracketed hood, and most of the windows are casements with mullions.	II
Rookery Cottage; 53.22389°N 1.71337°W		18th century	A house in limestone, with gritstone dressings, and a roof of stone slate at the front and slate at the rear, with a coped gable and a moulded kneeler on the west. There are two storeys, a double-depth plan, and three bays. In the centre is a full-height canted bay window with a pyramidal roof and a segmental-headed doorway. Most of the windows are mullioned, some have been replaced by sashes, and at the rear is a blocked mullioned and transomed window.	II
Sheepwash Bridge; 53.22323°N 1.71041°W		18th century	The bridge, which crosses the River Wye, is in limestone, it consists of three shallow segmental arches, and the cutwaters rise to form triangular pedestrian refuges. The bridge has voussoirs, hood moulds over each arch, and coped parapets that splay out at the ends. On the south bank, the wall curves to form a pen, opening towards the river for sheep dipping.	II*
The Mill; 53.22232°N 1.70440°W		18th century	A former water-powered corn mill and kiln, it has been altered and extended, and later used for other purposes. The building is in limestone, with gritstone dressings, and quoins. The mill has a stone slate roof, over the kiln is a pantile roof, and there is a complex plan. The north front has two storeys, a projecting wing on the right, and a former wheel pit. There are windows of various type, a taking-in door, and the kiln has a louvred ridge vent.	II
Thornbridge Hall; 53.23501°N 1.70478°W		18th century	A country house that was much altered in 1871 and again in 1896, and later used for other purposes. It is in limestone with sandstone dressings, quoins, and coped parapets, partly embattled. The house is in two and three storeys, with a four-storey tower, and an irregular plan, and there is a quadrangular stable block to the north. The main doorway has a Tudor arch, most of the windows are mullioned and transomed, and there are bay windows. The stable block has one storey, and a two-storey embattled tower with corbelled parapets and an octagonal cupola with clock faces and an octagonal dome.	II
Gates, eastern entrance, Thornbridge Hall; 53.23020°N 1.70210°W	—	18th century	The gates are in cast iron and the gate piers are in gritstone. There is a central pair of gates, and smaller side gates, all with scroll decoration. The gate piers consist of a central pair about 10 feet (3.0 m) high and an outer pair about 8 feet (2.4 m) high. The central pair have raised and fielded panels, banded rustication on the sides, moulded cornices, and urn finials with projecting griffin heads. The outer piers have banded rustication on all sides, and similar urns. Walls extend to the west with moulded copings, and end in urns with fluted bases, and decorated with foliage and dogs' heads.	II
6 Watts Green; 53.22385°N 1.70812°W		Late 18th century	A cottage in limestone with gritstone dressings, and a slate roof with a stone ridge. There are two storeys and one bay. The cottage contains a doorway and two-light mullioned windows.	II
Ashford Arms Hotel; 53.22442°N 1.70703°W		Late 18th century	The public house is in limestone with painted stone dressings, chamfered rusticated quoins, an eaves band, and a slate roof with coped gables and moulded kneelers. There are three storeys and three bays. The central doorway has a stepped architrave, a rectangular fanlight, and a bracketed stone hood. The windows are sashes, and in the east gable end is a tall transomed stair window.	II
Gardener's house and walls, Ashford Hall; 53.22542°N 1.70054°W		Late 18th century	The house is in gritstone on a plinth, with quoins, an eaves band, and a hipped slate roof. There are two storeys and three bays. In the centre is a tetrastyle portico in antis with Tuscan columns and a plain pediment. Inside the portico are doorways with stepped architraves. The outer bays each contains a Venetian window in the ground floor, and a Diocletian window above. The house is flanked by curving coped espalier walls in brick with some gritstone. The doorways are on the sides of the house. On the eastern side, the doorway is approached by steps flanked by piers with moulded cornices and ball finials.	II
Stable Block, Ashford Hall; 53.22467°N 1.70269°W	—	Late 18th century	The stable block is in gritstone on a plinth, with a string course, an eaves band, and a hipped slate roof. There are two storeys and four bays, and single-storey two-bay flanking wings. The middle two bays project under a moulded pediment with an oculus in the tympanum. In the centre is a later glazed porch on cast iron columns, and double doors with a fanlight, and the outer bays contain doorways with semicircular fanlights. In the upper floor are flat-headed windows. The wings contain semicircular arches with fanlights, in the outer bays with a doorway and in the inner bays with a window.	II
Gate piers and walls, Stable Block, Ashford Hall; 53.22449°N 1.70268°W	—	Late 18th century	The gate piers and walls are in gritstone. The piers are square and rusticated with domed tops, and on the inner sides are pilasters with scrolled tops. The flanking walls have chamfered copings.	II
Bulls Head Inn; 53.22440°N 1.70832°W		Late 18th century	The public house is in rendered stone and has a stone slate roof, with coped gables on the main part, and a slate roof on the extension. There are two storeys and two bays, and a lower single-bay extension on the right. The doorway has a moulded hood, and the windows are sashes, those in the main part are mullioned with two lights, and in the extension they have single lights.	II
Clematis Cottage and adjoining cottage 53.22498°N 1.70714°W		Late 18th century	A pair of cottages in limestone with painted dressings, a roof of slate to the south and tile to the north. There are two storeys and each cottage has one bay, a doorway with a bracketed hood, and two-light mullioned windows.	II
Shamble Cottage; 53.22605°N 1.70878°W		Late 18th century	A cottage and a former workshop, in limestone with gritstone dressings, quoins, and a slate roof. There are three storeys and two bays. In the centre is a stone porch, and the windows are mullioned, containing 20th-century casements, the window in the top floor with six lights.	II
The Rookery; 53.22372°N 1.71389°W		Late 18th century	The house, probably with an earlier core, is in limestone with gritstone dressings, and a stone slate roof with a coped gable and moulded kneeler on the west. There are two storeys and an irregular plan, with a front of five bays, and a projecting cross-wing. There are two doorways with bracketed hoods, one blocked. Most of the windows are sashes, some of which are mullioned, in the cross-wing is a full-height canted bay window, to the west is a Venetian window, and at the rear is a double-transomed stair window.	II
Ashford Hall; 53.22452°N 1.70193°W		c. 1776–77	A small country house in Palladian style, it is built in stone, and has a rusticated ground floor, string courses, a bracketed eaves cornice, a balustraded parapet, and a slate roof. There are three storeys, five bays on the front and three on the sides. In the centre is a doorway with Ionic columns, a decorated frieze, and a dentilled pediment. The windows are sashes, in the ground floor they are set in round-headed recesses. In the middle floor they have moulded architraves, alternate segmental and triangular pediments, and below them are baluster pilasters. To the south is an early 19th-century conservatory.	II*
Cartshed, Ashford Hall; 53.22476°N 1.70297°W	—	Early 19th century	The cartshed is in limestone with gritstone dressings, quoins, and a stone slate roof with coped gables, kneelers, and finials. There is a single storey, and the cartshed contains a large segmental arch with a quoined surround, double stable doors, and vents.	II
Churchdale Cottage; 53.23447°N 1.69406°W		Early 19th century (probable)	The cottage is in limestone with gritstone dressings, and has a stone slate roof. There are two storeys and two bays. The doorway has a quoined surround, an initialled and dated lintel, and a flat hood. The windows are mullioned with casements, those in the upper floor in gabled dormers.	II
Gritstone House and wall 53.22586°N 1.70803°W		Early 19th century	The house is in gritstone with rendered side walls, a sill band, an eaves band, and a tile roof with a stone ridge, coped gables and moulded kneelers. There are three storeys and three bays. In the centre is a doorway with a semicircular head, pilasters, a traceried fanlight, and a bracketed stone hood. The windows are sashes, and the front garden is enclosed by a coped stone wall.	II
Ivy House and wall 53.22517°N 1.70734°W		Early 19th century	The house is in limestone with gritstone dressings, quoins, and a slate roof. There are two storeys and two bays. The doorway has a flat hood, and the windows are two-light sashes with mullions. The garden wall has a stone slab base and hooped iron railings.	II
Longroods Farmhouse, outbuildings and walls 53.23739°N 1.72191°W	—	Early 19th century	The farmhouse and outbuildings, which were extended in 1861, are under a continuous roof. They are in limestone with gritstone dressings, quoins to the west, and a stone slate roof with coped gables and kneelers. There are two storeys, and the house has three bays, a doorway with a bracketed moulded hood, and sash window, some with mullions. At the rear is a porch with an initialled and dated lintel. The outbuilding to the east contains a small-paned window and has a lean-to. Attached to the front of the house is a limestone garden wall with rounded gritstone copings.	II
Milepost; 53.22449°N 1.70652°W		Early 19th century	The milepost on the north side of Church Street is in cast iron. It consists of a circular shaft carrying a cylinder with a moulded top, divided into panels. Embossed along the top is "LONDON", and painted on the panels are the distances to Bakewell, Matlock, Derby, Buxton, Stockport, and Manchester.	II
Riverside Hotel; 53.22361°N 1.71107°W		Early 19th century	A house, later a hotel, it is in rendered stone with gritstone dressings, a moulded and dentilled cornice, and a stone slate roof with moulded gable copings and kneelers. There are two storeys and an L-shaped plan, with a main range of two bays, and a later rear wing. In the centre is a porch with Doric columns and a dentilled broken pediment, and a doorway with a semicircular traceried fanlight. To the south is a two-storey canted bay window. The other windows on the front are sashes, and in the rear wing are mullioned windows.	II
Gate piers and walls, Riverside Hotel; 53.22363°N 1.71053°W		Early 19th century	The walls at the entrance to the hotel and the gate piers are in limestone, and the walls have gritstone copings. The piers are rusticated and have shallow pyramidal caps.	II
Taxus Hill and walls 53.22645°N 1.70695°W		Early 19th century	A house in limestone with gritstone dressings, quoins, an eaves band, and a stone slate roof with coped gables and kneelers. There are two storeys and three bays, and a lower two-bay extension to the west. The central doorway has a stepped architrave, a plain lintel and a moulded cornice, and the windows are sashes. The attached wall is in limestone with slab gritstone copings.	II
The Candle House; 53.22475°N 1.70696°W		Early 19th century	The house is in limestone on a plinth, with gritstone dressings, quoins, an eaves band, and a stone slate roof with a coped gable and a plain kneeler to the north. There are two storeys and three bays. The central doorway has a bracketed stone hood. The windows are sashes; above the doorway the window has a single light, and the other windows are mullioned with two lights.	II
The Elms; 53.22510°N 1.71092°W		Early 19th century	The house is in limestone with gritstone dressings, quoins, an eaves band, and a stone slate roof with coped gables and plain kneelers. There are two storeys, a double-pile plan, and four bays, the left two bays lower. The doorway has a bracketed moulded stone hood, and the windows are a mix of small-pane sashes and casements, some of which are mullioned. On the garden front is a two-storey canted bay window.	II
The Grange; 53.22628°N 1.70672°W		Early 19th century	The house, probably with an earlier core, is in limestone with gritstone dressings, quoins, an eaves band, and a stone slate roof with coped gables and moulded kneelers. There are two storeys, two bays on the front, and a rear wing. The doorway has a stepped architrave and a moulded cornice. The windows are sashes, and at the rear is a transomed stair window.	II
The Old Forge; 53.22469°N 1.70690°W		Early 19th century	The house is in limestone with gritstone dressings and a stone slate roof. There are two storeys and two bays. In the ground floor, to the right, are two doorways with flush surrounds, the right doorway leading to a passage. The windows are mullioned sashes with two lights.	II
Coach House and stables, The Rookery; 53.22391°N 1.71361°W		Early 19th century (probable)	The coach house and stables, later used for other purposes, are in limestone with gritstone dressings, and have a roof of slate and stone slate. The building is partly in one and partly in two storeys, and has three bays. It contains a large segmental-headed arch, double plank doors, a small window, and two hayloft openings.	II
Churchdale Hall; 53.23022°N 1.69806°W		1831	The house, which was extended in 1840, is in gritstone, with quoins, and roofs of slate and stone slate. There are two storeys and six bays. The left three bays have coped gables with ball finials, the next bay is wider and gabled, and the right end bay is recessed. In the second bay is a porch on four square piers with a moulded cornice. To its left is a canted bay window, and there is a square bay window in the fourth bay. Some windows are mullioned with hood moulds, and others are also transomed.	II
Rose Cottage; 53.22438°N 1.71275°W		c. 1849	The cottage is in gritstone, with limestone at the rear, bracketed wooden eaves gutter, plain bargeboards, and a tile roof with two diamond-set chimneys. There are two storeys and two bays, and a single-storey extension to the west. The central doorway has a chamfered surround, a segmental head, and a hood mould. To the east is a canted bay window, and the other windows are mullioned with hood moulds.	II
Cottage to east of Rose Cottage; 53.22446°N 1.71231°W		c. 1849	The house, which was extended in the 20th century, is in gritstone on the front and limestone elsewhere, and has a stone slate roof with a coped gable and a kneeler on the left. There are two storeys and three bays, and a lower extension to the left. The windows are small-paned, those in the ground floor with hood moulds, and in the extension are casement windows.	II
1 and 2 Greaves Lane; 53.22463°N 1.70680°W		Mid 19th century	A pair of cottages, later combined, possibly with an earlier core, the building is in limestone with gritstone dressings, quoins, a stone slate roof, and a brick gable end. There are two storeys and three bays. On the front are paired doorways, one with voussoirs, and another inserted doorway to the right, and the windows are sashes.	II
Terrace, steps and walls, Ashford Hall; 53.22442°N 1.70182°W	—	Mid 19th century	Along the front of the hall is a full-width terrace 5 feet (1.5 m) high, that has a limestone wall with gritstone copings. At the ends, flights of eight steps lead down to a parterre. The steps are flanked by wall with pierced stone circles and semicircular arcades, and square piers with ball finials.	II
Chantry Cottage; 53.22430°N 1.70864°W		Mid 19th century	A house in limestone with gritstone dressings and a tile roof. There are two storeys and two bays. The central doorway has a flush surround, and the windows are sashes.	II
Clifton House and Brushfield House; 53.22439°N 1.70798°W		Mid 19th century	A pair of similar houses in gritstone, with quoins, and a plain eaves band. Clifton House has a stone slate roof, and the roof of Brushfield House is tiled. There are two storeys, and each house has three bays, a central semicircular doorway with plain jambs, a traceried fanlight, and projecting impost blocks carrying a bracketed hood. The windows are sashes with flush lintels and projecting sills. Clifton House has an additional doorway to the left.	II
Well, Riverside Hotel; 53.22378°N 1.71130°W		19th century	The well is in a niche in a limestone wall to the north of the hotel. The niche is about 5 feet (1.5 m) high, with a semicircular head, voussoirs, and quoins on the sides. In front of the well are plain iron railings.	II
Thornbury; 53.22482°N 1.70704°W		Mid 19th century	A house on a corner site, it is in limestone, with painted dressings, and a stone slate roof, hipped to the south, with a coped gable and a plain kneeler. There are two storeys and a front of three bays. The central doorway has reeded pilasters, moulded imposts, a semicircular traceried fanlight, and a bracketed stone hood. It is flanked by canted bay windows, and in the upper floor are sash windows.	II
The Vicarage; 53.22574°N 1.71008°W		c. 1853	The vicarage is in limestone on a shallow plinth, with gritstone dressings, quoins, and slate roofs with coped gables and moulded kneelers. There are two storeys, a double-depth plan, and two bays. The west front has double gables, a two-storey canted bay window in the south bay, and a three-light mullioned window to the north. Elsewhere, there are trefoil-headed lancet windows, and on the roof is a row of four tall diamond-section chimney stacks.	II
Bridge north of Ashford Bobbin Mill; 53.22396°N 1.72838°W		1870s	The bridge carries a track over the River Wye. It is in limestone with gritstone dressings, and consists of a single segmental arch. The bridge has voussoirs, and a low parapet that splays outwards at the ends.	II
Dovecote and wall, Riverside Hotel; 53.22366°N 1.71077°W		Late 19th century	The dovecote is in limestone and gritstone, with overhanging eaves, and a tile roof. There is a single storey, and it has a circular plan. The dovecote contains a doorway and a window, in the roof are four gabled dormers, and on the top is a wooden octagonal cupola. Attached to the east is a coped wall.	II
Gate piers, gates and railings, Thornbridge Hall; 53.23537°N 1.69314°W		Late 19th century	The gates and railings at the disused east entrance to the hall are in iron. In the centre are two pairs of gates and a pair of openwork iron piers. Flanking the gates are stone piers, and curving walls with railings ending in stone piers. These piers are about 10 feet (3.0 m) high, and have moulded bases and cornices, and formerly had fluted urns.	II
Gates and walls, Thornbridge Hall; 53.23527°N 1.70572°W	—	c. 1897	The gates at the garden entrance to the west of the hall are in wrought iron, and have scroll decoration. The gate piers are in stone, they are square, and are about 10 feet (3.0 m) high. Each pier has a moulded capital, and an urn finial with a fluted base, and a domed top decorated with foliage and satyr heads. The walls are in limestone, and have moulded copings.	II
West Lodge and walls, Thornbridge Hall; 53.23532°N 1.70554°W		c. 1897	The lodge is in limestone with gritstone dressings, quoins, and a tile roof with moulded coped gables, moulded kneelers and ball finials. There is a single storey and an irregular plan. Diagonally on a corner is a doorway with a moulded architrave, above which is a stepped semicircular gable with a pierced finial. To the west is a polygonal bay window, and elsewhere is a two-light mullioned window. Attached to the lodge is a limestone wall with moulded copings, and two sets of gates, one with square piers and urn finials.	II
East Lodge, Thornbridge Hall; 53.23006°N 1.70214°W	—	c. 1900	The lodge is in limestone with gritstone dressings, quoins, and a tile roof with moulded coped gables, moulded kneelers and ball finials. There is a single storey and an irregular plan. Diagonally on a corner is a doorway with a moulded architrave, above which is a stepped semicircular gable with a pierced finial. To the east is a polygonal bay window, and elsewhere is a two-light mullioned window.	II
Garden walls, gates and urns, Thornbridge Hall; 53.23563°N 1.70576°W	—	c. 1903	The gates are in wrought iron, and the other structures are in limestone with gritstone dressings. The gates are flanked by piers with urn finials. In the wall is a gateway with a four-centred arch, moulded jambs, and stepped parapets. To the north is a line of three pairs of urns, each with an elaborate fluted and scrolled base, the sides decorated with scenes, and at the top is a lid with a flame finial.	II
Wyedale House, Thornbridge Hall; 53.23588°N 1.70774°W	—	c. 1903	The cottage, which was extended in the 1930s, is in limestone with gritstone dressings, quoins, a continuous hood mould, and a tile roof. There is a single storey, a circular plan, and an extension to the north. The cottage contains a doorway with a quoined surround and three-light mullioned windows, and in the roof are three gabled dormers. The extension contains mullioned windows, and at the end is a round embattled section.	II
Woodlands, Thornbridge Hall; 53.23636°N 1.70595°W		c. 1903–04	Originally an entrance lodge to the hall from the railway station with waiting rooms, it was later converted for residential use. It is limestone with gritstone dressings, quoins, string courses, and a tile roof with moulded coped gables. The lodge has a main block of two storeys and four bays, lower flanking two-bay wings, and a U-shaped plan. In the main block is a four-centred archway flanked by octagonal four-storey embattled towers. Above the arch is a coat of arms, a two-light mullioned window, and a parapet with round-headed merlons. The outer bays contain mullioned and transomed windows and have embattled parapets. Each of the wings has two dormers, one with a Dutch gable, and a projecting bay with a two-storey canted bay window.	II
1, 2 and 3 Hall End Lane; 53.22498°N 1.70699°W		Undated	A row of three cottages, later combined, in limestone with painted stone dressings, a brick gable end, and a tile roof with a stone ridge. There are three storeys and three bays. In each bay is a doorway, a two-light mullioned casement window in each of the lower two floors, and a single-light casement window in the top floor.	II
Gardens, Thornbridge Hall; 53.23508°N 1.70379°W		Undated	To the south of the house are upper and lower gardens, and to the east are a rose garden, terraces, and a sunken topiary garden. The listed buildings in the gardens include walls, steps, terraces, a game larder, a garden house, and a grotto passage with ornaments.	II
