= Seven Wonders of the Peak =

Historical attractions of the Derbyshire Peak District

The Seven Wonders of the Peak were described in the 17th century by the philosopher Thomas Hobbes in his book De Mirabilibus Pecci: Being The Wonders of the Peak in Darby-shire, Commonly called The Devil's Arse of Peak. The wonders refer to places to visit in the Peak District of Derbyshire in England.

Thomas Hobbes worked for the Earls of Devonshire at Chatsworth House, as tutor and secretary. After touring the High Peak in 1626, Hobbes published his 84-page Latin poem De Mirabilibus Pecci in 1636. It was published with an English translation in 1676. He recounted:

"Of the High Peak are seven wonders writ. Two fonts, two caves. One pallace, mount and pit."

These wonders are:

Wonder	Name	Location	Hobbes' verse	Description
	St Ann's Well	Buxton	"The Sun burnt clouds but glimmer to the fight, when at famed Buxton’s hot bath we alight unto St. Ann the Fountain sacred is: With waters hot and cold its sources rise, And in its Sulphur-veins there’s medicine lies. This cures the palsied members of the old, and cherishes the nerves grown stiff and cold"	The natural warm waters of Buxton have been revered since Roman times. By the 1520s the spring was dedicated to St Anne and the curative powers of the waters from the well were reported. A 16th-century act of parliament ruled that a free supply of the spring water must be provided for the town's residents. The current stone water fountain with its brass lion's head spout was built in 1940, replacing its predecessors from 1895, 1783 and earlier. St Ann's well is next to the Pump Room, built in 1894 to dispense the well water for drinking (the building is now the Tourist Information centre). The geothermal spring rises from about 1km below ground and about a million litres of water flow out per day. The mineral water emerges at a steady 27°C. Analysis of the water has indicated that it has a high magnesium content and that it originated around 5,000 years ago. The same spring water is bottled and sold as Buxton Mineral Water.
	The Ebbing and Flowing Well	Tideswell	"A thousand paces off, a fount doth rise. From the low caverns of a grassie hill; With double mouth its waters gushing still. Which since the admir'd flux of the greater sea Doth by report in its small channel play"	Thomas Hobbes and Charles Cotton wrote about how this spring would ‘swell and boil up’ and become ‘a little torrent’. However the tidal phenomenon of the ebbing and flowing of this natural siphon stopped after 1790. The well is now largely forgotten and inconspicuous in the front garden of a private house.
	Poole's Cavern	Buxton	"One thing remained, but highly worth our view, Pool's hole, a cave so called and near us too. Pool was a famous thief, and as we're told Equal to Cacus, and perchance as old. Shrowded within this darksome hid retrieve By spoils of those he robbed, he used to live"	This natural limestone cavern is two million years old, formed by underground water dissolving the rock. It has several large chambers (Roman Chamber, Great Dome, Poached Egg Chamber and Sculpture Chamber) with numerous stalactites and stalagmites. Stone Age, Bronze Age and Roman artefacts have been discovered inside. As Hobbes points out, the cavern is named after a medieval outlaw named Poole who used it as a hiding place. A branch of the River Wye flows through the cave system. The cavern is open to the public with tours along its 300m main passage. The temperature is a constant 7°C. Poole's Cavern is part of a designated Site of Special Scientific Interest (SSSI).
	The Devil's Arse (Peak Cavern)	Castleton	"A noble Cave between two rocks appears, Unto the sun unknown, but to the stars Fearing to be immerged, and both the bears Turned, it its mouth with horrour does present: Just like a furnace, or as Hell they paint, Swallowing with open jawes the damned croud After the sentence is pronounced aloud."	This natural limestone cavern is one of four show caves (open to public visitors) in Castleton. It is situated in a deep gorge below Peveril Castle. The entrance chamber contains the remains of a past settlement where the inhabitants made ropes for the local lead mines for over 400 years.The Great Cave and Roger Rain's House are the two main chambers. The underground stream inside is known as "The Styx" after the mythical River Styx leading to the Underworld of Hades. The cavern has been used as a concert venue by Jarvis Cocker, Richard Hawley and The Vaccines.
	Chatsworth House	Chatsworth near Bakewell	"On the English Alps, where Darbies Peak doth rise, High up in hills, that emulate the skies, And largely waters all the vales below, With rivers that still plentifully flow, Doth Chatsworth by swift Derwins Channel stand"	The stately home is the residence of the Duke of Devonshire and has been the Cavendish family's home since 1549. The house was built by Bess of Hardwick (wife of William Cavendish) between 1553 and the 1560s and is a Grade I listed building. The estate on the banks of the River Derwent covers nearly 2,000 acres of gardens, landscaped parkland and woodland. In the 1700s Lancelot "Capability" Brown designed the estate's landscape. In the 1800s Joseph Paxton was the head gardener. The house and park are open to public and attract about 300,000 visitors a year. The house contains major collections of paintings, furniture and sculptures.
	Mam Tor	Castleton	"Until the mountains top and that be one. And though the most called Mam Tor, nevertheless Maimed for the cliff I rather should express. Which does in English a torn rock denote, And the decrepit hill gives favour to't."	The hill at the end of Rushup Edge is over 500m high with clear views up the Hope Valley and across to Kinder Scout. Its name means Mother Hill. The hill is owned and managed by the National Trust. The south east face is subject to continual landslides and the unstable A625 road across it was permanently closed after 1979 (so that all traffic now goes through Winnats Pass). The updraft winds created by the steep face make the hill a popular location for paragliders. The Bronze Age hillfort and burial mounds are a protected Scheduled Monument.
	Eldon Hole	Eldon Hill near Castleton	"This laid the stone We drop, which circled in thick mist is thrown. Against a rock, the cavern groans the while, Loud sighs are vented from the shaken pile. From rock to rock, the sound goes downward still, Less heard by us but the more heard by Hell."	This chasm is 245 feet (75 m) deep, making it the deepest pothole in Derbyshire. The entrance at the surface is 115 feet (35 m) long by 20 feet (6.1 m) wide. At the bottom is a cavern with a dome-shaped roof and stalactites. According to folklore the devil lived inside it.

Mary Queen of Scots is known to have visited three of the wonders. By command of Queen Elizabeth I, she was held prisoner at Chatsworth House several times between 1569 and 1584 (her rooms are still called the Queen of Scots Apartments). Mary was granted permission by the Queen to ‘take the cure’ for her rheumatism at St Ann's Well in Buxton. She visited the well, under guard and for up to a month at a time, most years from 1573 to 1584. In 1582 Mary is also supposed to have visited Poole's Cavern in Buxton. Before leaving in 1584, she etched in Latin on the window of her room at the Buxton Old Hall:

"Buxton, whose fame thy milk-waters tell, Whom I, perhaps, no more shall see, farewell."

Long before Hobbes wrote his poem, the Elizabethan antiquarian William Camden had written of three wonders and three beauties of the High Peak, in his definitive reference book Britannia, first published in 1586. It was written in Latin and later translated into English. He describes:

"There are in High Peake wonders three,
A deepe hole, Cave, and Den,
Commodities as many bee,
Led, Grasse, and Sheepe in pen.
And Beauties three there are withall,
A Castle, Bath, Chatsworth.
With places more yet meet you shall
That are of meaner worth."

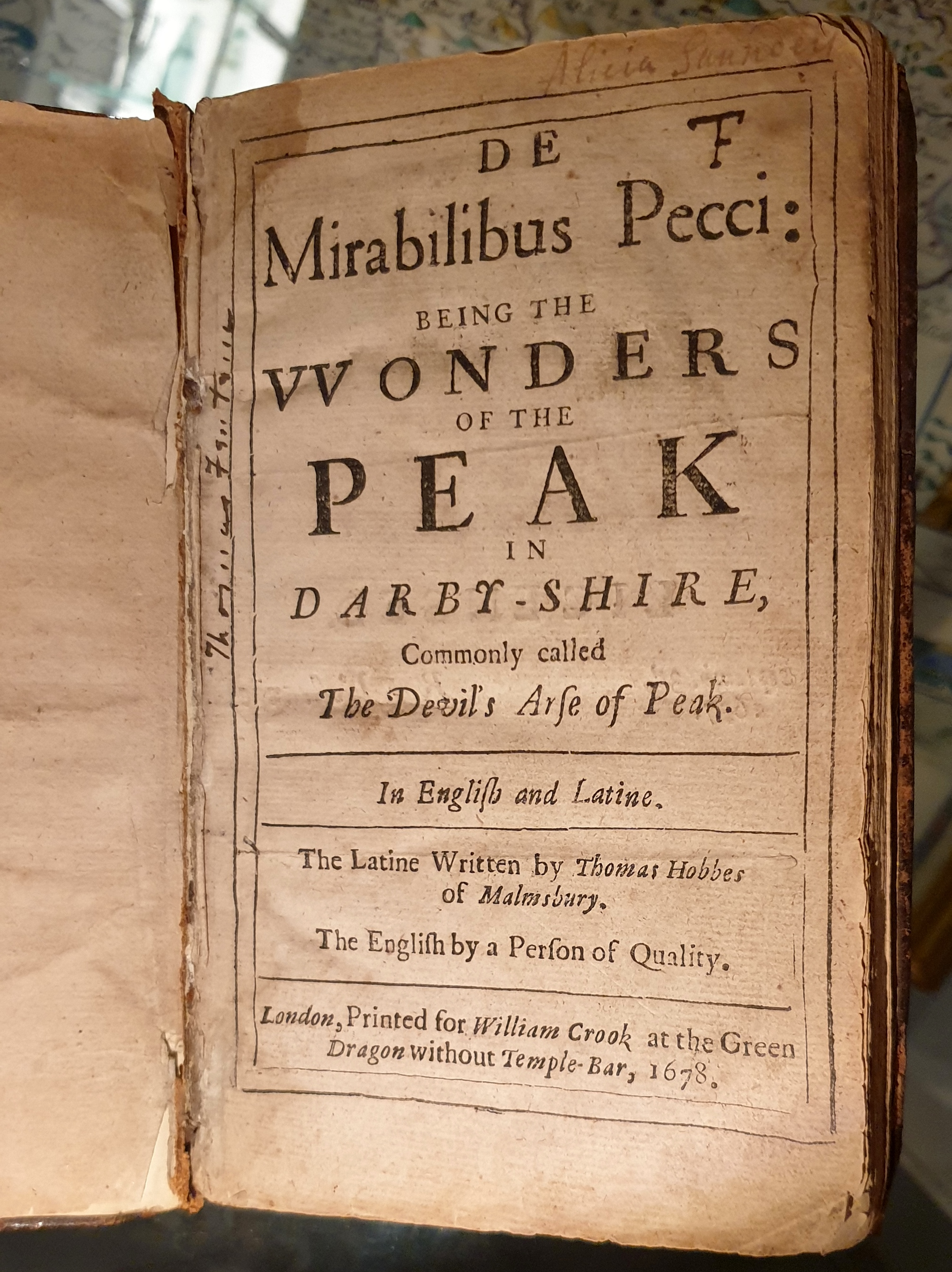
The Wonders of the Peak by Thomas Hobbes

Hobbes' list of attractions became a popular tourist itinerary for the aristocracy (and with the middle classes too by the 1700s), among them Celia Fiennes. The same wonders were further popularised by poet Charles Cotton (squire of Beresford Hall in Dovedale). In 1681 he wrote his 86 page long poetic essay The Wonders of the Peake. In the 1720s satirist author Daniel Defoe published his Tour thro’ the Whole Island of Great Britain, in which he denounced Hobbes’ and Cotton’s ‘Wonders of the Peak', declaring that only Eldon Hole and Chatsworth were justified.

The Buxton Museum has a 'Wonders of the Peak' exhibit and online collection, including an original edition of Thomas Hobbes' book De Mirabilibus Pecci.
