= Wye Head =

Coordinates: 53.255°N 1.928°W

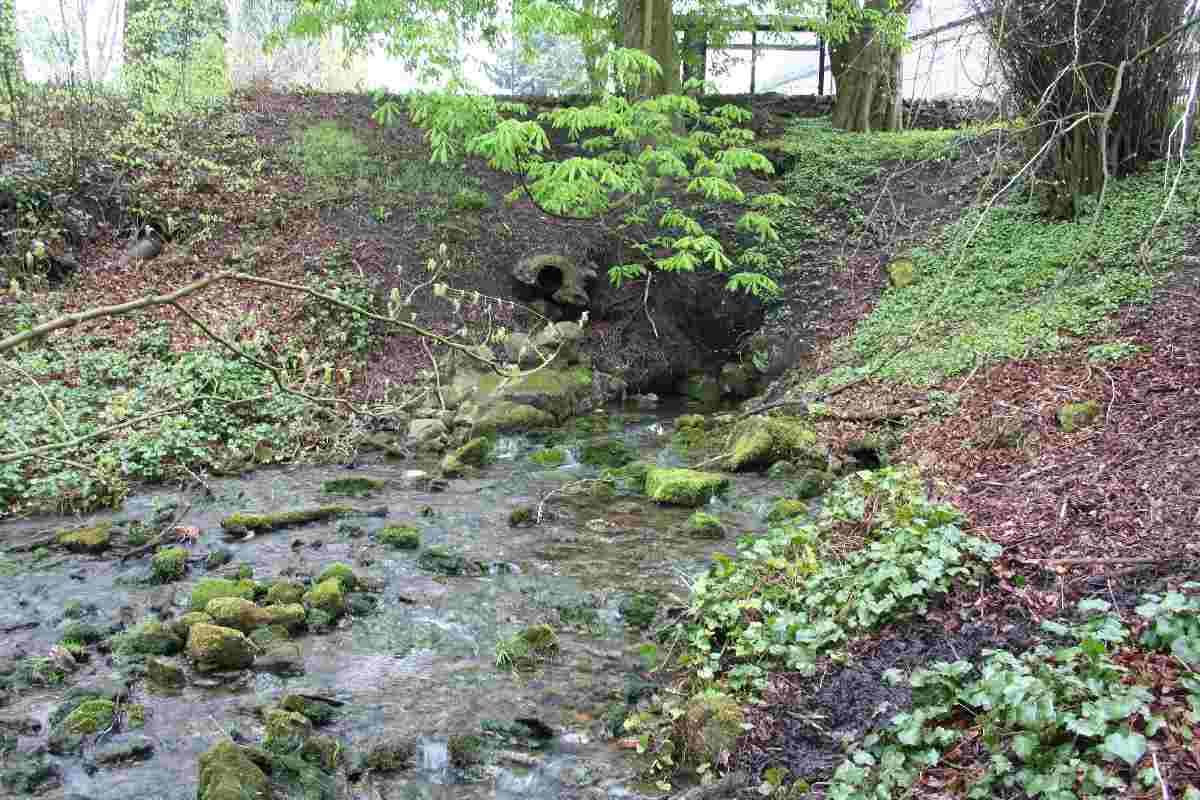
- Wye Head rising

- Location within Derbyshire
- OS grid reference: SK049731
- District: High Peak
- Shire county: Derbyshire
- Region: East Midlands
- Country: England
- Sovereign state: United Kingdom
- Post town: BUXTON
- Postcode district: DE56
- Police: Derbyshire
- Fire: Derbyshire
- Ambulance: East Midlands

Wye Head is an area in Derbyshire, England. It is in the civil parish of Burbage, on the outskirts of Buxton. It is so named because of a major rising of the River Wye, which carries much of the water from Poole's Cavern.
