= Eldon Hill =

Hill in United Kingdom

Coordinates: 53.32670°N 1.82880°W

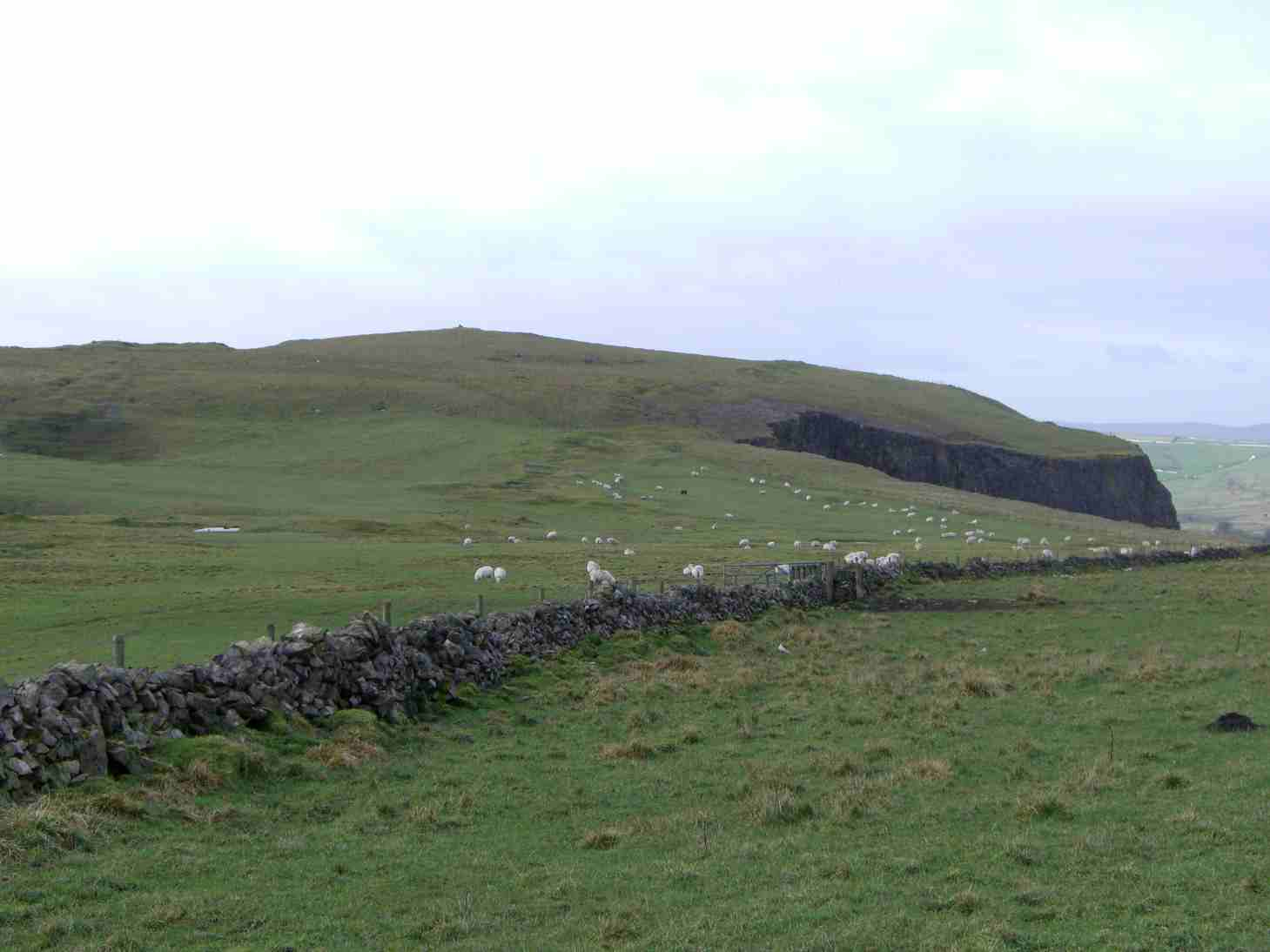
- Eldon Hill from the bridleway to the north. The start of the quarry workings can be seen on the right.

Highest point
- Elevation: 470 m (1,540 ft)
- Prominence: c. 70 m
- Listing: None

Naming
- English translation: "Elves Hill"
- Language of name: Old English

Geography
- Location: Derbyshire, England
- Parent range: Peak District, White Peak
- OS grid: SK115811
- Topo map: OS Landranger 110, 119 OS Explorer OL1

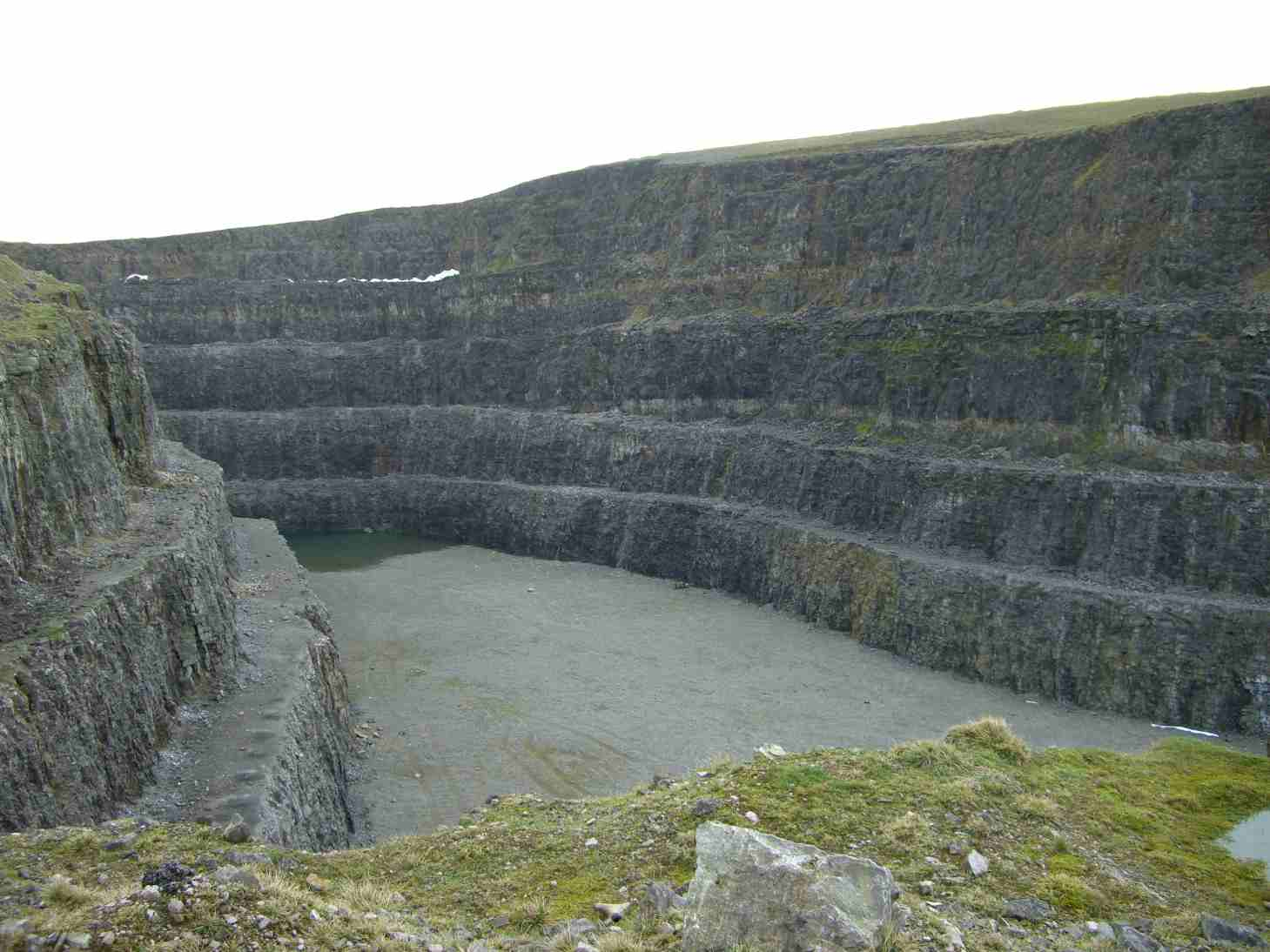
Part of the quarry workings on the north west side of Eldon Hill

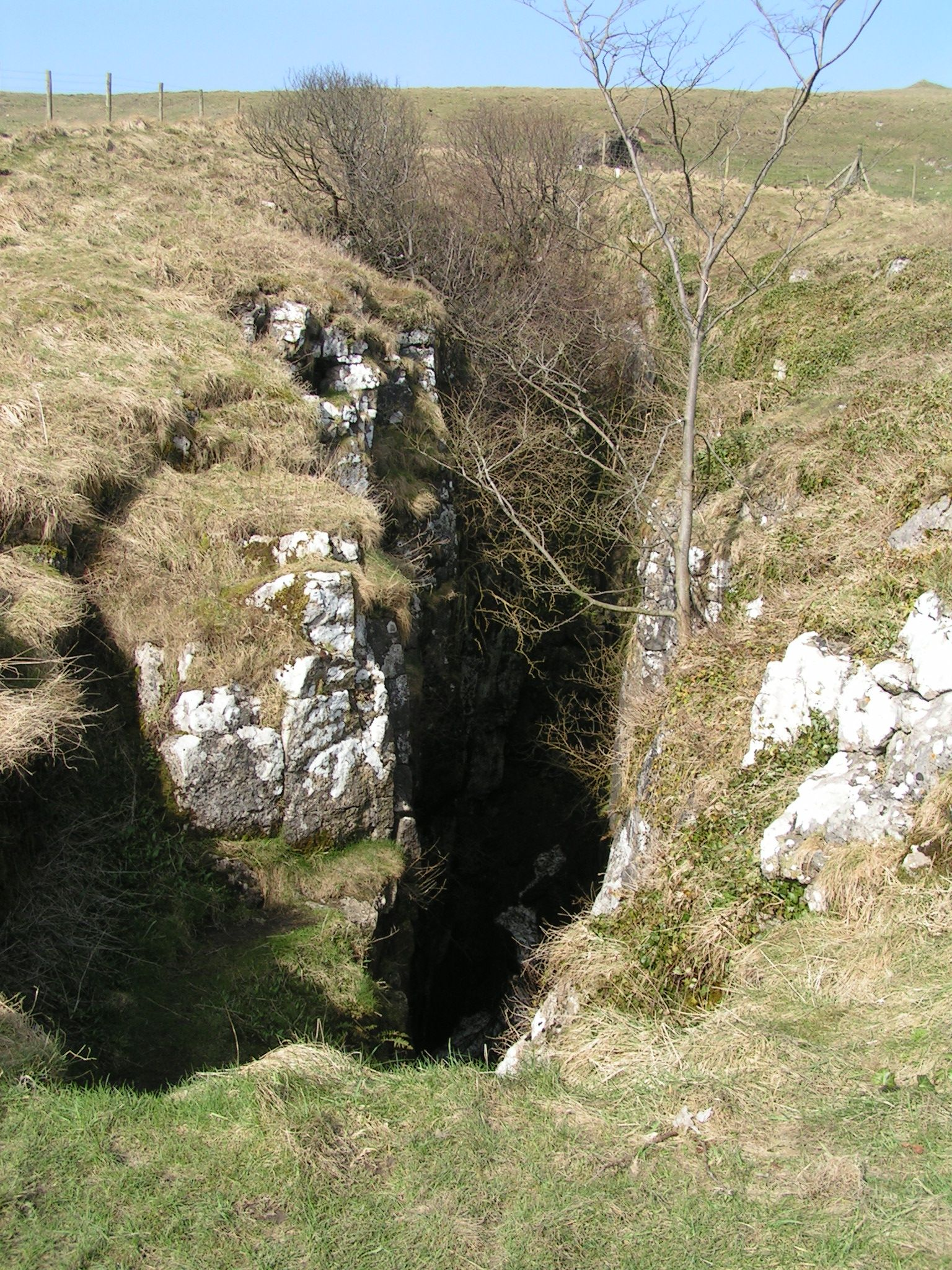
Eldon Hole

Eldon Hill is a hill in the Peak District National Park in the county of Derbyshire, England, 4 kilometres (2.5 mi) southwest of the village of Castleton. It is a 470-metre (1,540 ft) limestone hill whose pastureland is used for rough grazing, although a large proportion has been lost to limestone quarrying. It lies within the Castleton Site of Special Scientific Interest. Eldon Hill was formed when a bed of pure limestone was squeezed and upfolded by geological forces to form a dome; it is the highest limestone hill north of the River Wye.

The hill is of considerable geological, historical and industrial interest; it lies at the northern limit of the carboniferous limestone in the Peak District, as further north it merges into the millstone grit of the Dark Peak. The name Elveden is first attested in 1285 as Elvedon and seems to have meant 'Elves' hill'.

Quarrying permission was granted in 1950 and huge quantities of limestone have been excavated, mostly for road-building purposes. A large amount of the northern and northwestern slopes of the hill have disappeared and it has been called the best-known eyesore in the Peak District. In 1995 an application by RMC Aggregates to extend the quarrying further east was denied as parliament tightened up on environmental problems caused by old mineral permissions granted between 1948 and 1981. The quarry closed in 1999 and now stands unused with vegetation starting to grow on the quarry face. There have been some attempts at natural restoration with several aquatic pools being established in the former workings. The termination of quarrying has also given cavers the chance to explore some of the narrow caves exposed by the work, with Sidetrack Cave (discovered 2002) being one of the most impressive. In September 2020 the quarry was used as a film location for a TV series called Ray James, inspired by H. G. Wells' The War of the Worlds.

350 metres south of the summit lies Eldon Hole. At 55 metres it is the deepest pothole in the area and was named as one of the Seven Wonders of the Peak by the philosopher Thomas Hobbes in 1636. According to folk tradition, it is the abode of the Devil. Close to the summit of the hill lies a Bronze Age tumulus, a large burial site measuring 16 by 15 metres and 1.5 metres high. The tumulus, a Scheduled Monument, has been excavated on several occasions with human skeletons and jewellery amongst the finds. The hill is dotted with numerous lead mines, all disused and many capped off for safety.

Eldon Hill can be climbed either from the villages of Peak Forest to the south or Castleton to the north. The approach from Castleton goes up Cave Dale with a return down Winnats Pass to give a very interesting walk. The approach from Peak Forest is shorter and passes Eldon Hole on the way. The summit of the hill stands just 100 metres from the edge of the fenced quarry workings and gives good views with Mam Tor, Axe Edge Moor and the town of Buxton all well seen.
