= Listed buildings in Sheldon, Derbyshire =

Sheldon is a civil parish in the Derbyshire Dales district of Derbyshire, England. The parish contains five listed buildings that are recorded in the National Heritage List for England. All the listed buildings are designated at Grade II, the lowest of the three grades, which is applied to "buildings of national importance and special interest". The parish contains the village of Sheldon and the surrounding countryside. The listed buildings consist of a cottage with attached outbuildings, a house, a church, and two buildings associated with a bobbin mill.

== Buildings ==
Name and location	Photograph	Date	Notes
Hope Cottage and outbuildings 53.21585°N 1.74074°W		Late 18th century	The cottage and attached outbuildings are in limestone with gritstone dressings, a slate roof, and two storeys. The cottage has three bays, a doorway with a bracketed hood, and two-light mullioned windows. To the west is an outbuilding, and beyond is a further outbuilding converted into a house, with three bays and sash windows.
Holme Deene; 53.21541°N 1.73819°W	—	Early 19th century	A pair of cottages combined into one house, it is in rendered stone with painted stone dressings, and has a stone slate roof with stone coped gables and moulded kneelers. There are two storeys, two doorways, and mullioned windows with Gothic tracery and two casements.
St Michael and All Angels' Church; 53.21676°N 1.73846°W		1864	The church is in limestone with gritstone dressings, and a steep slate roof. It has a single cell with an apsidal east end, and a south porch. On the west gable is a bellcote, and the windows are lancets. The porch is gabled with moulded copings, and it contains a doorway with a pointed head and a chamfered surround.
East Building, Ashford Bobbin Mill; 53.22352°N 1.72851°W		c. 1870	The former bobbin mill is in limestone with gritstone dressings, and a slate roof with overhanging eaves. There are two storeys and two bays. It contains doorways and a mullioned window, and on the east side are external steps leading up to a doorway.
West Building, Ashford Bobbin Mill; 53.22360°N 1.72889°W		c. 1870	The former bobbin mill is in limestone with gritstone dressings, quoins, and a slate roof with overhanging eaves and wooden ridge finials. There are two storeys and three bays. It contains a doorway and windows, one mullioned, and there is a metal waterwheel on both sides.
