= St Michael and All Angels' Church, Sheldon =

St Michael and All Angels’ Church, Sheldon
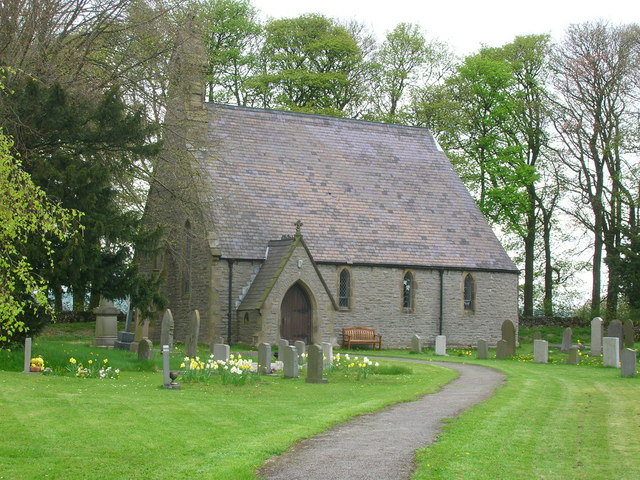
- St Michael and All Angels’ Church, Sheldon
- St Michael and All Angels’ Church, Sheldon
- 53°12′57.49″N 1°44′16.41″W
- OS grid reference: SK 17563 68884
- Location: Sheldon, Derbyshire
- Country: England
- Denomination: Church of England

History
- Dedication: St Michael and All Angels
- Consecrated: 7 October 1864

Architecture
- Heritage designation: Grade II listed
- Designated: 27 July 1984
- Architect: Samuel Rollinson
- Groundbreaking: 31 May 1864
- Completed: 7 October 1864

Administration
- Province: Canterbury
- Diocese: Derby
- Archdeaconry: Chesterfield
- Deanery: Bakewell & Eyam
- Parish: Sheldon

St Michael and All Angels’ Church, Sheldon is a Grade II listed parish church in the Church of England in Sheldon, Derbyshire.

== History ==
The original church was said to have had the largest churchyard in England, inasmuch as the church stood on the highway and was unenclosed. By 1864 the old church was in such a dilapidated state that it was unsafe to enter.

The new church was designed by the architect Samuel Rollinson of Chesterfield. The foundation stone was laid by Rev. H.K. Cornish, vicar of Bakewell, on 31 May 1864 and built by Mr. Gyte of Ashford. It was consecrated on 7 October 1864 by the Bishop of Lichfield.

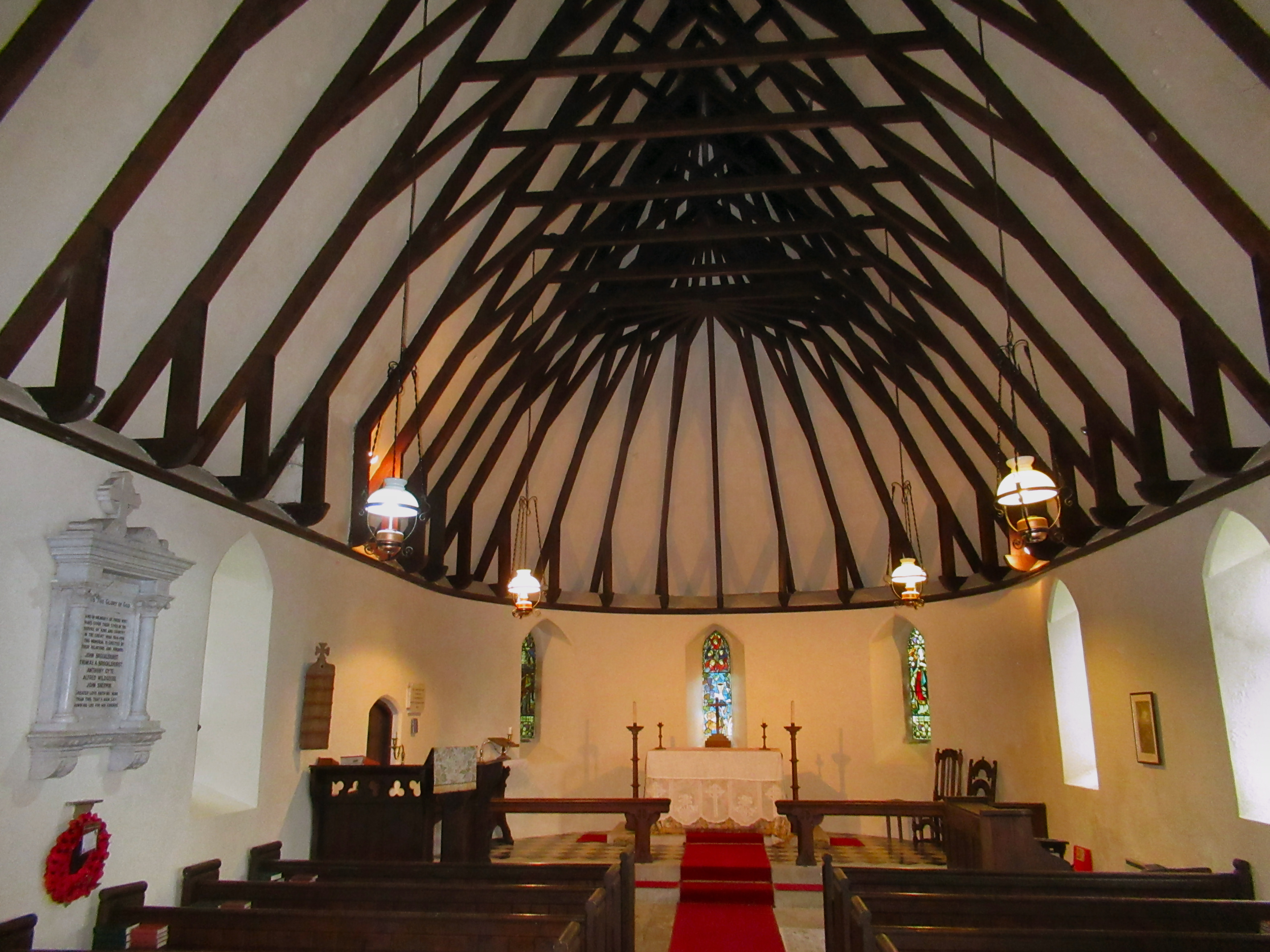
Interior

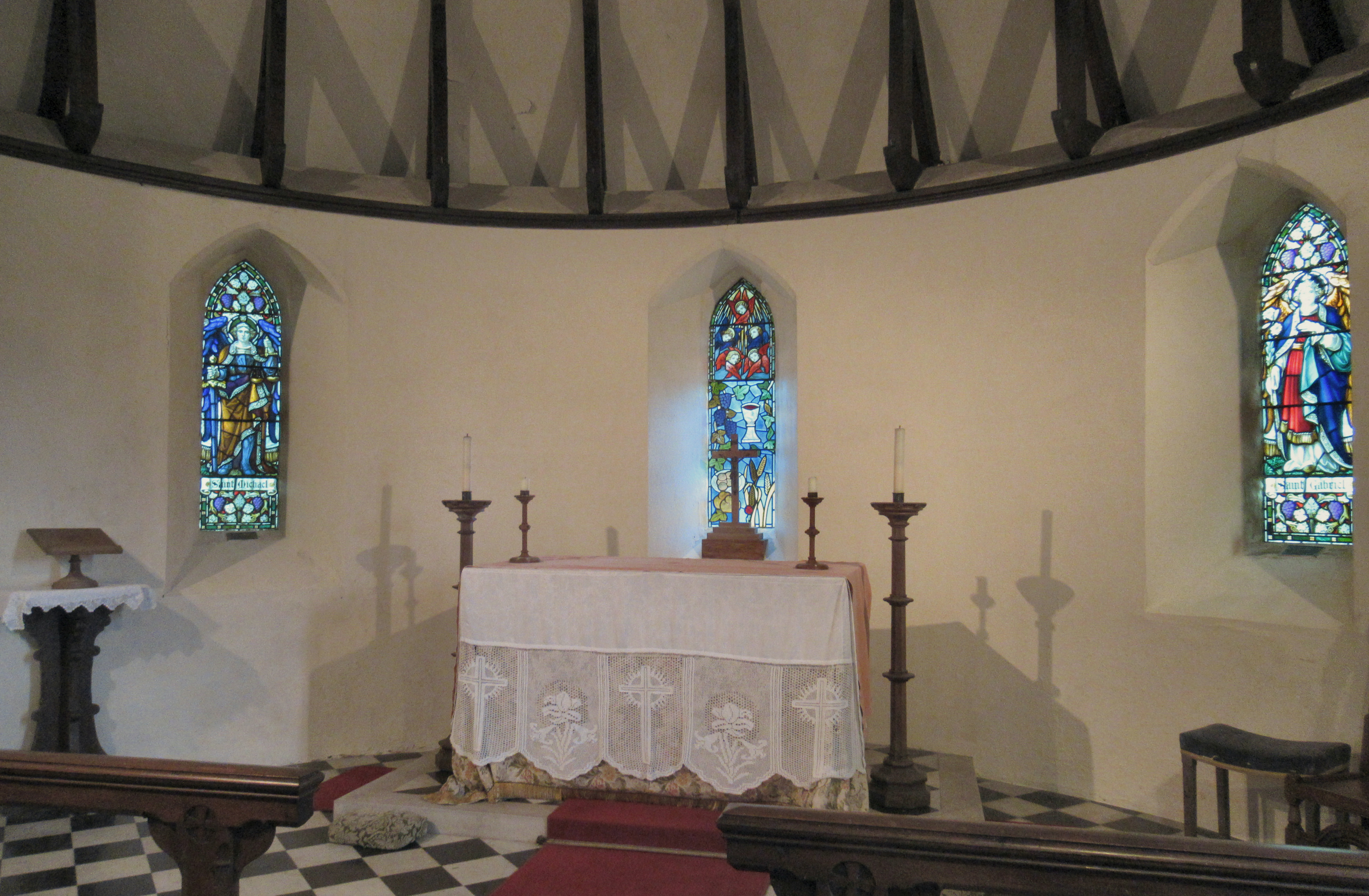
altar

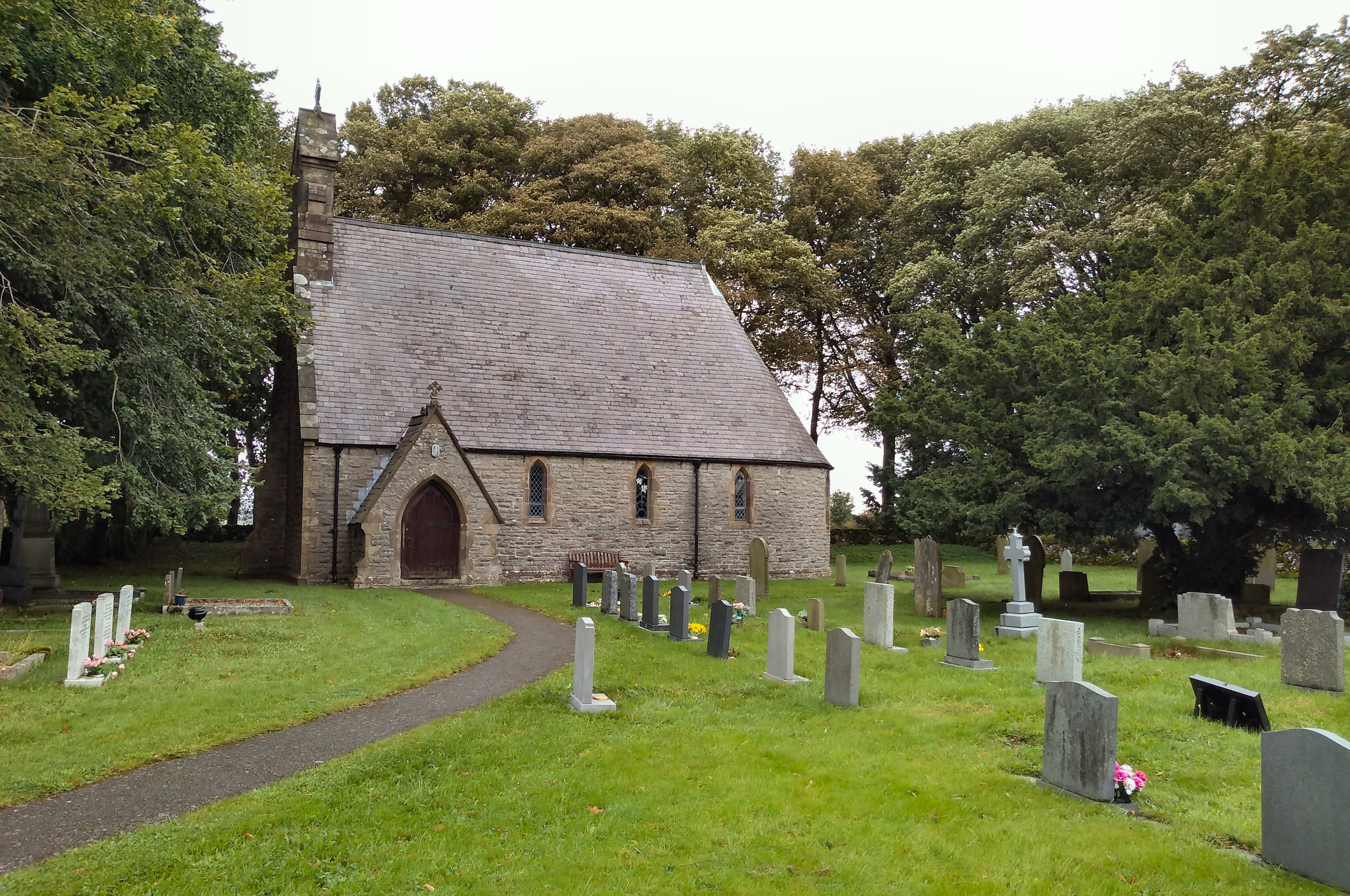
St Michael and All Angels' Church

== Parish status ==
The church is in a joint parish with:

- All Saints’ Church, Bakewell
- Holy Trinity Church, Ashford-in-the-Water
- St Anne's Church, Over Haddon
- St Katherine's Church, Rowsley

== See also ==
- Listed buildings in Sheldon, Derbyshire
