= Ashford-in-the-Water =

Village and civil parish in Derbyshire, England

Coordinates: 53.224°N 1.709°W

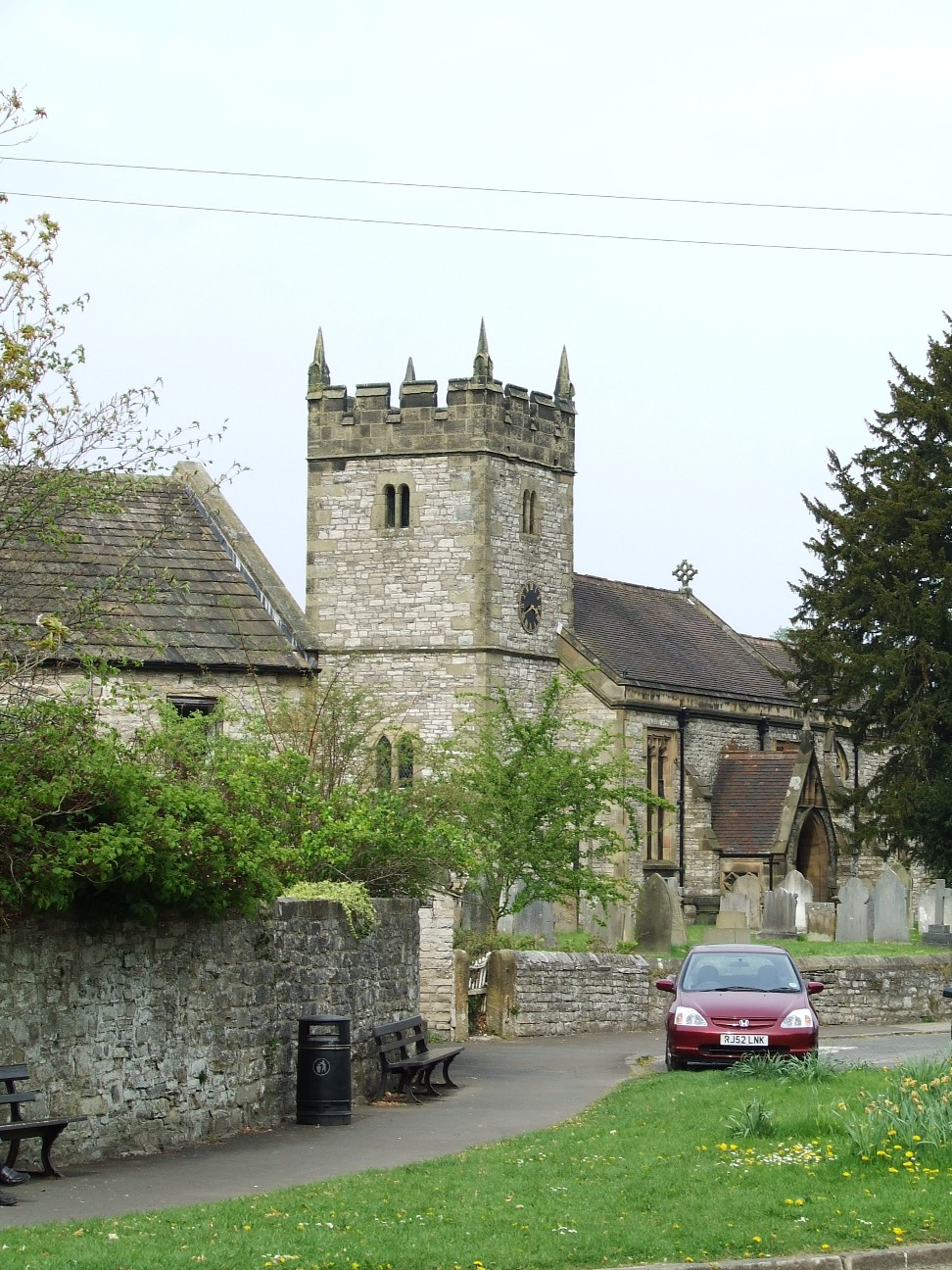
- The parish church of the Holy Trinity

- Location within Derbyshire
- Population: 559 (2011)
- OS grid reference: SK194697
- District: Derbyshire Dales
- Shire county: Derbyshire
- Region: East Midlands
- Country: England
- Sovereign state: United Kingdom
- Post town: BAKEWELL
- Postcode district: DE45
- Police: Derbyshire
- Fire: Derbyshire
- Ambulance: East Midlands
- UK Parliament: Derbyshire Dales

Ashford-in-the-Water is a village and civil parish in the Derbyshire Peak District, England. The village is on the River Wye, 2 miles (3 km) north-west of Bakewell. It is known for the quarrying of Ashford Black Marble (a form of limestone), and for the maidens' garlands made to mark the deaths of virgins in the village until 1801. Some of these are preserved in the parish church. The civil parish population (including Sheldon) taken at the 2011 Census was 559.

== History ==
The name Ashford derives from the Old English æsc and ford, and means a ford where ash trees grow. In 926, the village was known as Æscforda and in the Domesday Book of 1086 it was Aisseford. The addition of "in-the-Water" occurred in the late 17th century, and reflected the proximity of the village to meanders of the River Wye.

In the Domesday Book, Ashford was described as one of the locations in the area where lead was refined.

In 1786, Ashford had mills for carving and polishing the local black marble. By 1848, it had 950 inhabitants.

The village passed to the Cavendish family in the 16th century (from the Nevilles) and was finally sold off in the 1950s to pay death duties.

== Culture ==
The tradition of well-dressing continues in Ashford as in many other villages in the Peak District. Each year slabs of clay are decorated by village volunteers using petals, leaves and other plants to create a picture. The finished designs are then displayed at the six wells around the village and the event is marked by a church service and procession through the village to bless the wells. The event takes place around Trinity Sunday.

== Transport ==
The village is bypassed by the A6 road.

== Notable buildings ==
Within Ashford's civil parish are 62 structures that are listed by Historic England for their historic or architectural interest. None are listed as Grade I, but there are two structures (Ashford Hall and Sheepwash Bridge) that are Grade II*. All the others, including Thornbridge Hall and the parish church, are Grade II.

Ashford Hall dates from 1785, though alterations were made in about 1840. It is a five-bay, three-storey building of gritstone and ashlar, with a balustered parapet around its slate roof. It has an early-19th-century conservatory.

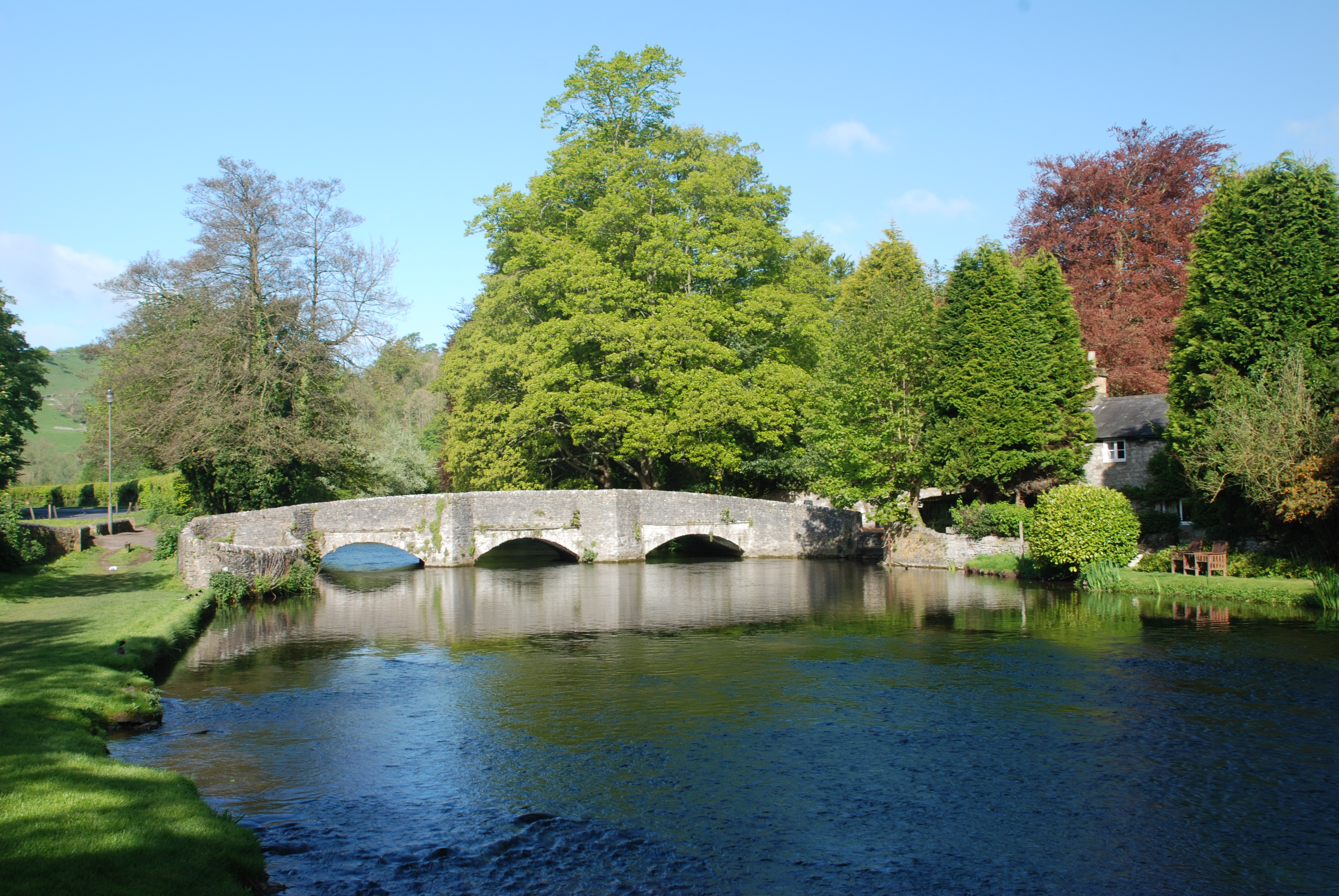
Sheepwash Bridge

The Sheepwash Bridge, which dates from the 17th century, is a packhorse bridge with an attached stone sheepwash: lambs were placed in the pen on one side of the river and the ewes swam across the river to get to them, while being pushed underwater by the shepherds to clean the fleece before shearing. Large trout inhabit the waters of the Wye around the bridge. It is a Scheduled Monument as well as a listed building.

Ashford's parish church of the Holy Trinity was mostly rebuilt in 1868–70 but has a partly 13th-century tower, a 14th-century north arcade and a recovered Norman tympanum above the south doorway. In the churchyard lies the base and stump of a Grade-II-listed churchyard cross, variously dated to the 14th or 15th century. Behind the church are traces of a moat, all that remains of a fortified house which was the home of Edmund Plantagenet, brother of Edward II.

Thornbridge Hall dates from the 18th century, but was enlarged in 1871 and radically altered in a neo-Tudor style in 1897.

Within the parish, but nearer Sheldon village, is Magpie Mine, a disused but well-preserved Derbyshire lead mine complex.

== Demography ==
In the 2011 census, Ashford-in-the-Water was 99.5% White, and 0.2% Asian.

== Notable people ==
Robert Armitage Sterndale, naturalist, artist, writer and statesman who worked in India before becoming Governor-general of St. Helena, was born in the village.

== See also ==
- Listed buildings in Ashford-in-the-Water
