= Holy Trinity Church, Ashford-in-the-Water =

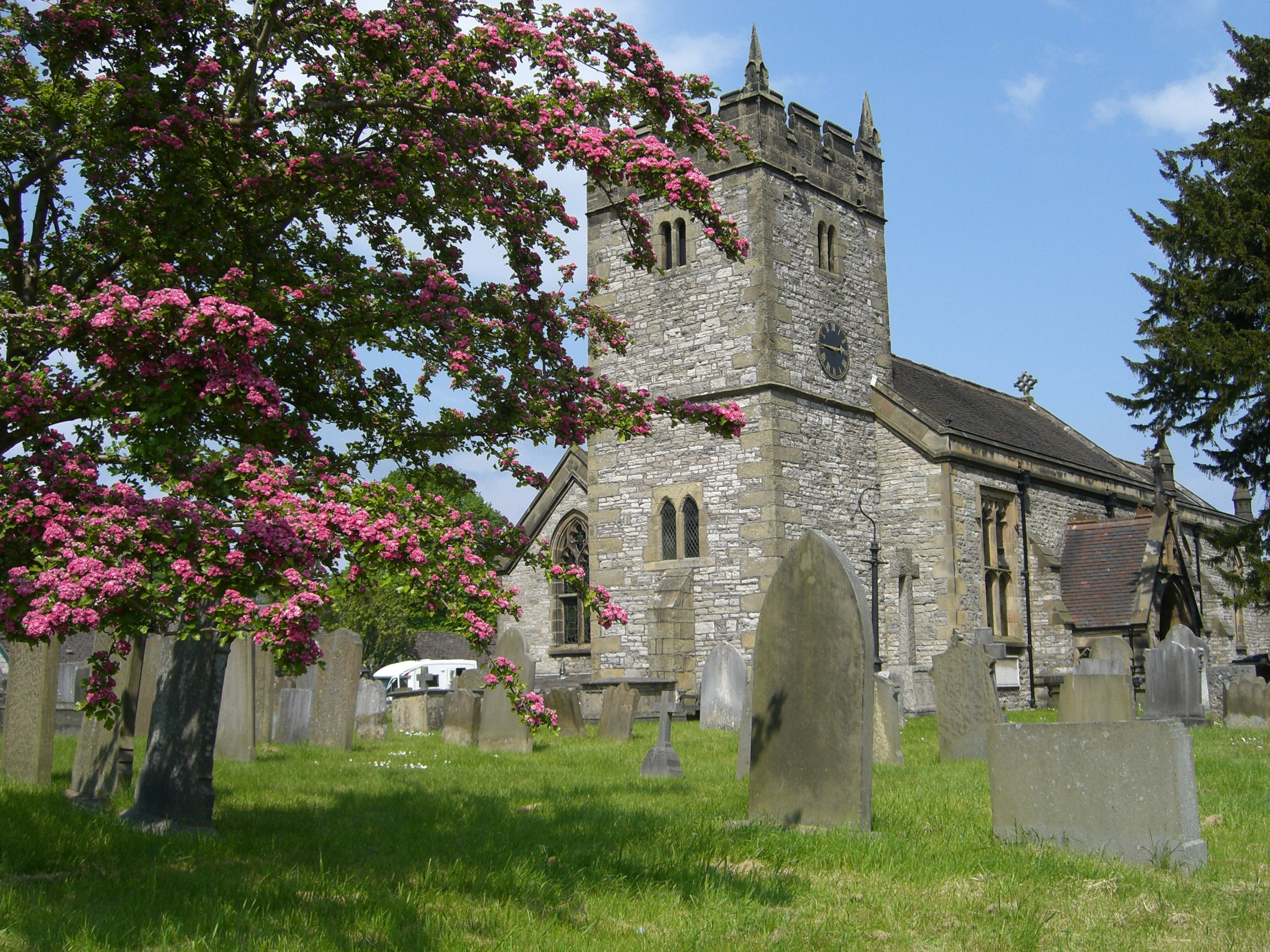
- Holy Trinity Church, Ashford-in-the-Water
- Holy Trinity Church, Ashford-in-the-Water
- 53°13′25.93″N 1°42′35.27″W
- OS grid reference: SK 19504 69722
- Location: Ashford-in-the-Water, Derbyshire
- Country: England
- Denomination: Church of England

History
- Dedication: Holy Trinity

Architecture
- Heritage designation: Grade II listed
- Designated: 12 July 1967
- Completed: 1870

Administration
- Province: Canterbury
- Diocese: Derby
- Archdeaconry: Chesterfield
- Deanery: Bakewell & Eyam
- Parish: Ashford in the Water

Holy Trinity Church, Ashford-in-the-Water is a Grade II listed parish church in the Church of England in Ashford-in-the-Water, Derbyshire.

== History ==
The Church dates from the 12th century. While some 13th-century parts remain – notably the south door with its original Norman decorative stone arch tympanum featuring carvings of a wild boar and other creatures, and also parts of the west tower – the church underwent extensive remodelling, including restoring the tympanum to its rightful place, between 1868 and 1870 by J.M. and H. Taylor, and was reopened on 24 June 1870 by the Bishop of Lichfield.

== Parish status ==
The church is in a joint parish with:

- All Saints' Church, Bakewell
- St Anne's Church, Over Haddon
- St Katherine's Church, Rowsley
- St Michael and All Angels' Church, Sheldon

== Organ ==
A new organ was installed in 1928 by J Housley Adkins. A specification of the organ can be found on the National Pipe Organ Register.

== Bells ==
The church tower contains a ring of 6 bells, 4 cast in 1954, and 2 in 1966 by John Taylor of Loughborough. There is also a Sanctus bell dating from 1699, also known as locals as the 'Pancake Bell'.

== Stained glass ==
The church contains a mixture of Victorian and more modern stained glass.

The East window depicts the Crucifixion and is by Heaton, Butler and Bayne (1875).

The Cottingham Window (1880) has The Annunciation, designed by William Morris, and below St John by Edward Burne-Jones, originally for the Savoy Chapel (1869). The chalice and the dragon refer to the story that the priest of the temple of Diana at Ephesus gave John a poison cup to drink to test his faith. When he blessed the cup a dragon came out of it, symbolising poison, later used to represent faith and Satan. The Dove in the tracery is designed by Philip Webb.

In the south wall by the pulpit the Haworth window (1880) is by Clayton and Bell. It shows the six Works of Mercy included in the Parable of the Sheep and the Goats in St Matthew’s gospel.

On the north wall the windows are modern.

The window of St. Nicholas, Patron Saint of children, was installed in 1953 and designed by Gerald Edward Roberts Smith (1883-1959), head of the Archibald Keightley Nicholson studio, in memory of Alice Tinsley.

The window of Our Lady with the Infant Christ was installed in 1960, designed by Francis Skeat. It commemorates Lieutenant-colonel William Herbert Olivier, Sheriff of Derbyshire.

The Olivier Window was installed in 2001 and also commemorates William Herbert Olivier. It is by Flore Vignet.

== See also ==
- Listed buildings in Ashford-in-the-Water
