= Sheldon, Derbyshire =

Village and civil parish in Derbyshire, England

Coordinates: 53.215°N 1.741°W

Sheldon
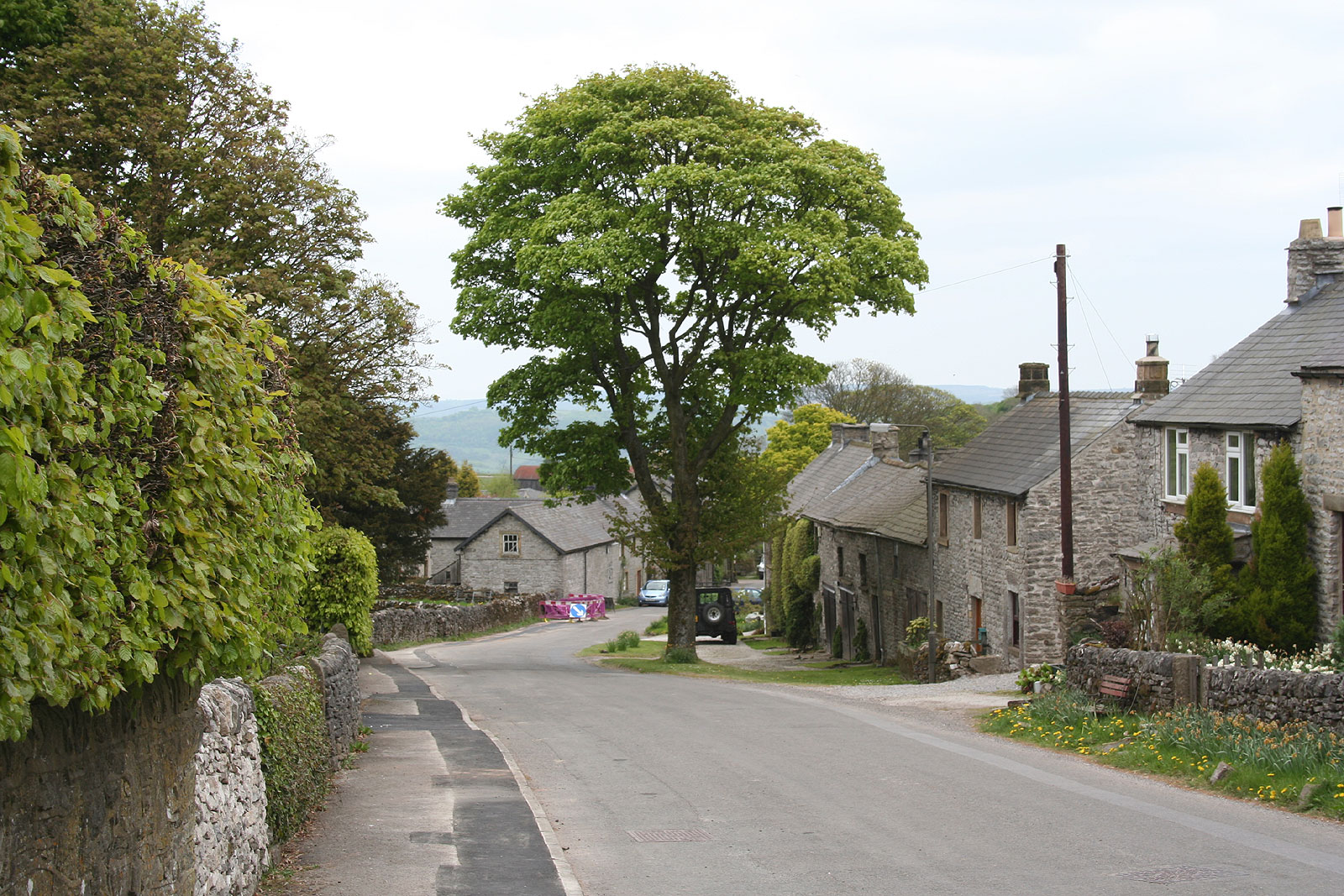

- Location within Derbyshire
- OS grid reference: SK173687
- District: Derbyshire Dales
- Shire county: Derbyshire
- Region: East Midlands
- Country: England
- Sovereign state: United Kingdom
- Post town: BAKEWELL
- Postcode district: DE45
- Dialling code: 01629
- Police: Derbyshire
- Fire: Derbyshire
- Ambulance: East Midlands
- UK Parliament: Derbyshire Dales

Sheldon is a village and civil parish in the Derbyshire Peak District, England, near Bakewell. It is best known for being the closest village to Magpie Mine, a lead mine with an engine house built in the Cornish style. Lead mining flourished around here in the 18th and 19th centuries. It is now scheduled as an ancient monument, and is the most complete example of a lead mine remaining in the Peak District. It is about 1050 feet above sea level.

The parish church of St Michael and All Angels was erected in the 19th century with material derived from dismantling the former Chapel of Ease.

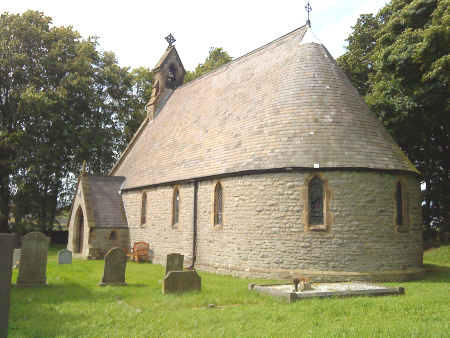
Church of St Michael and All Angels

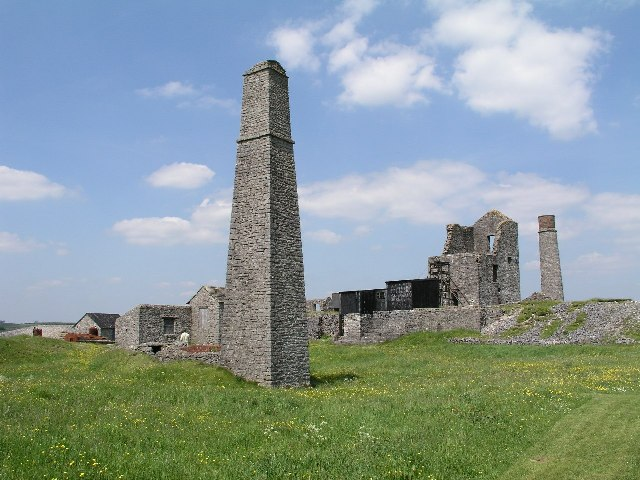
Magpie Mine

== Church ==
The parish church is dedicated to Saint Michael and All Angels. Some sources give the dedication as just "All Angels" and many sources refer to the church as just a chapel. The present church, which seats 140, was built in 1864 near the site of the old chapel. The burial ground is to the east.

== Governance ==
Sheldon is too small to have a parish council so administrative matters are dealt with by its parish meeting, formed from village residents as well as the elected chairperson. Sheldon has a small population of approximately 80 people according to the 2001 census. Sheldon used to have its own monthly magazine but since 2010 the magazine has merged with the Ashford Parish church magazine.

== The Sheldon Duck ==
The Sheldon Duck is a duck-like pareidolia found in an ash tree, which was felled at the beginning of the 20th century. According to local legend, in the early 1600s villagers saw a duck flying into an Ash tree, but they never observed it leaving the tree. When the same tree was felled, approximately 300 years later, a duck-like pattern with markings of the brain and lungs were found in the resultant timber boards. The boards were on display in Ashford in the Water Post Office for a while and postcards showing it were sold. Later, the timber merchant who felled the tree used these boards for making a mantlepiece at his home.

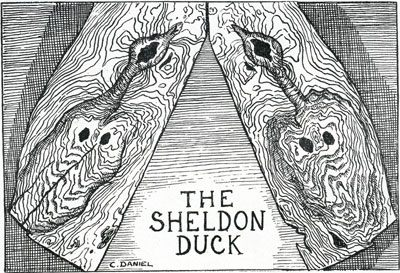
The Sheldon Duck

== See also ==
- Listed buildings in Sheldon, Derbyshire
