= Poole's Cavern =

Cave in Derbyshire, England

Coordinates: 53.2498°N 1.9259°W

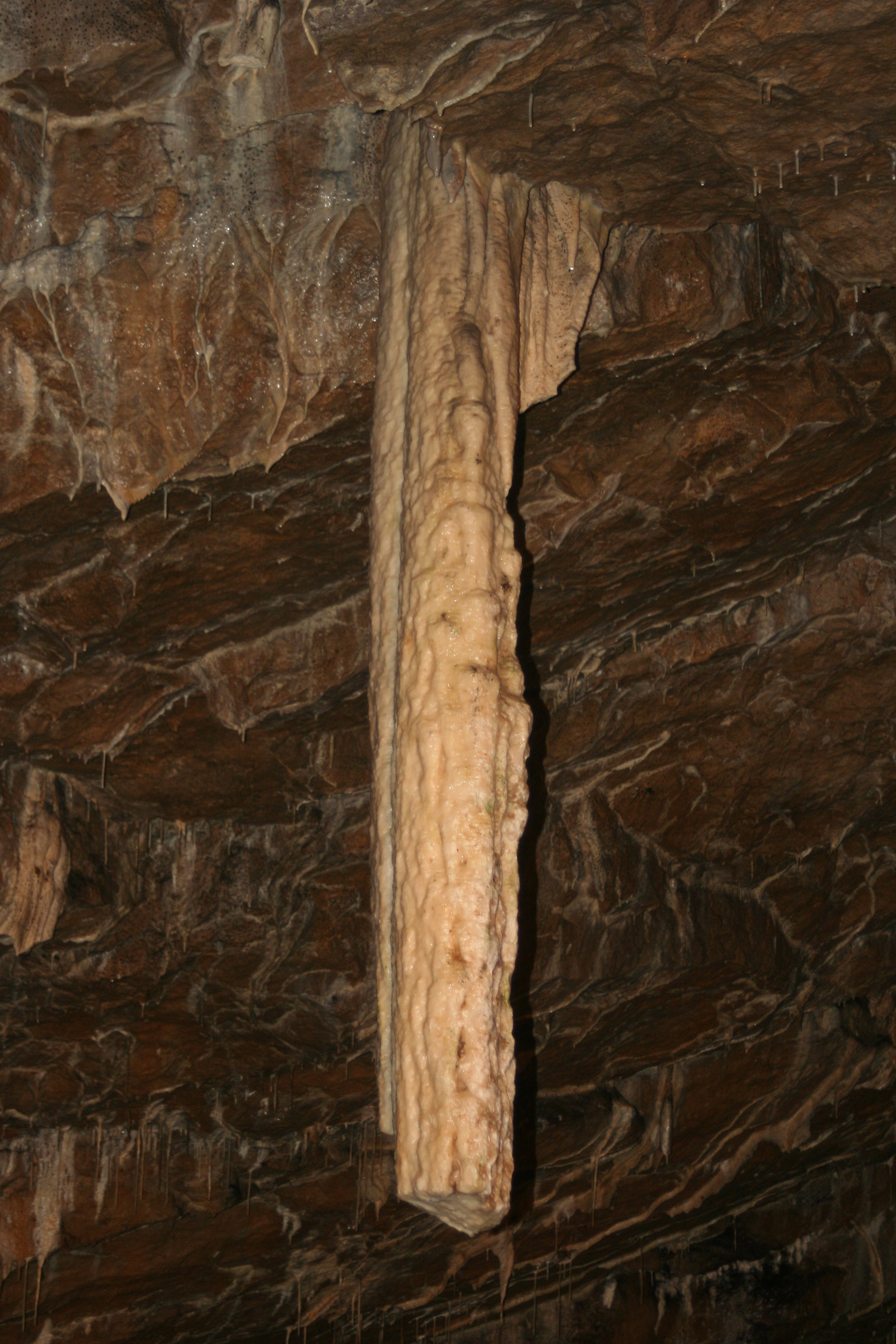
The Flitch of Bacon

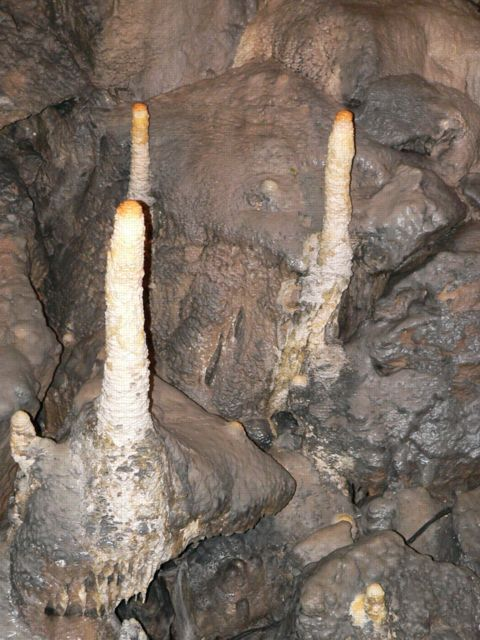
Poached egg stalagmites

Poole's Cavern or Poole's Hole is a two-million-year-old natural limestone cave on the edge of Buxton in the Peak District, in the county of Derbyshire, England.

Poole's Cavern forms part of the Wye system, and has been designated a Site of Special Scientific Interest.

== Human history ==
The name derives from an outlaw, Poole, who reputedly used the cave as a lair and a base to rob travellers in the fifteenth century. Archeological explorations in 1981 and 1983 have suggested that the cave was occupied from the Bronze Age. Some of the finds have been interpreted as suggesting that one of the chambers was used for religious purposes by Romano-Britons; an alternative explanation is that the cave was a metal-workers' workshop.

Officially opened as a show cave in 1853 by the 6th Duke of Devonshire, the cave was already a tourist attraction, being listed as one of the Seven Wonders of the Peak by Thomas Hobbes in 1636 and in Charles Cotton's poetic essay on the same subject in 1681. Early tour guides would attempt to extort money out of visitors by threatening to extinguish the lights and run away, leaving the visitor in darkness, if more money was not forthcoming. Mary, Queen of Scots, is claimed to have been an early visitor. Under the management of the Duke's overseer, Frank Redfern, the entrance was widened and, in 1859, a system of gas lamps was installed to light the caverns (one of the earliest uses of gas in this context), which remained in use until the cave closed in 1965. It reopened in 1976.

== Visiting ==
The region currently open to the public is around 310 metres (1,020 ft) in length, and includes chambers named the Roman Chamber, Great Dome, Poached Egg Chamber and Sculpture Chamber. Features of interest include large stalactites/stalagmites called the Flitch of Bacon and Mary Queen of Scots' Pillar, as well as stalagmites with a porous texture and "poached egg" colour, which has been attributed to minerals leached from lime-burning on Grin Low above. Part of the cavern is accessible to wheelchairs.

The cave system is believed to extend further, but has not been explored. In 1998 a video camera lowered down a borehole revealed the existence of a further chamber, branded "Seventh Heaven".

There is a visitor centre including a cafe and shop.

== Commentary ==
Referring to Hobbes' and Cotton's earlier work, the writer Daniel Defoe dismissed the cavern as merely "another of the wonderless wonders of the Peak".
