= River Wye, Derbyshire =

River Wye
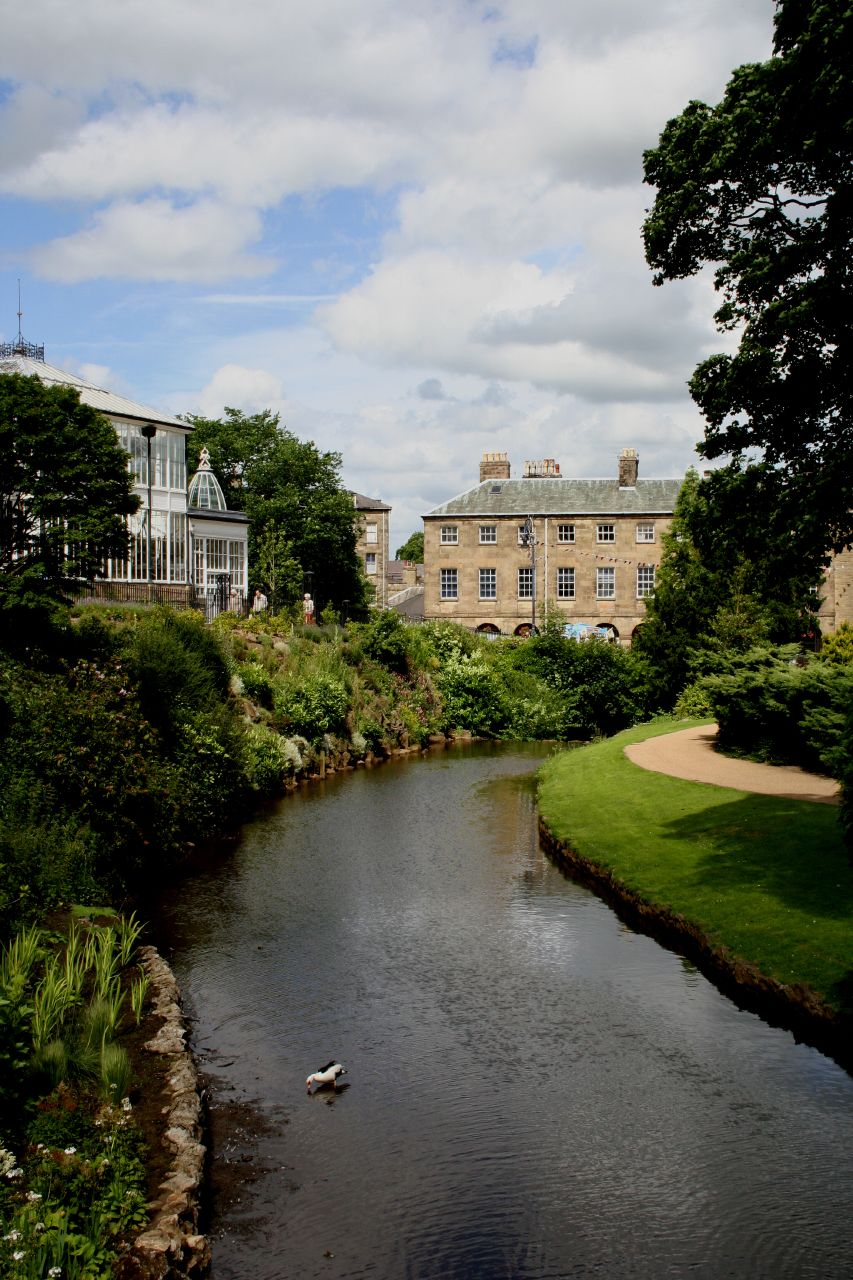
- River Wye in Buxton

- Confluence with Derwent in Derbyshire

Location
- Country: England
- Counties: Derbyshire

Physical characteristics
- Source
  - location: Axe Edge Moor, Derbyshire
- Mouth: Confluence with the Derwent
  - location: Rowsley, Derbyshire
  - coordinates: 53°11′08″N 01°36′46″W
- Length: 38.4 km (23.9 mi)
- Basin size: 277 km^{2} (107 sq mi)
- Discharge
  - location: Ashford (grid reference SK 182 696)
  - average: 3.23 m^{3}/s (114 cu ft/s)
  - maximum: 44.3 m^{3}/s (1,560 cu ft/s)

Basin features
- Tributaries
  - right: River Lathkill

The River Wye is a limestone river in the Peak District of Derbyshire, England. It is 23.9 miles (38.5 km) long, although it is widely quoted as being 15 miles (24 km) long, which refers to the section within the National Park. It is one of the major tributaries of the River Derwent, which flows into the River Trent, and ultimately into the Humber and the North Sea.

The river rises just west of Buxton, on Axe Edge Moor, and the flow is augmented by water which passes underground through Poole's Cavern before rising at Wye Head. The two sources join as they cross the Pavilion Gardens in Buxton. The river then flows east through the dales of the Wye Valley, along a route roughly followed by the A6 road. It enters the Peak District, flows just south of Tideswell, then through Ashford in the Water and Bakewell, passing to the south of Haddon Hall, before meeting the River Derwent at Rowsley. The main tributary of the river is the River Lathkill, which enters approximately one mile from its mouth.

It is possible to walk alongside much of the length of the river, either following public or permissive footpaths that run along the river bank, or following the former Manchester, Buxton, Matlock and Midland Junction Railway line, part of which is now the Monsal Trail and provides views of the river. Its final crossing of the river at Monsal Dale is by a viaduct some 70 feet (21 m) above the river, which enraged the writer John Ruskin at the time it was built, but is now a listed structure.

The River Wye is one of Derbyshire's best-known rivers and is popular with anglers because of the large numbers of wild brown, rainbow trout and grayling it contains. The alkalinity of the Wye provides a rich source of nutrients that leads to an abundance of insects, invertebrates and other wildlife. This ensures that the trout and grayling grow quickly on a diet of freshwater shrimp, caddisfly and mayfly. The river is the only river in Britain known to support a breeding population of rainbow trout, as most varieties do not breed in British waters.

The river has supplied water power to a number of water mills along its length in the past. Those on the upper river were largely used for milling corn, but cotton mills were a feature of buildings further down stream. Some have disappeared without trace, but several of the buildings have been reused for other purposes. Cauldwell Mill survived until recently, being operated by a charitable trust after it ceased commercial production in 1974. It served as a tourist attraction, but it closed in 2023 when the trust became bankrupt.

== Course ==
The River Wye rises as four small streams on Axe Edge Moor, to the south-west of Buxton. All four streams are crossed by the A54 road before they join and continue northwards. The river turns to the north east, and is crossed by a disused railway embankment, before it reaches Burbage, where it is crossed by Macclesfield Old Road and Bishop's Lane. A small tributary which flows to the south east joins on its left bank, as the river turns to the east. Another tributary, flowing southwards from a waterfall near Cavendish Golf Club, joins on the left bank just before it enters Pavilion Gardens, a grade II* listed park and gardens. They cover around 35 acres (14 ha) and during the 17th century were the private gardens of Buxton Hall. The area beside the river was enhanced in the 1830s by Joseph Paxton, for the 6th Duke of Devonshire, and further work took place in the 1870s. The 7th Duke gave it to the Buxton Improvements Company in the 19th century and ownership later passed to Buxton Corporation, who have retained it as a public park.

Within the park, the main channel is joined by another source of the Wye, which flows through the public show cave of Poole's Cavern and emerges on the north side of the B5059 Macclesfield Road at Wye Head. It enters the park and passes through some large ponds before the junction. Where the river reaches the eastern edge of the park, it enters a culvert. Prior to 1780, the river followed a west-to-east route beneath what is now The Crescent. The 5th Duke of Devonshire employed the architect John Carr to carry out building projects to make Buxton more attractive to visitors. In order the build The Crescent, he diverted the river further to the north, through a culvert, and then built the semi-circular building over the river bed. More of the river was culverted in the 1980s, to allow the Spring Gardens Shopping Centre to be built over it. Two small open sections are still visible before it passes under Bridge Street and a railway embankment to emerge into the open air again, close to the Ashwood Dale play area.

Here it is joined by another tributary. Hogshaw Brook rises on Combs Moss, and flows to the south east. Nun Brook rises near Blackedge Farm, and flows to the south. They join, and then enter a culvert which starts near Lightwood Avenue, and ends to the south of the freight-only railway line to Tunstead Quarry. The stream is crossed by the A6 Fairfield Road just before its junction with the Wye. Below Buxton, the river flows in a steep-sided valley, with the A6 road on its southern bank. The railway to Tunstead Quarry is sandwiched into the same valley, but takes a somewhat straighter course, crossing the river six times. The valley is called first Ashwood Dale, where there is a tributary which joins the right bank of the river, then Wye Dale, where the river is joined by another right-bank tributary which flows northwards through Deep Dale, and then Chee Dale. Here the railway to Tunstead Quarry turns northwards up Great Rocks Dale, while the original continuation of the Manchester, Buxton, Matlock and Midland Junction Railway to Matlock becomes the Monsal Trail, a walking, cycling and horse-riding trail that runs to Bakewell. The A6 road leaves the valley, to follow a more southerly route.

=== Middle river ===
Within Chee Dale, the river is crossed by a railway bridge carrying the Monsal Trail and another disused railway bridge which formed a chord to the Great Rocks Dale line. The Monsal Trail crosses on another railway bridge, and the river then loops back on itself and forms a large loop to the north. Wormhill Springs adds to the flow of the river, and Chee Dale Nature Reserve is on the left bank. The reserve covers 130 acres (53 ha) and is managed by the Derbyshire Wildlife Trust. It is notable for its ash woodland, limestone grassland, and the 200-foot (61 m) deep gorge through which the river runs. The Monsal Trail avoids the loop, crossing to the south of the river at is start and end, with a tunnel between the two bridges. The second bridge has three arches constructed of blue brick, supported by two pillars of limestone. A stream flowing northwards through Blackwell Dale joins the river on its right bank and the B6049 road crosses as the river enters Millers Dale. There are toilets and car parking available at the former Millers Dale railway station, which provides an access point both to the Monsal Trail, and to the riverside footpath which runs upstream along the left bank to Topley Pike junction, where the trail starts.

The next crossing is the north and south railway viaducts, two parallel bridges that cross the river obliquely. The south viaduct dates from 1862 to 1863, and is grade II* listed. A wrought iron deck is supported by three masonry arches to the west and three spans of wrought iron to the east. Because of the angle of the crossing, the pillars are staggered and are of an irregular hegagonal shape. The deck is around 80 feet (24 m) above the river, and carries the Monsal Trail. The north viaduct was added in 1905, as traffic on the railway increased. It is of similar appearance and is supported by four masonry arches to the west with three steel spans to the east. The stream which runs down Monk's Dale joins the river on its left bank, and a minor road to Litton Mill shares the valley. At Cressbrook, the stream that flows down Cressbrook Dale joins on the left bank. In Monsal Dale, the Monsal Trail emerges from a tunnel and crosses the river for the final time. The viaduct has five round arches, and is built of limestone rubble with brick detailing. It dates from 1862 to 1863, and has been repaired with gritstone and red bricks. It is around 300 feet (91 m) long, and carries the trail 70 feet (21 m) above the river. When this structure was built John Ruskin was enraged, and spoke of the Gods being banished by a scheme intended to convey "every Buxton fool to Bakewell in half an hour" and vice versa, "and you call this lucrative exchange—you fools everywhere".

The river makes a large loop back to the west. Halfway round the loop, the A6 road rejoins the valley, and crosses the river twice, before it reaches Ashford-in-the-Water. There are three bridges over the river in Ashford-in-the-Water. Sheepwash bridge has three shallow arches, and may have been built in the 18th century, although there are also suggestions that it may date from the 16th. There was an attached sheep dipping pen on the south east corner of the scheduled monument. Below the bridge, the river splits into multiple channels, associated with a water mill. The A6020 road crosses two channels, while below the mill building, Mill Bridge crosses the northern channel. It has three arches and carries a date stone showing "M Hyde 1664". The southern channel is crossed by Lees Bridge, with four arches dating from the 18th century, but remodelled in the 19th. The northern channel feeds Ashford Lake, part of the estate of Ashford Hall, which was built in 1785.

=== Lower river ===
Lumford Mill is situated on the left bank of the river. An early 19th century bridge with three sandstone arches crosses the river near the mill building, while just below the end of the tailrace is Holme Bridge. It is a packhorse bridge dating from 1664, is made of ashlar gritstone, and has five arches. Above the bridge the channel splits, with the southern channel feeding Victoria Mill. Where the tailrace emerges from beneath the mill yard, it is spanned by a single arched bridge with an attached stepped obelisk. Near where the tailrace rejoins the main river, it is spanned by a humpback bridge. Milford Bridge dates from the late 18th century or early 19th. The bridge carrying the A619 road over the river in Bakewell dates from around 1300. It has five pointed arches, with triangular cutwaters, which provide refuges to protect pedestrians from the traffic. It was widened in the 19th century, when the upstream side was built in a style to match the original, and is grade I listed.

A small bridge carries Agricultural way across the river, to provide access to Bakewell Showground. Sheep Bridge provides access to Haddon Park Farm, after which the river enters the grade I listed park and gardens of Haddon Hall. The gardens were laid out in the 17th century, but may have earlier origins, while the parkland dates from the 18th century, again with earlier origins. The main access to the hall is over a three-arched bridge built in 1663. Accounts for the building of the bridge still exist, in the archives of the Duke of Rutland. A little further downstream is Dorothy Vernon's bridge, a narrow footbridge with two arches dating from the 17th century. It is so named because Dorothy Vernon is believed to have used it to escape from the festivities of her sister's wedding to elope with her lover. As the river leaves Haddon Hall park, it is crossed by Old Fillyford Bridge, a three-arched bridge dating from the 18th century with parapets added in the 19th. It is no longer in use, as it has been replaced by the A6 dual carriageway bridge immediately to the south. The River Lathkill joins on the right bank below the bridge.

As the river approaches Rowsley, the main channel loops to the south, while a secondary channel continues straight on to feed Caudwell's Mill. The final bridge crosses the river just as the mill tailrace and main channel recombine. It carries the minor Peaktor Lane over the river. Shortly afterwards, the river empties into the River Derwent, which carries the water southwards to Matlock and Derby.

== Milling ==
The river has provided water power to a number of water mills. The furthest upstream was Buxton or Fairfield Mill. The first known mill on the site was built in the 13th century, but was damaged maliciously in the 1490s. There is still a significant drop in the surface level of the river at this point. Subsequently, a medieval mill was erected, probably on the same site. It is shown on maps dating from 1631 and 1791, as well as on the Fairfield Enclosure map of 1772. It is not known when it was demolished. Maps show a small corn mill close to the Ashwood Dale lime works. Dale End sawmill was powered by a breastshot iron waterwheel, 12 feet (3.7 m) in diameter and 3 feet (0.9 m) wide. It was located on the north side of the stone building, but the wheel is now derelict, although the building is in use as a store. It was built some time before 1883, and the weir and water channels are still visibile. Wye Dale water turbine was used to pump water from the river to Pictor Hall and local farms. The small stone building has a date stone showing 1893. Ordnance Survey maps from 1896 to 1900 labelled the building as a hydraulic pump, but in 1937-1938 they showed it as a steam pump.

At Wormhill there was a flour mill to the south of the former Millers Dale railway station, on the north bank of the river. King John granted a mill at Wormhill to Daniel Puiceman in the late 12th century, but it is not known if the later mill was built on the same site. The present building appears to have been built in three stages, with the oldest dating from 1860 and the newest from the 1920s. All three were modified in the 1970s, and they now house a craft centre. None of the original machinery remains. Tideswell corn mill may be located at the site of a mill mentioned in the Domesday Book in 1086. The present building was built by the Devonshire Estate, and for many decades was worked by members of the Dakin family, who eventually bought the site in the late 18th century. The last miller was George Dakin, who used the mill to make meal for almost 70 years until he died in 1912/13. After standing derelict for many years, the site was bought by Severn Trent Water Authority in 1970. The Arkwright Society carried out a survey of the building, and the machinery was removed, to be re-erected at Cromford Corn Mill, before the main structure was demolished in 1973, to make way for a borehole. The waterwheel was manufactured in Sheffield by Thomas Cavil in the 1860s. It was a low breast-shot wheel, with an iron frame, and was 13 feet (4.0 m) in diameter by 6 feet (1.8 m) wide. It was retained in situ, and was refurbished by Severn Trent in 1997, although the mill race remains dry.

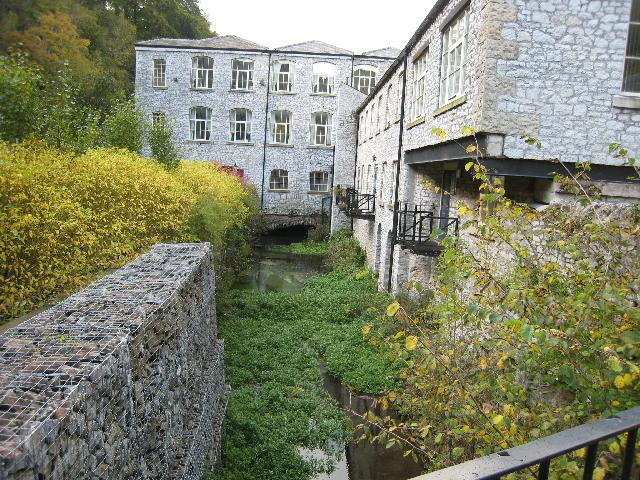
The millrace at Litton Mill. The mill buildings have been turned into flats.

Litton Mill, at Slack Side, Litton was built on the site of an earlier mill, as Senior's map of 1611 shows a corn mill there. However, around 1782 it was replaced by a water-powered cotton spinning mill built by Ellis Needham and his partners. This lasted until 1870, when a fire destroyed most of it, although some of the 1780s buildings remain. The mill was rebuilt in 1874, and continued to operate until 1997. The site retains an undershot water wheel, of unknown date, which was fed directly from the river, without the benefit of a mill pond. There is also a chimney and flue, located higher up on the side of the dale, which is the only one of its type in good condition in the Peak District. Gas to light the mill and the nearby village was produced in a gas house, constructed between 1820 and 1840. By 2002, this was in a very dilapidated state, but has subsequently been repaired and altered. The mill building has been converted into flats. A litle further downstream are the remains of a water-powered pump. It was used to pump spring water to a reservoir, was powered by a water wheel which was 4.9 feet (1.5 m) in diameter by 3.3 feet (1.0 m) wide, and was associated with Lees Rake and Burfoot Mines.

=== Below Cressbrook ===
Richard Arkwright built a cotton mill at Cressbrook in 1779, which only lasted until 1785, when it burnt down. His son, also called RIchard, bought the site in 1787, and started rebuilding the mill soon afterwards. This in turn was replaced by a new mill building between 1814 and 1816, constructed by William Newton with 12 bays and four storeys. To celebrate the coronation of Queen Victoria, the building was embellished with a clock and cupola in 1837. Many of the workforce were poor apprentices, who were better treated than those at nearby Litton Mill. They were housed in an Apprentice house, built in 1795. Cotton production ceased in 1967, after which the building was used by a stone-cutting business. When first built, the mill was powered by water from Cress Brook, as the Duke of Devonshire owned the water rights on the Wye.

The next mill site downstream is known as Ashford Bobbin Mill, although there is no known documentary evidence to support a local tradition that its early use was to produce bobbins for the nearby cotton industry. It appears to have been used as a bone mill, and then as a saw mill. Three water wheels survive, two to power the mills, and a third smaller one to pump spring water up to the village of Sheldon. In 1979, the Arkwright Society restored the buildings. The Black Marble Mill at Ashford-in-the-Water had a long history, as Thomas Accres constructed "an engyne for the sawing of blackstone" in 1595. Henry Watson built a new marble works on the site in 1748, and in 1751 patented a machine for cutting and polishing marble. A leat supplied three mill races, each with their own building and water wheel. The business was not a commercial success, until work on Chatsworth House started in the 1820s, when the mill supplied marble doorways and other marble fittings for the project. Two of the water wheels were replaced by water turbines in 1884 and 1885, although the third wheel was retained, as the building it powered had been rented out for the manufacture of combs. Production of marble products ceased in 1905, and little remains of the buildings, although the leats and turbines are still visible.

A second marble mill was built by George Redfern of Ashford-in-the-Water around 1846. It was known as Batch Mill or the Derbyshire Marble Works. A new weir was constructed in the river, at right angles to an existing weir which fed water to Ashford Corn Mill. A covered leat delivered water to the mill, which was housed in old farm buildings behind Great Batch Hall. The water wheel was replaced by a turbine around 1860, and production ceased before 1890. Ashford Corn Mill is a "L"-shaped building, dating from the 18th century, with additions made in the 19th and 20th centuries. It is also known as Flewitt's Corn Mill, and the complex includes a drying kiln. It was originally powered by two undershot water wheels, one made of iron and the other of wood. These were removed around 1900, and replaced by a single turbine, manufactured by Gilkes of Kendal. This drove three sets of stones, of which two remain, as they were replaced by rollers. The mill continued operating commercially until the 1970s, making it one of the last in the country to use water power. It is in good condition, with most of the machinery and the kiln still intact. A two-year project to refurbish the building was competed in 2017, and won the Peak District National Park Planning Award for Conservation in 2018. The mill has featured on Channel 4 TV's Remarkable Renovations programme, and on the BBC's Countryfile. The building is rented out as holiday accommodation. As part of the renovation, the water turbine was refurbished, enabling the mill to be self-sufficient for electrical power.

=== Lower river ===
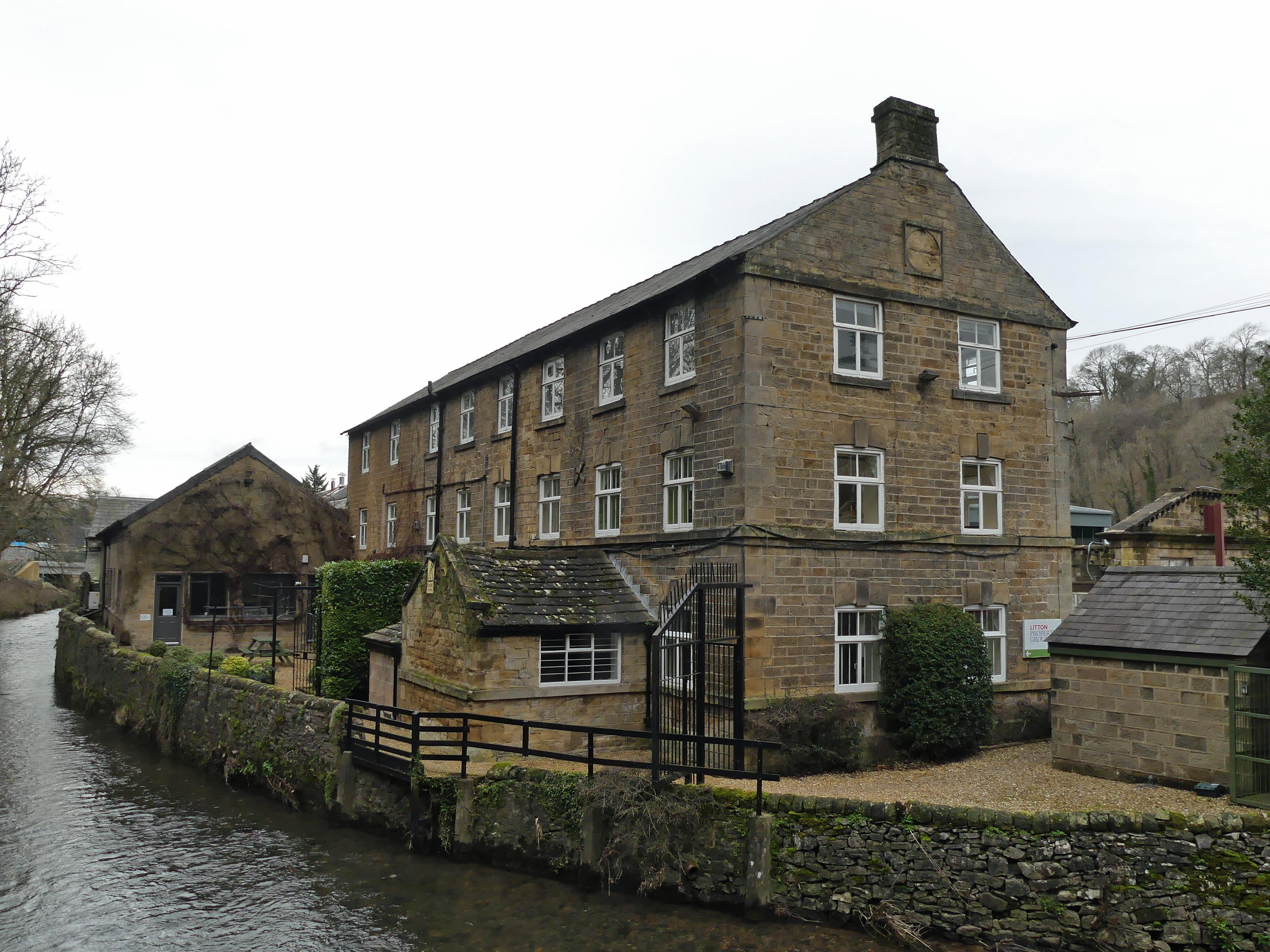
Lumford Mill at Bakewell

Richard Arkwright rented land for Lumford Mill from Philip Gell in 1777. There were some difficulties with water rights, but once these were resolved, he constructed a four-storey cotton mill powered by a single water wheel, fed by a leat from the river. This may not have been adequate, as Arkwright built a reservoir, and then two more reservoirs to ensure a good water supply. Arkwright and his son made at least three alterations to the course of the river, which resulted in legal disputes with the Duke of Rutland. The water wheel was replaced by a larger one in 1827, and in 1840 a larger mill race was built, allowing the reservoirs to be filled in. A second water wheel was added in 1852. Water power was probably supplemented by steam power, as a gas plant was built on the site in 1844. Much of the mill burnt down in 1868, and a new mill was constructed on a slightly smaller scale. Cotton production ceased in 1896, and the site was bought by DP Batteries in 1898. The water wheels failed in 1955, and were replaced by a 150 hp (110 kW) water turbine manufactured by Gilbert Gilkes & Gordon. The site was sold to W Fernehough Ltd in 1970.

The mill leat for Victoria Mill starts where the tailrace from Lumford Mill ends. A mill was mentioned in the Domesday Book, and it is probable that the same site was used for the more recent mill. The building was constructed around 1800 and was used for milling corn. The leat fed a breast-shot water wheel which was 16 feet (4.9 m) in diameter and 13.5 feet (4.1 m) wide. It continued to be used for grinding corn and animal feed until after 1945, although the precise date at which production stopped is not known. The building has iron-framed windows and a lucam for raising sacks of grain to the upper floors. The water wheel dated from around 1850, and was removed from its pit in 1971 to be restored, but this did not happen, and it has rusted away. Several of the windows next to the road had been filled in, but during restoration in 1970 were reglazed using iron framed windows removed from the rear of the building. The sluice and water wheel are separately listed. The sluice dates from the early 19th century, but may have been altered when a new wheel was fitted in 1850. It is constructed of dressed gritstone, and has iron machinery.

Rutland Works was another site where marble was processed, It was close to Bakewell Bridge, and when built in 1847, consisted of two stone buildings, with a water wheel between them. There was a timber yard behind the Manners Hotel, but this was severely damaged in the 1880s, after which the marble mill was extended, to include a saw mill. A water driven turbine was installed at a similar time. The works processed black marble, a type of carboniferous limestone which can be polished to produce an attractive black or grey stone. The stone-cutting machines remained in place until 1996. The final mill on the river is Caudwell's Mill at Rowsley. Records confirm that there was a mill at Rowsley in 1339, and in the 1500s there were two mills, one a corn mill and the other a fulling mill. A saw mill replaced the fulling mill between 1799 and 1840, but was abandoned around 1871. The corn mill ceased operating in 1858. Both were demolished and a new corn mill was constructed by John Caudwell in 1874. Four breast-shot water wheels provided the power to eight pairs of stones. However, roller milling arrived in Britain in 1877, and the mill was updated in 1881, when rollers replaced the mill stones. A turbine replaced the water wheels in 1887. Improvements continued to be made in the early 20th century. An American Little Giant turbine was installed in 1898, new rollers were fitted in 1905, most of the machinery was updated in 1914, and a Francis twin turbine was installed at the same time. Two purifiers were added in 1932. The building is grade II* listed. The mill ceased to be used commercially in 1974, but was taken over by a charitable trust. An electric motor was fitted to power the machinery, but all the other original equipment was retained. The mill closed in 2023, when the trust went into voluntary liquidation.

== Ecology ==
Water in the river benefits from being filtered by the surrounding limestone, and is consequently very clear. It is also alkaline, with a good variety of nutrients, providing ideal conditions for invertebrates and insects to flourish. These include Blue-winged Olive flies, caddisfly, gammarus and mayfly. The Haddon Estate, which manages much of the river, does not allow any pesticides to be used near the river corridor, and has a policy of using buffer strips to reduce erosion that can be caused by grazing animals.

Rainbow trout were imported into Britain in the 1890s from the Pacific coast of America. Some were hatched and kept in Ashford Lake at Ashford-in-the-Water, but some five years after their introduction a flood breached the dam impounding the lake, and the trout escaped into the river. The environment of the Wye suited them, and they became a self-sustaining spawning population. Later imports of rainbow trout were of the Shasta variety. and these do not spawn in British rivers. The Wye is the only known river in England with a population of wild rainbow trout, and is of interest to ecologists and dry-fly fishermen. Unlike American rainbow trout, which spawn in the winter, the fish in the Wye spawn in the spring. The proliferation of invertebrates in the river results in them growing fast, with mortality being very low.

Prior to 2003, some re-stocking of the river was carried out, but this has not been the case for over twenty years, and so the fish are truly wild. The Wye is also notable for populations of native brown trout and grayling. The fish provide food for other species, including otter, kingfisher, osprey and dipper. Recovery of the water vole population is aided by wetland areas with beds of iris and sedge, while marginal plants growing along the river banks include broad-leaved willowherb, common reedmace, greater pond sedge, marsh thistle, meadowsweet, meadow vetchling, water figwort, water forget-me-not and water mint. Common species of trees that grow beside the river include willow, alder, poplar, oak and ash.

== Access ==
From Buxton to Deep Dale, the A6 road runs alongside the river, but the road has no footpaths, and so cannot be easily viewed. However, at Deep Dale there is a car park from which a public footpath runs along the right bank of the river. At Topley Pike junction, walkers can ascend onto the railway formation at the start of the Monsal Trail, or can cross the river and follow the footpath on the left bank. The footpath passes through a ravine where overhanging cliffs abut the river. In good conditions, walkers can continue along the Chee Dale stepping stones, which are made of limestone blocks placed in the river in ancient times, but when the river is high, they become too dangerous to use, and visitors can only use the Monsal Trail. The footpath continues along the river to Millers Dale, ending near the former railway station where there is another car park. The minor road to Litton Mill then runs along the left bank, and is quite close to the river. Beyond Litton Mill, a permissive footpath follows the left bank to Cressbrook, where it crosses to the right bank and rises to reach the Monsal Trail.

From Cressbrook to Monsal Head, a minor road runs along the floor of the valley, which is wider than it was through Millers Dale. From Monsal Head, where the Monsal Trail leaves the river, a public footpath follows the right bank of the river to Lees Bottom, where it ends at the A6 road. The road then follows the river, and there is another section of public footpath on the right bank as it approaches Ashford-in-the-Water. Below the village, a short section of path follows the right bank opposite Ashford Lake. Below Bakewell, public footpaths follow the left bank as far as Haddon Hall, beyond which the river can only be seen at a distance from the A6 road or from bridges.

Some of the river is also accessible by canoe or kayak. There is a suitable launching point at the Deep Dale car park, and the river can be paddled either to Millers Dale station or to Litton Mill. There is a 6-foot (1.8 m) sloping weir to negotiate within 0.5 miles (0.80 km) of the start point. The journey from Deep Dale to Litton Mill is about 4.5 miles (7.2 km) and is rated as grade 2 or 3 for difficulty.

== Water quality ==
The Environment Agency assesses the water quality within the river systems in England. Each is given an overall ecological status, which may be one of five levels: high, good, moderate, poor and bad. There are several components that are used to determine this, including biological status, which looks at the quantity and varieties of invertebrates, angiosperms and fish. Chemical status, which compares the concentrations of various chemicals against known safe concentrations, is rated good or fail.

The water quality of the River Wye was as follows in 2019/2022:

Section	Ecological Status	Chemical Status	Length	Catchment
Wye from Source to Monk's Dale	Good	Fail	7.6 miles (12.2 km)	30.26 square miles (78.4 km^{2})
Wye from Monk's Dale to Derwent	Moderate	Fail	16.3 miles (26.2 km)	30.81 square miles (79.8 km^{2})

While the ecological status of the upper river was good, the lower river was moderate, due to the presence of high levels of zinc in the water. Like most rivers in the UK, the chemical status changed from good to fail in 2019, due to the presence of polybrominated diphenyl ethers (PBDE), which had not previously been included in the assessment.

== See also ==
- List of rivers in the Peak District
- List of rivers of England
- Rivers of the United Kingdom
