= Listed buildings in Harthill, Derbyshire =

Harthill is a civil parish in the Derbyshire Dales district of Derbyshire, England. The parish contains eight listed buildings that are recorded in the National Heritage List for England. All the listed buildings are designated at Grade II, the lowest of the three grades, which is applied to "buildings of national importance and special interest". The parish contains part of the settlement of Alport and countryside to the south and east. The listed buildings consist of houses and cottages, a barn, two bridges, and a former water mill.

== Buildings ==
Name and location	Photograph	Date	Notes
Harthill Hall and Cottage; 53.17872°N 1.65848°W	—	16th century	A farmhouse that has been altered and extended and divided into two dwellings. It in limestone and gritstone, with roofs of stone slate and tile, and gables with moulded copings. There are two storeys and an irregular plan. Most of the windows are mullioned or mullioned and transomed, and in the later part there are sash windows.
Barn, Harthill Hall Farm; 53.17833°N 1.65849°W		16th century	The barn, which has been altered and extended, is in limestone and gritstone, with gritstone dressings, quoins, and a stone slate roof. There are two storeys, three bays, and later extensions to the east. Most of the openings have chamfered surrounds and four-centred arched or segmental heads.
Alport Mill; 53.17833°N 1.66882°W		18th century	A former corn watermill by the River Lathkill, it is in limestone and gritstone, with gritstone dressings, quoins, and a stone slate roof with a louvred vent. There are three storeys, extensions in one and two storeys, and an irregular plan. On the east side is a waterwheel with a diameter of 21 feet (6.4 m). At the rear is a doorway with a quoined surround and a loft door above, and elsewhere are mullioned windows and a sash window.
Bridge northwest of Alport Mill; 53.17858°N 1.66907°W	—	18th century	The bridge crossing the River Lathkill is in limestone, and consists of three shallow segmental arches, the middle arch the largest. The low parapets have flat copings.
Mill Bridge; 53.17789°N 1.66926°W		18th century	The bridge carries Cliff Lane over the River Lathkill. It is a narrow bridge in gritstone, and consists of a single segmental arch. The bridge has voussoirs, squared spandrels, coped parapets ramped up to the centre, and splayed wing walls.
Cratcliff Cottage; 53.15714°N 1.66109°W	—	Late 18th century	A house with barn to the west under a continuous roof, later combined into a house, in gritstone with a tile roof, coped gables, and moulded kneelers. There are two storeys, the house and barn have two bays each, and there is a single-bay extension to the east. The doorways have flush surrounds, the windows are mullioned, and on the extension is an external staircase.
Broadmeadow Cottages; 53.17601°N 1.66616°W		Early 19th century	Offices, later converted into three cottages, in limestone and gritstone, partly rendered, with gritstone dressings, quoins, and stone slate roofs. There are two storeys, the west cottage projecting and taller, the outer cottages have two bays, the central cottage has one, and there is an attached outbuilding. Most of the cottages have mullioned windows with Gothic tracery.
Harthill Lodge; 53.17925°N 1.65571°W		Early 19th century	A cottage in Gothic style, in limestone with gritstone dressings, quoins, and a stone slate roof with overhanging eaves. There is a single storey, a double range plan, and two bays. The doorway has a moulded surround, a four-centred arched head, and a bracketed porch roof. The windows have moulded surrounds, pointed heads, and incised spandrels, and contain casements.
