= Youlgrave Waterworks =

Water supply company in Derbyshire, England

- Type: Private company limited by guarantee
- Industry: Utility
- Founded: 1829
- Headquarters: Youlgreave, Derbyshire, England

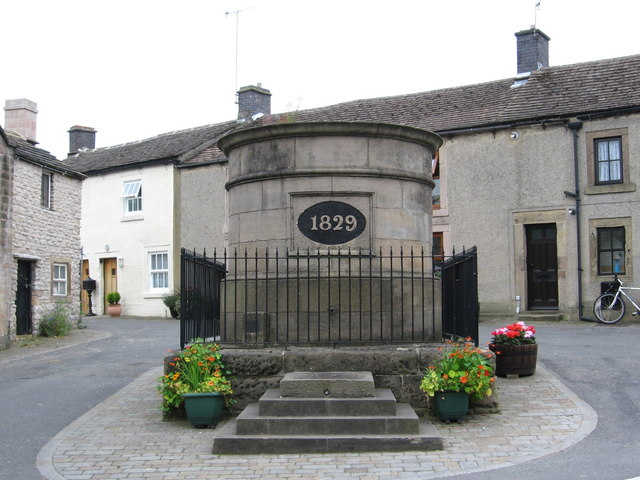
The conduit head

Youlgrave Waterworks is a small water supply company in the village of Youlgreave (also spelt Youlgrave), Derbyshire. Established by a public subscription in 1829 the Waterworks provided a single conduit head outlet for the village. It was expanded by a second subscription in 1869 which added more public taps and private connections. The company now supplies around 500 homes and businesses in the village.

It is unusual in being a private water supply company in an industry dominated by statutory undertakers. Because of this Youlgrave Waterworks is not regulated by Ofwat but by the environmental health arm of the local authority. The company narrowly escaped closure in 2002 when its insurer refused to renew its cover.

== Background and establishment ==
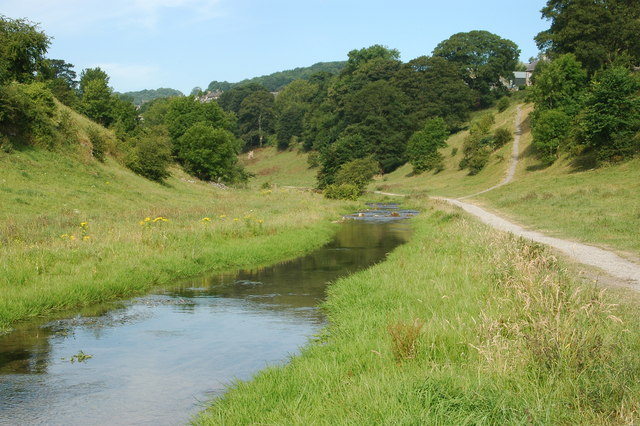
The Bradford Dale at Youlgreave

The village of Youlgreave (also spelt Youlgrave), is situated in the Derbyshire portion of the Peak District. Villagers had traditionally collected water from springs and watercourses in the nearby Lathkill and Bradford dales. In the summer months the lower water quantity in these sources concentrated toxins, causing elevated levels of infant mortality. Because of this July-August in Youlgrave was known as "fever season".

In 1827 local woman Hannah Bowman (1758-1842) established the Women’s Friendly Society of Youlgrave. Bowman, an elderly spinster, belonged to a farming family that claimed a lineage back to the Norman conquest and whose Quaker parents had instilled in her the importance of charity. The Society soon decided that the reliable supply of clean water was a priority for the village. A public subscription was begun towards this aim. Bowman contributed £100 and the lord of the manor, John Manners, 5th Duke of Rutland, subscribed £50.

A Youlgrave resident and surveyor designed a system that would run a 2-inch (51 mm) diameter pipe over 1,100 yards (1,000 m) from a spring at Mawstone, south of the village, to a 1,500-imperial-gallon (6,800 L; 1,800 US gal) tank, known as a conduit. The conduit provided a point for villagers to collect water and was sited in the market place, on the location of the village's Saxon cross. The works were completed in July 1829 and cost £252 13s 10.5d (equivalent to £23,986 in 2025).

The conduit stood 9 feet (2.7 m) tall and became known locally as "the fountain". Access was controlled with a water keeper unlocking the conduit at 6 o'clock every morning; the conduit was allowed to fill overnight and was capable of supplying 10,000 imperial gallons (45,000 L; 12,000 US gal) per day. It soon became a hub of village life as villagers congregated while waiting to fill buckets with water. The gritstone conduit has been a grade II listed building since 12 July 1967. It has not been uniformly praised with architectural historian Nikolaus Pevsner describing it as a "big plain lumpy circular conduit head".

The Youlgrave Waterworks Company was formed to manage the water supply and villagers were charged six pence per day to access it.

== Expansion ==
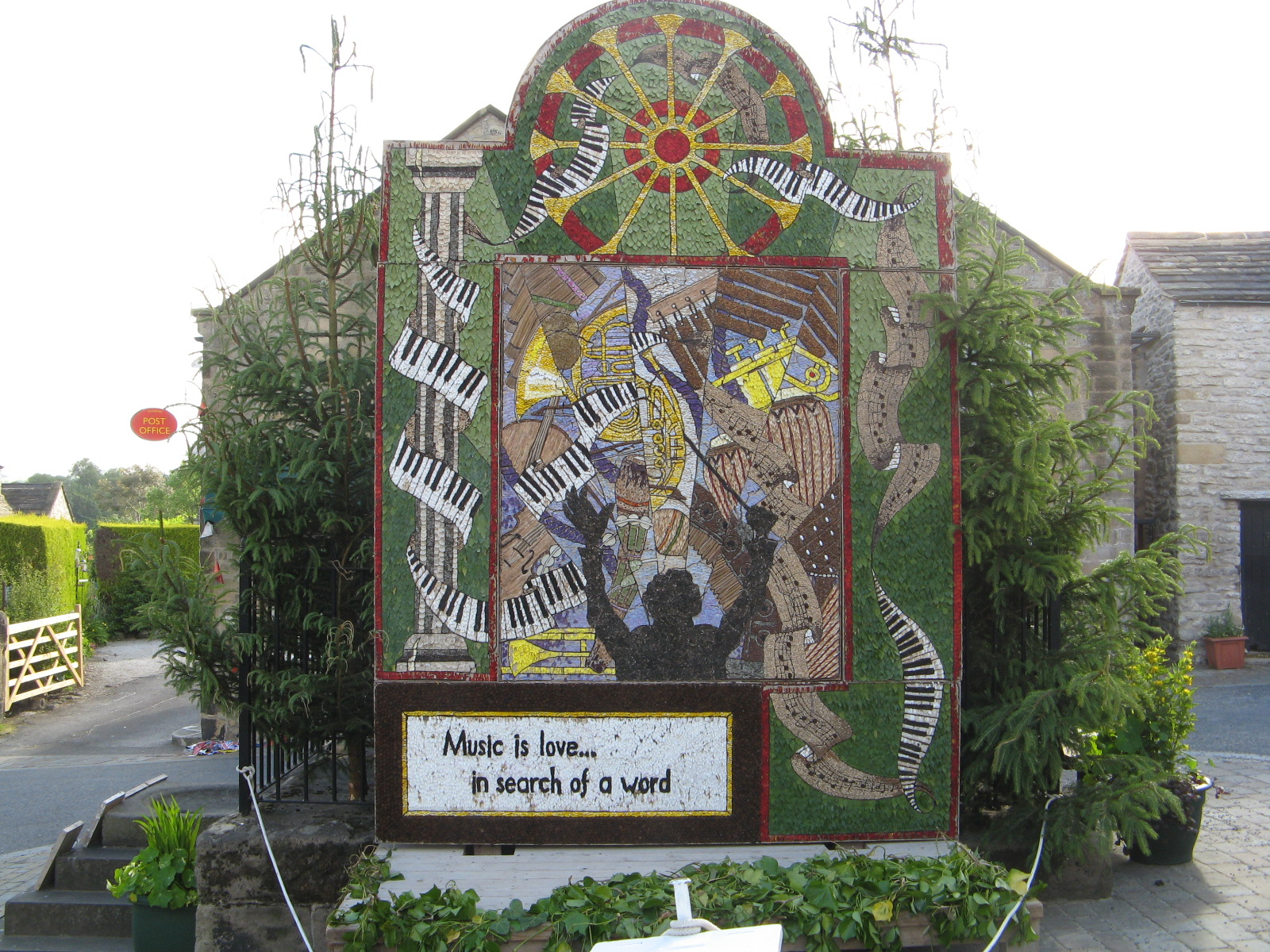
Well dressing at the conduit, 2008

By 1869 the original pipework was suffering from corrosion, threatening the supply. A new subscription was raised to repair the pipe, connect an additional spring (Bleakly), install ten public taps across the village and provide private connections to some houses. In addition to the subscription every able-bodied man in the village was asked to provide three days labour or funds to pay for the equivalent. The works were completed in November 1869 at the cost of £381 (equivalent to £39,210 in 2025). To mark the occasion the ancient Peak District tradition of well dressing was revived in the village.

By 1926 the system was suffering from low pressure and increased demand so another series of upgrade works was carried out.

== Operation ==
Youlgrave Waterworks Ltd was incorporated on 8 February 1996. It is a not-for-profit private company limited by guarantee but run for community benefit and managed by twelve volunteer directors. Youlgrave Waterworks is not a statutory undertaker, unlike most water companies in the United Kingdom, and is not regulated by Ofwat. It is instead regulated by the local authority environmental health department. Its charging model is derived from that first established in 1829; consumers are generally charged a flat rate for access to the network, regardless of actual usage, though some larger properties and commercial units are required to have water meters fitted.

Most current needs are met by spring water, though in times of high demand a well at the former Mawstone Mine is also used. The water passes through a small treatment works where it is chlorinated and pH balanced. The village remains one of a small number in the UK served entirely by a private supply and not by one of the Ofwat-regulated companies. The Youlgrave Waterworks is a water only company, sewerage services are provided to the village by Severn Trent.

== Recent events ==
The Waterworks was threatened with closure in 2002 when its insurer, Cornhill Insurance, refused to renew its policy and it had difficulty finding alternative cover. The company blamed an increase in litigation culture and the effects of the September 11 attacks on the insurance industry. At one point the Waterworks held talks with Severn Trent to take over the supply. Cornhill granted an extension of 30 days to give the company time to find alternative insurance. Youlgrave Waterworks approached Derbyshire County Council, Member of Parliament for West Derbyshire Patrick McLoughlin (who had negotiated the 30-day extension) and Prince Charles for help. The company was saved just two days before the policy expiry when Zurich Municipal agreed to provide cover. This led to a premium 70% higher than under the old policy.

The local supply has been beneficial for Youlgrave, for example during the 2018 British Isles cold wave, the water supply was maintained while other Derbyshire villages on the mains lost water. In recent years much work has been carried out to bring the network up to modern standards, a full ring main was established and a new treatment works installed by November 2019. The Waterworks currently extracts 22,000,000 imperial gallons (100,000,000 L; 26,000,000 US gal) a year and supplies around 500 households and businesses.
