= Hart Hill =

Hart Hill may refer to the following hills or places in the United Kingdom:

- Hart Hill (Stirling) (437 m), a hill in Stirling, Scotland
- Hart Hill (Moray) (276 m), a hill in Moray, Scotland
- Hart Hill (Glos) (263 m), a hill in Gloucestershire, England
- Hart Hill (Cheshire), a hill in the Delamere Forest, Cheshire, England
- Hart Hill, Kent, a Site of Special Scientific Interest in Kent, England

== See also ==
- Hart Hills, Antarctica
- Harthill (disambiguation)
