= Listed buildings in Youlgreave =

Youlgreave is a civil parish in the Derbyshire Dales district of Derbyshire, England. The parish contains 56 listed buildings that are recorded in the National Heritage List for England. Of these, one is listed at Grade I, the highest of the three grades, one is at Grade II*, the middle grade, and the others are at Grade II, the lowest grade. The parish contains the village of Youlgreave, the hamlet of Alport and the surrounding countryside. Most of the listed buildings are houses, cottages and associated structures, farmhouses and farm buildings. The other listed buildings include a church and associated structures, a public house, bridges, a milestone, a conduit head, a school, a youth hostel and a telephone kiosk.

== Key ==
Grade	Criteria
I	Buildings of exceptional interest, sometimes considered to be internationally important
II*	Particularly important buildings of more than special interest
II	Buildings of national importance and special interest

== Buildings ==
Name and location	Photograph	Date	Notes	Grade
All Saints' Church; 53.17608°N 1.68420°W		12th century	The church has been altered and extended through the centuries, and was restored in 1869–70 by Norman Shaw. It is built in gritstone and limestone, and consists of a nave with a clerestory, north and south aisles, a south porch, a chancel, and a west tower. The tower has three stages, stepped angle buttresses, and a west doorway and a three-light window, both in Perpendicular style with hood moulds. On the south side is a polygonal staircase turret. Above the window is a moulded string course, two-light mullioned windows, a clock face on the west side, paired bell openings, a coved cornice with central and corner gargoyles, and embattled parapets with central and corner crocketed pinnacles. There are also embattled parapets along the body of the church.	I
Sundial, All Saints' Church; 53.17591°N 1.68404°W		Medieval	The sundial in the churchyard is in stone. It has a large moulded octagonal base, and curves inwards at the top on a four-stepped square stone plinth. On the top is an octagonal copper dial inscribed with the name of the churchwarden and the date 1752, and a scrolled gnomon. The upper part is said to be an upturned medieval font.	II
Pair of arches southwest of Lomberdale Hall; 53.17145°N 1.70617°W	—	Medieval	The pair of arches, moved from elsewhere to the garden of the house, are in stone, in Early English style, and about 10 feet (3.0 m) high. Each arch is set on a low plinth, it is narrow with a tall point, and is deeply moulded.	II
Shop west of Bull's Head Chambers; 53.17516°N 1.68641°W		Early 17th century	The former shop is in limestone with gritstone dressings, quoins to the west, and a slate roof with moulded stone copings and kneelers to the west gable. There are two storeys and a single bay. On the front is a doorway, a shop window to its right, and a casement window above. The right gable end contains two blocked windows with hood moulds.	II
Monks Hall and Cottage, walls and gate piers 53.17725°N 1.67118°W		Early 17th century	The house, which has been divided into two, is in gritstone with quoins, and a stone slate roof with moulded stone copings and kneelers to the gables. There are two storeys and an irregular plan. The main doorway has a chamfered quoined surround, and the windows are mullioned, including a gabled dormer. Attached to the house are garden walls with gate piers.	II
Old Hall; 53.17482°N 1.68771°W		Early 17th century	The house, which has been extended, is in limestone and gritstone, with gritstone dressings, quoins, and a stone slate roof with moulded gable copings. There are two storeys, and it consists of a main central range flanked by projecting gabled wings. In the central range is a doorway with a quoined surround, to its left is a four-light mullioned window, and above is a gabled dormer with three lights. The outer bays contain mullioned windows with six lights in the ground floor and five in the upper floor. At the rear are two gabled wings.	II
Old Hall Farmhouse; 53.17547°N 1.68781°W		1630	The farmhouse is in limestone with gritstone dressings, quoins, and a stone slate roof with overhanging eaves and moulded gable copings. There are two storeys and attics, and four bays, the left bay projecting and gabled. The doorway has a chamfered quoined surround, the windows are mullioned or mullioned and transomed with hood moulds, and there is a dormer. Above the doorway is an initialled and dated plaque.	II*
Dove Cottage; 53.17564°N 1.68756°W		17th century	The house is in limestone and gritstone, with gritstone dressings, quoins and a stone slate roof. There are two storeys and three bays. The central doorway has a large lintel, and quoins on the north side. The windows are mullioned, and contain casements.	II
Turret House and railings 53.17581°N 1.68538°W		17th century	The house is in limestone on a plinth, with gritstone dressings, quoins, a chamfered eaves band, and a stone slate roof with moulded gable copings and plain kneelers. There are two storeys, a double depth plan, and a front of three bays. In the centre is a doorway with a chamfered surround and a bracketed moulded stone hood. To its left is a canted bay window, and the windows are sashes. In the west gable end is a blocked two-light mullioned window with a hood mould. The front garden is enclosed by a low stone wall containing square piers with pointed tops, and decorative iron railings.	II
Conksbury Hall; 53.18720°N 1.68766°W	—	Early 18th century	The house, which was extended in the 19th century, is in gritstone on a plinth, the extension is in limestone with gritstone dressings, and the house has chamfered quoins, floor bands, a moulded eaves cornice, and stone slate roofs with moulded gable copings and kneelers. There are two storeys with attics, two bays and a two-bay extension. The doorway has fluted jambs, and a moulded segmental pediment on brackets. In the extension is a doorway with a moulded surround, and the windows in both parts are mullioned. At the rear is a projecting staircase bay containing a full-height mullioned and double-transomed window.	II
Rock House; 53.17837°N 1.67090°W		Early 18th century	The house, which was extended to the west later in the 18th century, is in gritstone with chamfered quoins, the earlier part on a plinth with coved eaves, and with a roof of stone slate and tile, with stone coped gables, plain kneelers, and ball finials. The earlier part has three storeys and three bays. In the centre is a doorway with a bracketed hood, the windows are sashes with moulded surrounds, and in the middle of the top floor is a circular window. To the left, the later wing has two storeys and two bays, and contains a canted bay window and sash windows.	II
Auburn House and railings 53.17592°N 1.68515°W		1734	The house is in gritstone, with chamfered quoins, and a tile roof with stone coped gables and moulded kneelers. There are three storeys and three bays. In the centre is a doorway with a large bracketed moulded hood, flanked by canted bay windows with moulded cornices. The upper floors contain sash windows, and in the middle of the top floor is an initialled datestone with a hood mould. At the front of the house is a low wall with iron railings and stone gate piers with pointed tops and acorn-type finials.	II
Bull's Head Hotel and Chambers; 53.17521°N 1.68624°W		Mid 18th century	The public house and offices, which were later extended, are in limestone and gritstone, and have tile roofs with crested ridge tiles, stone coped gables and moulded kneelers. There is a T-shaped plan, the earlier part at right angles to the road, with three storeys. The later part is parallel to the road, with two storeys, and five bays. In the centre is a four-centred archway with a keystone depicting a bull's head. Above it is a jettied timber framed gabled dormer. The windows in both parts are mullioned, and the doorway has a chamfered surround.	II
Cottage east of 5 Church Street; 53.17613°N 1.68479°W		Mid 18th century	The cottage is in limestone with gritstone dressings, quoins, and a stone slate roof with stone coped gables. There are two storeys and two bays. The doorway is in the centre, and the windows are mullioned, with two casements.	II
Eastern gates, steps and walls, All Saints' Church; 53.17642°N 1.68374°W		Mid 18th century	The eastern entrance to the churchyard is flanked by two square gritstone gate piers about 8 feet (2.4 m) tall. Each pier has a moulded base and cornice, and an acorn-shaped finial on a moulded base. Between them are iron gates with an iron lantern arch above. From these, low walls with chamfered copings lead down to the street, flanking a flight of five steps.	II
Western gate piers and gates, All Saints' Church; 53.17602°N 1.68455°W		Mid 18th century	A the western entrance to the churchyard are three square gate piers in gritstone about 8 feet (2.4 m) tall. Each pier has a moulded cornice and an acorn-shaped finial on a moulded base. Between the piers are iron gates dating from the late 19th century, with decorative circles at the base and scroll work to the top.	II
Coal Pit Bridge; 53.18331°N 1.68045°W		Mid 18th century	The bridge carries a track over the River Lathkill. It is in limestone with dressings, parapet and copings in gritstone, and is about 3 feet (0.91 m) wide. The bridge consists of three segmental arches, the middle arch the largest. At the ends are pairs of square piers with pyramidal copings.	II
Footbridge over River Bradford (east); 53.17316°N 1.67992°W		18th century	The footbridge crossing the River Bradford, originally a packhorse bridge, is in limestone with gritstone copings. It is a narrow bridge, canted in the centre, and consists of a single segmental arch. The bridge has voussoirs, and low parapets with semicircular copings, the parapet walls splaying out slightly towards the ends.	II
Footbridge over River Bradford (mid); 53.17279°N 1.68247°W		18th century (probable)	A clapper bridge crossing the River Bradford. It is in gritstone, and consists of two large blocks and a pier on the riverbed, carrying large flat slabs.	II
Footbridge over River Bradford (west); 53.17260°N 1.68895°W		18th century (probable)	A clapper bridge crossing the River Bradford, probably replacing an earlier bridge. It consists of seven limestone blocks on the riverbed, on which are five long limestone slabs.	II
Meadow Place Grange Farmhouse; 53.18911°N 1.70044°W		Mid 18th century	The farmhouse, which was extended in 1859, is in rendered and painted stone on a plinth, with painted stone dressings, chamfered quoins, a coved eaves band, and a slate roof with stone coped gables and moulded kneelers. There are three storeys, two bays, and a single-bay rear extension. The central doorway has a moulded and bracketed hood, and the windows are sashes. On the extension is a datestone.	II
Medway Cottage and attached cottage 53.17455°N 1.68841°W		Mid 18th century	A house, later divided and extended, it is in gritstone, partly rendered, with gritstone dressings, quoins, and a tile roof with stone coped gables and moulded kneelers. There are two storeys and four bays. The left cottage has a doorway with a quoined surround and a keystone, and mullioned windows. The right cottage contains a doorway with a plain surround, and the windows are sashes.	II
Road bridge 53.17262°N 1.68210°W		18th century (probable)	The bridge carries Mawstone Lane over the River Bradford. It is in limestone, and consists of four blocks on the river bed carrying large limestone slabs. The parapets have a band halfway up, and stone copings.	II
Thimble Hall; 53.17528°N 1.68673°W		18th century (probable)	A limestone cottage with a stone slate roof, two storeys and a single bay. The doorway has a thin stone hood, to its right is a two-light horizontally-sliding sash window, and in the upper floor is a single-light window.	II
Stores Cottages; 53.17494°N 1.68621°W		Mid 18th century	A pair of gritstone cottages on a plinth, with quoins, a coved eaves band, and roofs of tile and stone slate. There are two storeys, the west cottage has three bays and the east cottage has two. The west cottage has a doorway with a quoined surround and a keystone, blocked with a window inserted, an inserted doorway to the east, a Venetian window with a keystone, and a sash window, and the other windows are mullioned. The east cottage has a doorway with a plain surround and mullioned windows.	II
Obelisk, All Saints' Church; 53.17571°N 1.68214°W		Late 18th century	The obelisk in the churchyard was moved here from Fountain Square in 1829. It is in stone, square and tapering, about 6 feet (1.8 m) high, with a pointed top. It stands on a stepped square stone base.	II
Haddonfields Farmhouse; 53.17835°N 1.67020°W	—	Late 18th century	The farmhouse is in roughcast stone with gritstone dressings, quoins, an eaves band, and a slate roof with stone coped gables and plain kneelers. There are three storeys and three bays. The central doorway has a bracketed hood, and the windows are sashes.	II
Hill View and barn 53.17744°N 1.67075°W	—	Late 18th century	The house and attached barn are in rendered stone with gritstone dressings and stone slate roofs, the barn roof hipped. The house has two storeys and two bays, mullioned windows, a single-light window and a sash window. The barn has a single storey, and a single bay, and contains a large flat-headed arch with attached Doric columns, and two large decorative stone plaques.	II
Ivy Cottage; 53.17477°N 1.68284°W		Late 18th century	A pair of cottages combined into one house, it is in limestone and gritstone with gritstone dressings, quoins and a tile roof. There are two storeys and two bays. The doorway has a wooden porch, and the windows are mullioned and contain two casements.	II
Lathkill House Farmhouse; 53.17771°N 1.67237°W		Late 18th century	The farmhouse is in sandstone with gritstone dressings, quoins, and tile roofs with stone coped gables and moulded kneelers. There are two storeys and an L-shaped plan, with a front range of three bays, and a three-bay rear range. The doorway has a quoined surround and a keystone, and the windows have a single light or are mullioned. At the rear is a doorway with a four-centred arched head and a moulded surround.	II
Milestone; 53.18242°N 1.69819°W	—	Late 18th century	The milestone on the south side of Back Lane consists of a stone slab with slightly splayed sides and a saddleback top. It is inscribed with the distances to Ashbourne and Bakewell, and to other places whose names are illegible.	II
Mill Cottage; 53.17815°N 1.66944°W	—	Late 18th century	The cottage is in rendered stone with gritstone dressings, a stone slate roof, two storeys and three bays. The doorway has a plain surround, and the windows are mullioned with two lights.	II
The Vicarage; 53.17540°N 1.68533°W		1776	The front of the vicarage is in gritstone, elsewhere it is in limestone with gritstone dressings, quoins, a moulded eaves cornice, and a slate roof with stone coped gables and moulded kneelers. There are three storeys, and a front of three bays. The entrance is at the rear, and the windows are sashes.	II
1 Church Street and railings 53.17608°N 1.68477°W		Early 19th century	Two cottages, later combined, the house is in limestone with gritstone quoins, painted dressings, and a stone slate roof with a stone coped gable and moulded kneelers to the east. There are two storeys and two bays. The doorway has a plain surround, to the west is a blocked doorway, and the windows are mullioned, the ground floor windows with casements, and above with sashes. In front, there is a low stone curving wall with iron railings, and piers with rounded tops.	II
3 and 5 Church Street and railings 53.17603°N 1.68489°W		Early 19th century	A pair of cottages in limestone with gritstone dressings, quoins, and a stone slate roof with a stone coped gable and moulded kneelers to the west. There are two storeys and each cottage has one bay. The doorways have plain surrounds, there is one single-light window, and the other windows are mullioned with two lights. In front, there is a low stone wall with iron railings, and gate piers with rounded tops.	II
Beech Cottage and attached cottage 53.17547°N 1.68564°W		Early 19th century	A pair of houses in gritstone with quoins, a coved eaves band, and a roof partly in slate and partly in stone slate, with stone coped gables and moulded kneelers. There are two storeys, Beech Cottage has a single bay and the attached cottage has two bays. Beech Cottage has a doorway with a quoined surround, the other cottage has a doorway with a plain surround, and the windows in both cottages are sashes.	II
Bradford House and The Cottage; 53.17734°N 1.67081°W		Early 19th century	A house, and an attached pair of cottages combined into a house, they are in roughcast stone with gritstone dressings, and stone slate roofs with stone coped gables and plain kneelers. Bradford House has three storeys, three bays, a canted plan, and chamfered quoins. The Cottage, to the west, has two storeys and two bays. Both houses have doorways with plain surrounds and sash windows.	II
Fern Glen; 53.17824°N 1.67105°W	—	Early 19th century	The house is in rendered stone on a plinth, with gritstone quoins to the east, and a stone slate roof with a stone coped gable and plain kneelers to the east. There are two storeys and three bays. The central doorway has a semicircular head, impost blocks, and a traceried fanlight, and the windows are sashes.	II
Linden Cottage; 53.17650°N 1.68407°W	—	Early 19th century	A pair of cottages combined into one house, it is in gritstone with painted stone dressings, quoins, and a slate roof with stone coped gables and moulded kneelers. There are two storeys and two bays. The central doorway has a quoined surround and a hood on brackets, and the windows are sashes.	II
Raper Lodge; 53.18231°N 1.68141°W		Early 19th century	The house is in limestone with gritstone dressings, quoins, and a hipped stone slate roof. There are two storeys and three bays, the middle bay much projecting under a pedimented gable with a coved cornice and moulded copings. The windows are mullioned with moulded surrounds and pointed lights, and at the rear is a doorway with a four-centred arched head.	II
Riverside; 53.17818°N 1.67116°W	—	Early 19th century	The house is in gritstone, with quoins on the west, and a stone slate roof. There are two storeys and three bays. In the centre is a semicircular-headed doorway with a fanlight under a lean-to with a slate roof that extends to the west. The windows are sashes with plain surrounds.	II
Rose Cottage and Sunny View; 53.17764°N 1.67013°W		Early 19th century	A pair of cottages in limestone and gritstone with gritstone dressings, quoins and a slate roof. There are two storeys and each cottage has two bays. Both cottages have central doorways, and mullioned windows with two lights containing Gothic tracery.	II
The Cottage; 53.17768°N 1.67118°W	—	Early 19th century	A gritstone house with quoins, and a stone slate roof with a stone coped gable and moulded kneelers to the west. There are two storeys and two bays. The central doorway has a plain surround, and the windows are mullioned with two casements.	II
Woodside View; 53.17373°N 1.68162°W		Early 19th century	The house is in limestone with gritstone dressings, quoins, and a slate roof. There are two storeys, two bays, and a lean-to on the east. The doorway has a plain surround and the windows are mullioned.	II
Conduit Head; 53.17524°N 1.68658°W		1829	The conduit head, which stands in the middle of a road junction, is in gritstone. It has a circular plan on a large square plinth, a deep base with moulding to the top, and a moulded string course and cornice. On the south side is a stone plaque with a moulded edge, and an inset oval inscribed with the date.	II
Lathkill House, railings and walls 53.17597°N 1.68502°W		c. 1840	The house is in gritstone with a slate roof, two storeys and three bays. The central doorway has a reeded surround, and a stone hood with egg and dart moulding on brackets. The windows are sashes with wedge lintels. Enclosing the front garden are low walls, and railings with fleur de lys finials.	II
Lomberdale Hall; 53.17221°N 1.70485°W		1844	The house, which was extended in 1857, is in gritstone on a plinth, with corner pilasters, moulded string courses, parapets with moulded copings, and a slate roof with stone coped gables. It is in two and three storeys, both parts have fronts of two and three bays, and they are linked by a recessed gabled bay. The doorway in the linking bay has a pointed head and Gothic tracery. On the east front is a large porch, and a two-storey canted bay window. The other windows are mullioned and contain casements.	II
Garden seat and sundial, Lomberdale Hall; 53.17168°N 1.70561°W	—	c. 1844	The seat in the garden of the house has been rebuilt using medieval stone fragments on three sides. The east side is open, and there is a felted roof. The back wall contains a blind arcade, in the side walls are embedded gravestones, and in the south wall is an engraved stone plaque. To the east is a sundial on a re-used medieval column.	II
Barn east of Old Hall Farmhouse; 53.17553°N 1.68763°W		19th century	The barn is in limestone with gritstone dressings, quoins, and a slate roof with stone coped gables and plain kneelers. There are two storeys and a single bay. The doorways have quoined surrounds, and on the south gable wall are external steps.	II
Lomberdale Hall Cottage; 53.17244°N 1.70459°W		1851	A cottage and stable, later a cottage, in limestone with gritstone dressings, quoins, and a slate roof. There are two storeys, a double pile plan, and a front of two bays. It contains doorways with quoined surrounds, sash and casement windows, and steps leading to a hayloft door. A doorway on the north front has a dated lintel.	II
All Saints School and School House; 53.17642°N 1.68329°W		1866–68	The school and school house, designed by Samuel Rollinson, are in limestone with gritstone dressings, quoins, and roofs of red and blue tile. The school has a single storey and six bays, the west bay projecting, and on the roof is a gabled bellcote. The house to the west has two storeys and an L-shaped plan. On the front is a porch with a four-centred arched doorway and a fanlight. The windows have a single light, or are mullioned.	II
YHA Hostel; 53.17501°N 1.68644°W		1887	A shop and warehouse converted into a youth hostel in about 1974, it is in gritstone with quoins, and a hipped slate roof. There are four storeys, a front of three bays, and sides of five bays. On the front, the first floor, which is approached by steps, contains an arcade of three semicircular-headed arches with moulded surrounds. The middle arch contains a doorway and the others have windows, all with inscriptions. In the upper floors are sash windows with chamfered surrounds, those in the second floor with flat heads, and in the top floor with semicircular heads. Between the top floor windows is a semicircular-headed niche containing the carving of a beehive, an inscription and dates.	II
Raenstor Close and garage 53.17740°N 1.67822°W		1911	A large house in gritstone, with quoins, and a green slate roof with moulded copings and finials. There are two storeys and attics, and an L-shaped plan, with a garden front of six bays and an entrance front of three bays. The middle bay of the entrance front projects and is gabled, and it contains a semicircular arch with a keystone. To the east is a single-storey bay window, beyond it is a square tower, and above is a metal clock face. On the garden front is a bay window, and a semicircular verandah with fluted columns. On the north tower is a domed bellcote on balusters. The windows are mullioned or mullioned and transomed. To the north is a linked garage.	II
Garden walls, pergola and gate piers, Raenstor Close; 53.17751°N 1.67908°W		1911	The walls are in gritstone, limestone and red brick, and have an irregular plan, flanking the drive and enclosing parts of the garden. Attached to the walls are a pergola, and gritstone gate piers, some with banded rustication. A recessed portion of the wall has a pair of semicircular arches, with a figure of Orpheus carved on the central pillar.	II
Lodge, stable block and outbuilding, Raenstor Close; 53.17746°N 1.67955°W		1911	The building is in gritstone with quoins, some decoration in red brick, and a green slate roof, and is in Arts and Crafts style. There are two storeys and roughly an L-shaped plan, with a lodge, a stable block to the south, and an outbuilding to the west. The east front has a semicircular archway with a keystone, above which is a recessed section of timber framing. To the right is a semicircular bay containing a doorway with a chamfered quoined surround with a hood, and a conical roof. To the right is a gabled bay, to the left are two further bays, and the windows are mullioned.	II
Telephone kiosk 53.17464°N 1.68765°W		1935	The K6 type telephone kiosk in Holywell Lane was designed by Giles Gilbert Scott. Constructed in cast iron with a square plan and a dome, it has three unperforated crowns in the top panels.	II
