= Listed buildings in Over Haddon =

Over Haddon is a civil parish in the Derbyshire Dales district of Derbyshire, England. The parish contains nine listed buildings that are recorded in the National Heritage List for England. All the listed buildings are designated at Grade II, the lowest of the three grades, which is applied to "buildings of national importance and special interest". The parish contains the village of Over Haddon and the surrounding countryside. The listed buildings consist of four farmhouses and associated structures, a former cotton mill and sluice gate, a footbridge over the River Lathkill, a house, a church, and a telephone kiosk.

== Buildings ==
Name and location	Photograph	Date	Notes
Manor House Farmhouse; 53.19475°N 1.69459°W		17th century	The farmhouse, which has been altered and extended, is in limestone with gritstone dressings, quoins, and tile roofs with moulded gable copings. There are two storeys and attics, two gabled bays and a single-bay extension on the right. Between the two left bays is a doorway with a quoined surround, and to the right is a gabled porch. The windows are mullioned, and contain casements.
Conksbury Farmhouse; 53.18572°N 1.68696°W		1725	The farmhouse is in roughcast stone with gritstone dressings, quoins, and a stone slate roof. There are two storeys, two bays, and a later single-storey extension to the east. The doorway has a dated and inscribed lintel, and the windows are mullioned.
Sough Mill and sluice gate 53.19209°N 1.69826°W		18th century	The former corn mill is in limestone with gritstone dressings and stone slate roofs. There are two storeys, a lower two-storey extension to the east, and a single-storey lean-to on the east. To the west is a gritstone weir in the River Lathkill with a wooden sluice gate in the centre.
Mona View Farmhouse and outbuildings 53.19460°N 1.69602°W		1756	The farmhouse and attached outbuildings are in limestone with gritstone dressings, quoins, and tile roofs. The farmhouse has coped gables and moulded kneelers, a coved eaves band, two storeys and three bays. The central doorway has a bracketed stone hood, to the east is a canted bay window with a moulded cornice and parapet. To the west is a 20th-century windows, and the upper floor contains a single-light window and two-light mullioned windows. On the front facing the street is a doorway with an initialled and dated lintel. The outbuildings to the west have two bays, and contain a doorway with a quoined surround, and mullioned and sash windows.
Footbridge; 53.19187°N 1.69804°W		Late 18th century (probable)	The footbridge carries a footpath over the River Lathkill. It consists of a series of limestone slabs carried on limestone piers about 1.5 feet (0.46 m) high.
Vernon Cottage; 53.19424°N 1.69233°W		Late 18th century	A house in limestone with gritstone dressings and a slate roof. There are two storeys and two bays. On the front is a doorway, and two-light mullioned windows containing casements.
Haddon Grove Farmhouse (East); 53.19197°N 1.73120°W		Early 19th century	The farmhouse is in limestone with gritstone dressings, quoins, and a stone slate roof with coped gables and plain kneelers. There are two storeys and three bays. The central doorway has a bracketed moulded stone hood, and the windows are sashes in raised plain surrounds.
St Anne's Church; 53.19404°N 1.69682°W		1879–80	The church is in limestone with sandstone dressings, and a tile roof with a terracotta ridge. It consists of a nave with a projecting bay at the west end, a south porch, a lower chancel, and a north vestry. On the west gable is a bellcote that has an ogee arch on each side with crockets, surmounted by a pinnacle. Above the western bay is a pierced embattled parapet with crocketed pinnacles.
Telephone kiosk 53.19460°N 1.69621°W		1935	The K6 type telephone kiosk in Main Street was designed by Giles Gilbert Scott. Constructed in cast iron with a square plan and a dome, it has three unperforated crowns in the top panels.
