= Conksbury =

Deserted medieval settlement in Derbyshire, England

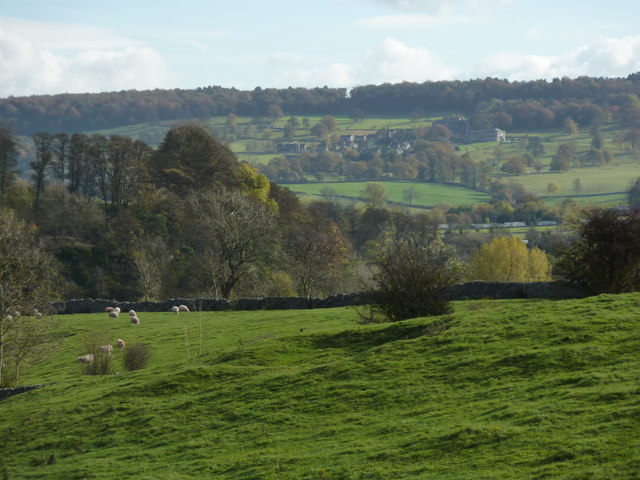
- Site of Conksbury village looking towards Stanton in Peak
- Interactive map of Conksbury
- 53°11′00″N 1°41′50″W
- Type: Settlement
- Periods: Middle Ages
- Location: Youlgreave
- Region: Derbyshire, England

History
- Condition: Buried remains

Site notes
- Public access: Public road on south edge

Scheduled monument
- Official name: Conksbury deserted medieval settlement
- Reference no.: 1014589

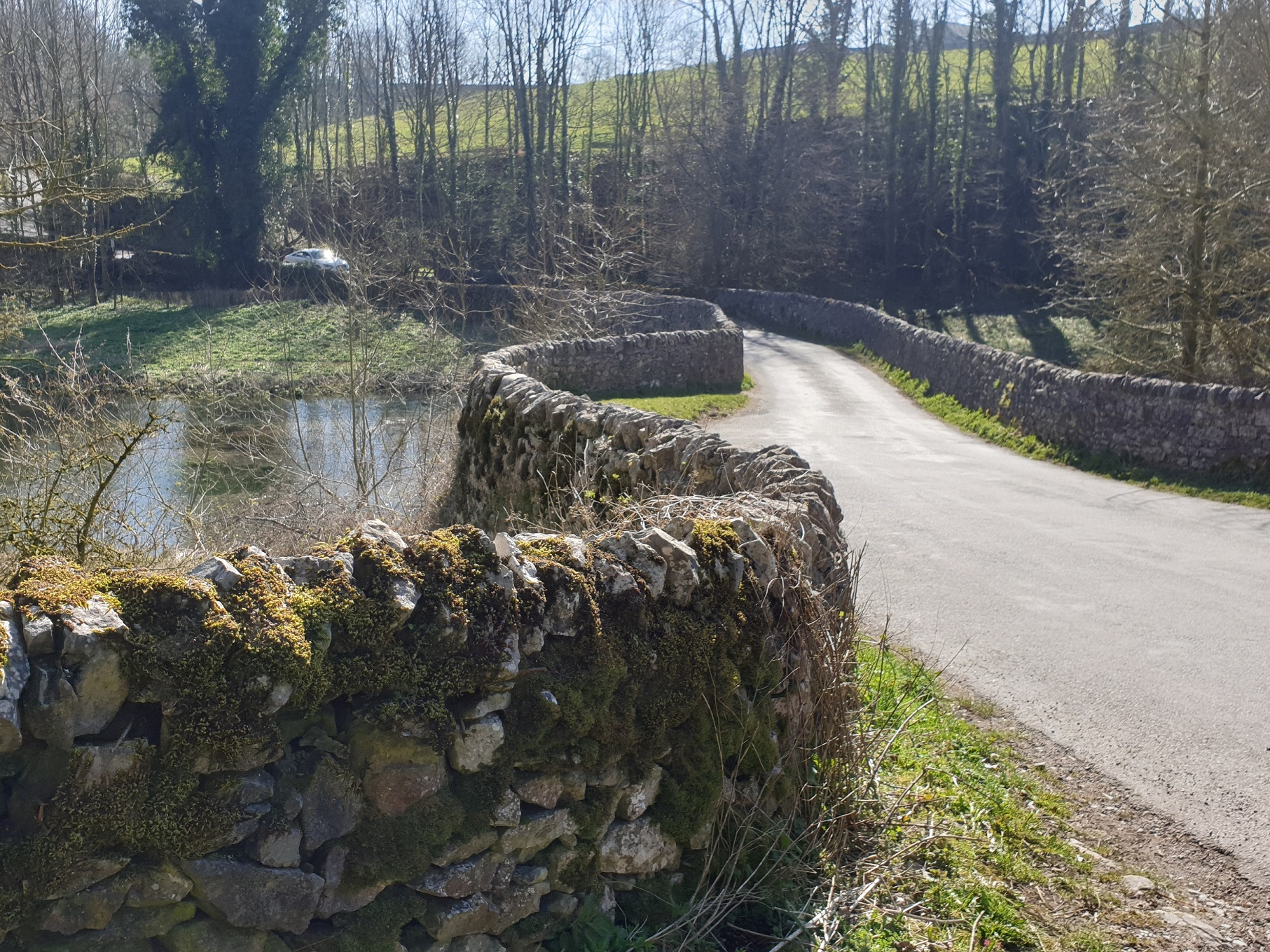
Conksbury Medieval Bridge

Conksbury is the site of a deserted medieval settlement between Over Haddon and Youlgreave in Derbyshire, England.

== History ==
The village was recorded in the Domesday Book of 1086 AD as Cranchesberie in the hundred of Blackwell, in the county of Derbyscire. The settlement was one of seven berewicks (surrounding estates) within the royal manor of Bakewell. It was listed as part of the lands owned by William the Conqueror, with the following details documented for Bakewell (including Burton; Conksbury; Holme; Monyash; [Nether and Over] Haddon; One Ash and Rowsley):

- Households: 35 villagers. 16 smallholders. 2 priests. 1 men-at-arms.
- Farming: 18 ploughlands. 7 lord's plough teams. 11 men's plough teams.
- Meadow 80 acres. Woodland 1 by 1 leagues. 1 mill, value 10 shillings and 7 pence. 1 church. 3 church lands.
- Tenant-in-chief in 1086: King William
- Lord in 1066: King Edward

William the Conqueror subsequently granted the manor of Bakewell to the Norman knight William Peverel. Peverel established Lenton Priory and set up Meadow Place as a monastic grange for the priory next to Conksbury. Conksbury and its mill were later given to the Abbey of St Mary de Pre by William Avenal of Haddon. Conksbury and Meadow Place became property of the Crown after the dissolution of the monasteries in the 16th century. By 1610 the Cavendish family had purchased the land, which became part of the Devonshire estate. The site of the deserted village is a protected scheduled monument. There are visible earthwork remains of building platforms and enclosures either side of a road that was 10 metres (33 ft) wide.

Conksbury medieval bridge over the River Lathkill is a designated Grade II listed structure. The bridge was built in the mid-18th century from limestone rubble with gritstone dressings. It carries the road between Bakewell and Youlgreave. The bridge was authorised to collect tolls in the 1758 Turnpike Act. The curving bridge has three main arches with pointed cutwaters.

Conksbury Hall is an 18th-century gritstone house on the western edge of the site of the medieval village. It was designated as a Grade II listed building in 1967. On the same side of the site, Conksbury Farmhouse is also a Grade II listed building, dating from 1725 (the door lintel is inscribed 'S/CF 1725 BH').
