= St Anne's Church, Over Haddon =

St Anne’s Church, Over Haddon
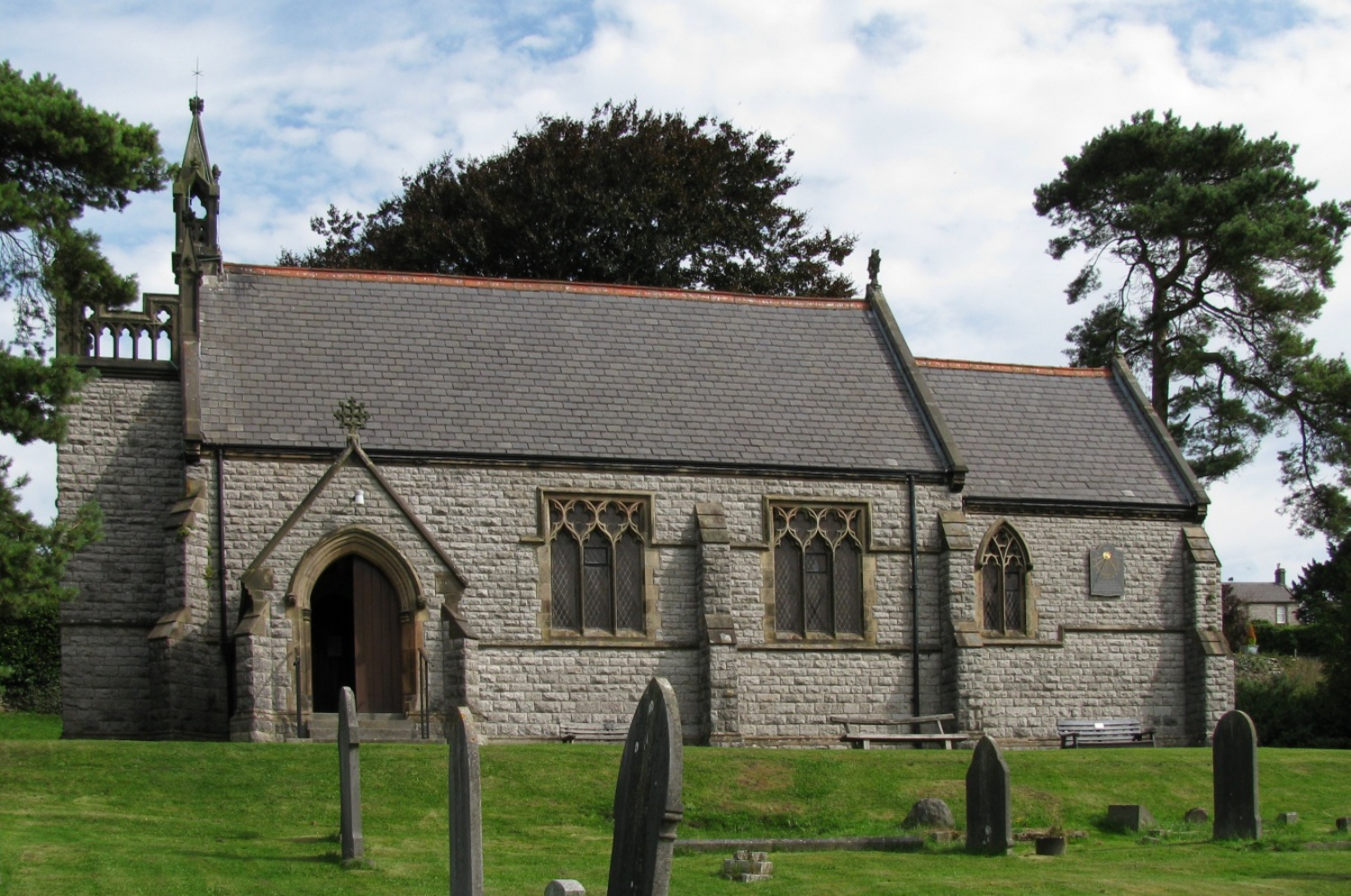
- St Anne’s Church, Over Haddon
- St Anne’s Church, Over Haddon
- 53°11′37.53″N 1°41′47.65″W
- OS grid reference: SK 20356 66371
- Location: Over Haddon, Derbyshire
- Country: England
- Denomination: Church of England

History
- Dedication: St Anne
- Consecrated: 26 July 1880

Architecture
- Heritage designation: Grade II listed
- Architect: H Cockbain
- Groundbreaking: 26 June 1879
- Completed: 26 July 1880

Administration
- Province: Canterbury
- Diocese: Derby
- Archdeaconry: Chesterfield
- Deanery: Bakewell & Eyam
- Parish: Over Haddon

St Anne's Church, Over Haddon is a Grade II listed parish church in the Church of England in Over Haddon, Derbyshire.

== History ==
The church was built between 1879 and 1880 by the architect H Cockbain of Middleton, Greater Manchester. The foundation stone was laid by Miss M. Nesfield, daughter of R.W.M. Nesfield of Castle Hill, Bakewell on 26 June 1879 The contractors were Messrs. J.R. and A. Hill of Tideswell and Litton. It was constructed in Ricklow Dale stone, with windows, doors and arches of wrought freestone from Sheldon Moor. Maw's tiles were laid in the nave, aisle and porch. The chancel and baptistry floors were paved in polished marble Mosaic, the steps being of Bardilla. The bell was case by Mears and Stainbank, the benches by J. Heywood of Manchester, and the stone carving by Mr. Ash of Buxton. The wrought iron entrance gates were made by Messrs Thomason of Birmingham and Manchester. The church was consecrated by the Bishop of Lichfield on 26 July 1880.

== Parish status ==
The church is in a joint parish with:

- All Saints’ Church, Bakewell
- Holy Trinity Church, Ashford-in-the-Water
- St Katherine's Church, Rowsley
- St Michael and All Angels' Church, Sheldon

== Organ ==
An organ was installed in 1988 by the Johnson Organ Company A specification of the organ can be found on the National Pipe Organ Register.

== See also ==
- Listed buildings in Over Haddon
