= Harthill, Derbyshire =

Civil parish in Derbyshire, England

Coordinates: 53.167°N 1.664°W

Harthill
- Hamlet and civil parish
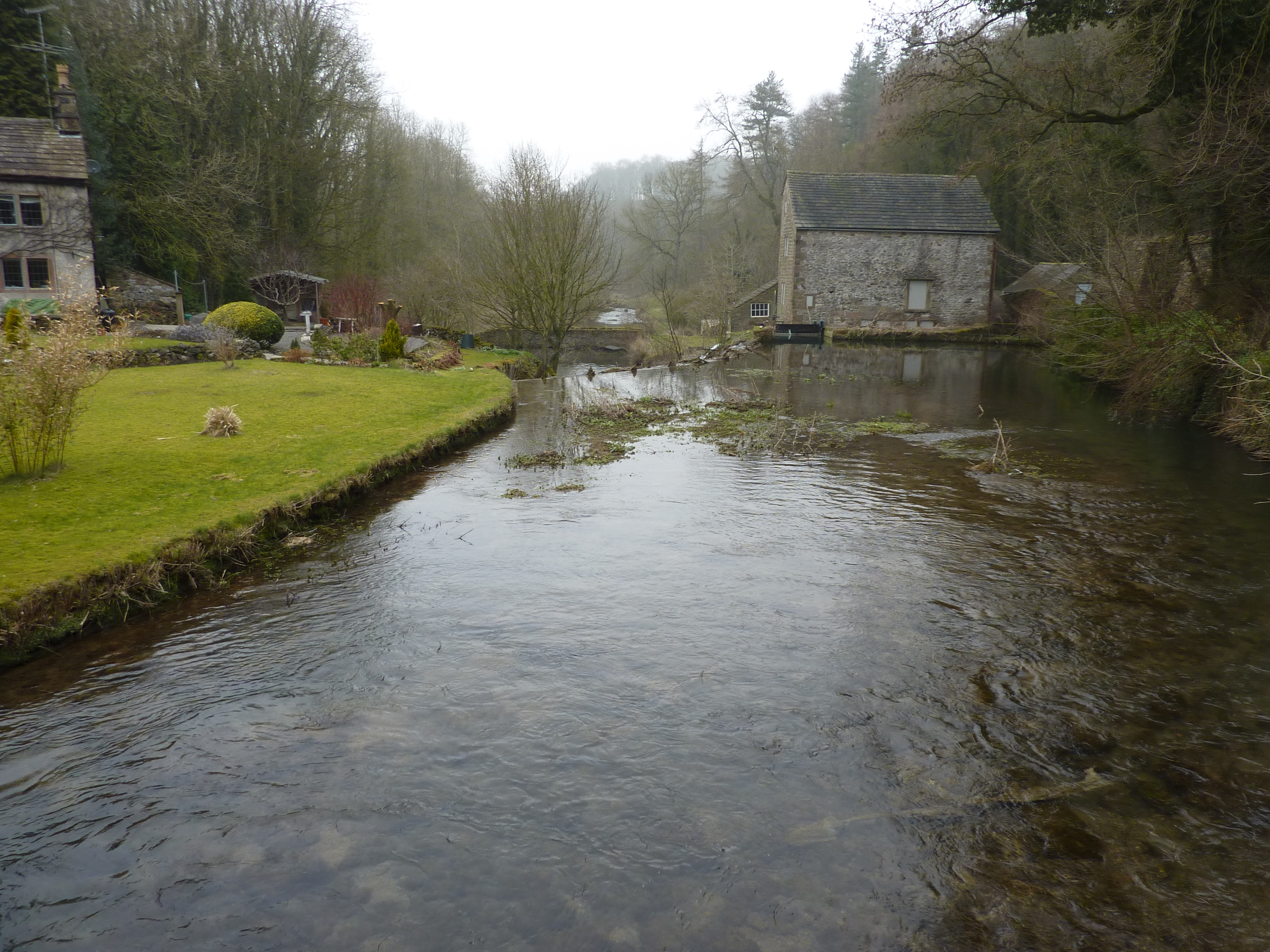
- Alport Mill

- Location within Derbyshire
- Interactive map of Harthill
- Area: 1.44 sq mi (3.7 km^{2})
- Population: 48 (2021)
  - Density: 33/sq mi (13/km^{2})
- OS grid reference: SK 225636
  - London: 130 mi (210 km) SE
- District: Derbyshire Dales
- Shire county: Derbyshire
- Region: East Midlands
- Country: England
- Sovereign state: United Kingdom
- Post town: BAKEWELL
- Postcode district: DE45
- Dialling code: 01629
- Police: Derbyshire
- Fire: Derbyshire
- Ambulance: East Midlands
- UK Parliament: Derbyshire Dales

Harthill is a civil parish within the Derbyshire Dales district, in the county of Derbyshire, England. Largely rural, along with parts of the neighbouring Youlgreave parish, in the 2021 census Harthill had a population of 48. It is 128 miles (206 km) north west of London, 18 1/2 miles (29.8 km) north west of the county city of Derby, and 3 miles (4.8 km) south east of the nearest market town of Bakewell. Harthill is wholly within the Peak District national park, and touches the parishes of Birchover, Elton, Gratton, Nether Haddon, Stanton and Youlgreave. There are eight listed buildings in Harthill.

== Geography ==
=== Location ===
Harthill is surrounded by the following local areas:

- Bakewell and Haddon Hall to the north
- Elton to the south
- Birchover and Stanton to the east
- Alport, Middleton and Youlgreave to the west.

The parish is roughly bounded by the various streams except in the south which follows the edge of Harthill Moor. This area lies in the central north of the Derbyshire Dales district and north west in Derbyshire county. The core of the hamlet is in the north of the parish, Other than private driveways and the B5056 road, there are two lanes within the whole of the parish. The settlement of Alport along its outer edge is considered to cross into the parish. Harthill is predominantly an agricultural area, interspersed by farms and occasional residential dwellings. It is recorded as being a deserted medieval village as it contained more residences in medieval times. Harthill is completely within the Peak District National Park.

=== Environment ===
==== Landscape and geology ====
Primarily farm and pasture land throughout the parish outside the sparsely populated areas, there are some small forestry plots throughout, with a stretch by Harthill Hall in the north, and more woodlands in the moor to the south. Limestone and lead feature in the geology of the wider area.

==== Water features ====
The rivers Lathkill and Bradford forms the parish boundary to the north and west, a tributary the Bleakley Dyke is to the south west. The Ivy Bar Brook is the east edge of the parish.

==== Land elevation ====
The parish can be hilly and undulating in places. The lowest point is along the east boundary along the Ivy Bar brook at ~133 metres (436 ft), The hamlet is 150–175 metres (492–574 ft), while the parish peak is along the south west boundary within Harthill Moor at 249 metres (817 ft).

== History ==
=== Toponymy ===
Harthill was recorded in Domesday as Hortel and Hortil. It was alternatively known by the 1800s as Hartle. The prefix is from hart (deer).

=== Heritage ===
This is evidence of Bronze, Iron and Ice Age human occupation in the parish, such as the Nine Stones stone circle, as well as the Derbyshire Portway which was a notable trading route possibly predating the Romans. Later features include Castle Ring camp which was a Roman fort, and a man-made tumulus, both within Harthill Moor. Harthill was two separate manors in 1066 at the time of the Domesday survey, one of which was held by Ralph FitzHubert. It later descended in the later 12th century to the family of de Herthill who have been presumed to have been related to FitzHubert.

There was formerly a chantry chapel at Harthill, which was founded in the year 1259 by Richard de Herthill, on instructions from a papal bull from Pope Alexander II. The minister of the chapel was appointed and supported by the dean and chapter of Lichfield. Records show the site may have been also used as a courthouse amongst a possible small village. The chapel was recorded as not in use by 1546 for religious purposes.

Harthill was listed in 1334 as associated to the nearby location of Winster together in the High Peak hundred for lay subsidy records. The Herthill family through marriage, along with several other estates, brought Harthill to the Cockayne family during the 14th century. Harthill Hall possibly dates to the Norman Conquest, but was substantially built in the 16th century. By 1577 Christopher Saxton's Derbyshire map only shows the hall with a park, and it is likely any remains of Harthill village lay beneath the hall and the remainder turned into parkland. Edward Cokayne sold Herthill in 1599, to John Manners whose family eventually became members of the Duke of Rutland. In 1891, the then Duke was being reported in journals of the time as being Lord of the manor, and with Major Michael McCreagh-Thornhill from Stanton-in-the-Peak were key local landowners. By the end of the 20th century, the hall had been substantially refurbished, many of its outhouses including the 13th century chapel converted to self-catering holiday accommodation.

=== Industry ===
As well as the regularised agricultural roles because of its rural location, primarily for pasture farming, the area has also supported lead mining with several sites throughout the parish, including Blythe mine and Broadmeadow, the present farm buildings being offices for the mining company in the 1800s. Other industries included lead smelting at Alport Smelt Mill to the very north of the parish alongside the Lathkill river, which was in use between 1845 and 1875 and the operations controlled by the Barker and Rose families. Remains include flues, furnaces, chimneys, slag heaps and other features. Quarrying of stone also took place in the vicinity. Flour was refined further south downstream at a millhouse, also utilising the river as a power source, the site in use since the 12th century.

== Governance and demography ==
=== Population ===
There were 126 residents recorded within Harthill (and Alport) for the 2011 census. In the 2021 census, Harthill alone reported 48 residents.

=== Council administration ===
Because of its small population, Harthill is managed at the first level of public administration via parish meetings, and so there is no parish council.

At district level, the wider area is overseen by Derbyshire Dales district council. Derbyshire County Council provides the highest level strategic services locally.

== Community and leisure ==
=== Tourism ===
There are a number of holiday lodges and campsites throughout catering particularly to Peak District visitors. Several landmarks and historic locations appealing to tourists are scattered throughout the wider area. The long distance Peak District walking route Limestone Way passes from near Birchover to Youlgreave, diagonally crossing the parish.

== Landmarks ==
=== Listed buildings ===
There are eight listed structures within the parish, all at Grade II designation, including Alport Mill, two bridges and several residences.

=== Local monuments ===
The wider region is known for a wide range of historical artefacts, and Harthill has a number of prehistoric and Roman locations spread throughout the parish.

==== Robin Hood's Stride ====
This is a gritstone rock outcrop on a ridge between Harthill Moor and the Alport-Winster road. Legend is that Robin strode between the tower-like stones at either end of the tor, but this is unlikely because they are 15 metres apart and ascending the rocks is difficult, particularly the southern one. The rocks are known by an alternative local name 'Mock Beggar's Hall'.

==== Castle Ring fort ====
Nearby Harthill Moor Farm, is the site of Castle Ring, an Iron Age fort. This is one of the forts built along the ancient track known as the Portway, which passed just alongside Robin Hood's Stride.

==== The Nine stones ====
This is the most visible monument in the area, a stone circle known as the Nine Stones, although only four are standing. This is another Bronze Age monument connected with the Portway.

==== Cratcliff Rocks ====
Just to the north-east lies Cratcliff Tor, a crag which is composed of huge blocks of gritstone and largely hidden by trees. It also contains a hermit's cave, hidden by a group of yew trees. This was probably inhabited around the 12th century and contains a crucifix carved out of the wall of the cave - which is in a well-preserved condition considering its age.

==== The Portway ====
This ancient way pre-dates Roman occupation in the area. It runs roughly south-east to north-west through the parish. Elton Lane within the parish was much of the route, but it then branched off near Harthill Moor farm and passed in-between the Nine Stones stone circle and Robin Hood Stride location. The Anglo-Saxons referred to it as `Port-weg’ – `port’ meaning a market town, so the Portway was `the road to the market’. Sections of it were used by pack-horse teams until the 19th century, and nearby Alport (then Auld-Port) was a significant staging and trading post along the route.

==== Tumulus ====
There are records of a handful of sites throughout the Harthill Moor area in the south of the parish, along with several artefacts found.
