= Alport =

Hamlet in Derbyshire, England

Coordinates: 53.178°N 01.670°W

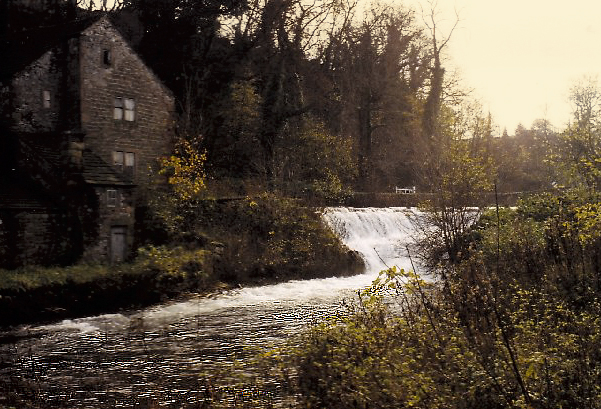
- River Lathkill at the millpond, Alport.

- Location within Derbyshire
- OS grid reference: SK2264
- Civil parish: Youlgreave
- District: Derbyshire Dales
- Shire county: Derbyshire
- Region: East Midlands
- Country: England
- Sovereign state: United Kingdom
- Police: Derbyshire
- Fire: Derbyshire
- Ambulance: East Midlands

Alport is a hamlet in the White Peak area of Derbyshire, England. It lies east of Youlgreave, at the confluence of the River Bradford and the River Lathkill. The oldest house in the hamlet is Monks Hall. There also used to be a pub, which was demolished thanks the construction of a main road, which leads to the A6 and towards Buxton.

A Grade-II listed stone bridge crosses the River near the centre of the hamlet, close to the 18th century mill.

There are lead mines in the area, and at the Alport mine, an early steam-powered Nutating disc engine was installed.

In chronostratigraphy, the British sub-stage of the Carboniferous period, the 'Alportian' derives its name from study of a core from a borehole drilled at Alport.

The name Alport means "Old town", possibly with market trading connotations. The hamlet lies on the line of the Derbyshire Portway, an ancient trading route.

== Governance ==
Alport is within the civil parish of Youlgreave which, in turn, is part of the Derbyshire Dales district.

== See also ==
- Derbyshire lead mining history
- Alport Height near Wirksworth, Derbyshire
- Alport Castles in the High Peak Estate
- Listed buildings in Harthill, Derbyshire
- Listed buildings in Youlgreave
