= All Saints' Church, Youlgreave =

All Saints’ Church, Youlgreave
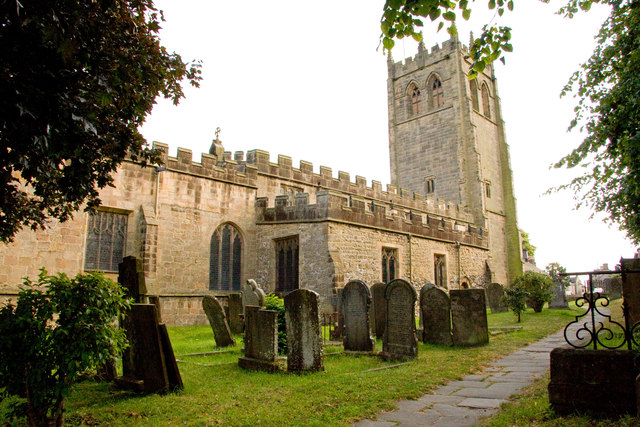
- All Saints’ Church, Youlgreave
- All Saints’ Church, Youlgreave
- 53°10′34.63″N 1°41′2.31″W
- OS grid reference: SK 21205 64372
- Location: Youlgreave
- Country: England
- Denomination: Church of England

History
- Dedication: All Saints

Architecture
- Heritage designation: Grade I listed

Administration
- Diocese: Diocese of Derby
- Archdeaconry: Chesterfield
- Deanery: Bakewell and Eyam
- Parish: Youlgreave and Middleton

All Saints’ Church, Youlgreave is a Grade I listed parish church in the Church of England in Youlgreave, Derbyshire.

== History ==
The church dates from the late 12th century, with 14th-, 15th- and 16th-century elements. It was restored between 1869 and 1870 by Richard Norman Shaw. The roofs were completed renewed. A new east window was inserted in the chancel, designed by the Birmingham Pre-Raphaelite artist Edward Burne-Jones. The floor of the chancel was raised and laid with encaustic tiles interspersed with bands of stone. The rest of the church was paved with tiles and new heating was installed. The organ was moved to the south aisle, and the old pews were replaced with oak seating. The restoration cost £5,100.

== Memorials ==
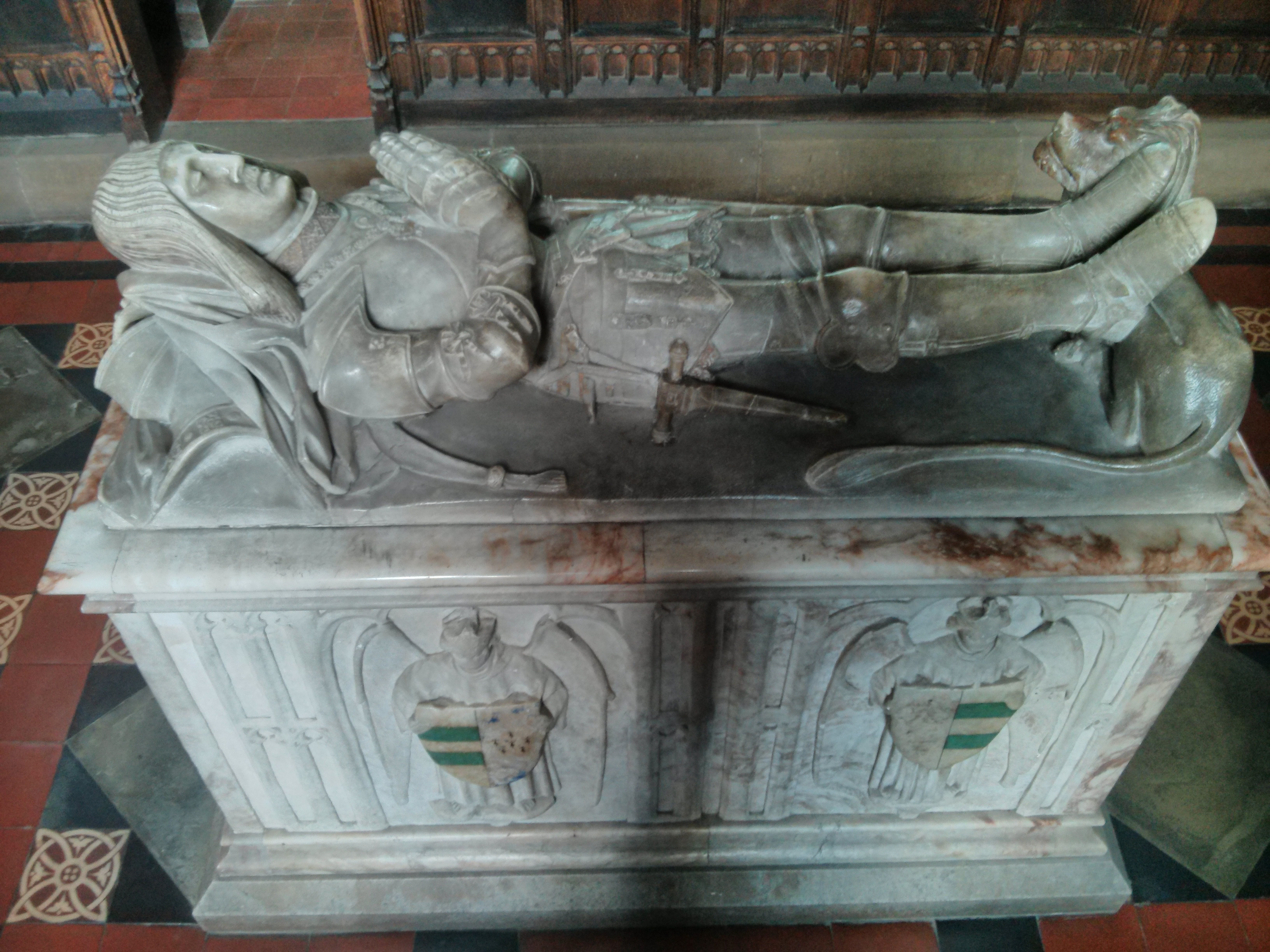
Memorial to Thomas Cockayne (d. 1488)

- Rogerus Rooe (d. 1613)
- Robert and Julia Gilbert
- Carolius Greaves (d. 1729)
- Thomas Cockayne (d. 1488)

== Parish status ==
The church is in a joint parish with

- Holy Trinity Church, Stanton-in-Peak
- St Michael's Church, Birchover
- St Michael and All Angels’ Church, Middleton-by-Youlgreave

== Organ ==
The church contains an organ by Kirtland and Jardine. The original instrument, comprising two manuals and 16 stops was opened on 15 April 1863. It was renovated in 1873 by Jardine of Manchester. A specification of the organ can be found on the National Pipe Organ Register.

== See also ==
- Grade I listed churches in Derbyshire
- Grade I listed buildings in Derbyshire
- Listed buildings in Youlgreave
