= Harthill =

Harthill may refer to:

- Harthill, Cheshire
- Harthill, Derbyshire
- Harthill, Scotland, on the border of North Lanarkshire and West Lothian
- Harthill, South Yorkshire
- Harthill Wapentake a former wapentake in the East Riding of Yorkshire
