= Over Haddon =

Village in Derbyshire, England

Coordinates: 53.195°N 1.696°W

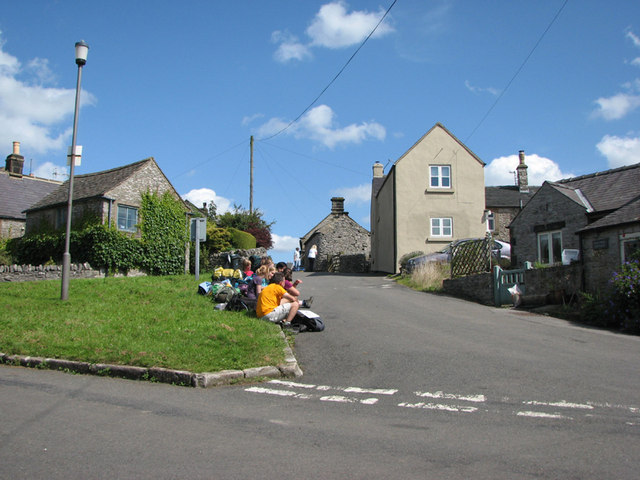
- Over Haddon

- Location within Derbyshire
- Population: 255 (2011)
- OS grid reference: SK204664
- District: Derbyshire Dales
- Shire county: Derbyshire
- Region: East Midlands
- Country: England
- Sovereign state: United Kingdom
- Post town: BAKEWELL
- Postcode district: DE45
- Police: Derbyshire
- Fire: Derbyshire
- Ambulance: East Midlands

Over Haddon is a small village and civil parish in Derbyshire, England. The population of the civil parish (including Nether Haddon) at the 2011 Census was 255. It is near the small town of Bakewell, south of the B5055 road.

Over Haddon overlooks Lathkill Dale and the River Lathkill, which may be crossed by a clapper bridge on a footpath running south from the village. The bridge may be medieval. The village has two churches, a public house, and a car park. Around the year 1667 Over Haddon was home to Martha Taylor, one of the earliest documented examples of a fasting girl, who claimed to be able to survive for months without food.

== Etymology ==
The name "Haddon" means "Heath Hill", the "Over" referring to being above "Nether Haddon" (Haddon Hall).

== History ==
The site of a deserted medieval village, Conksbury, is on the south bank of the River Lathkill, between Over Haddon and Youlgreave, the village was abandoned during the Black Death.

Over Haddon is the birthplace of Maurice Oldfield, a former head of MI6 and reputedly the inspiration for both John le Carré's George Smiley and 'M' in the James Bond books. He died in 1981 and is buried in the village.

== See also ==
- Listed buildings in Over Haddon
