= Listed buildings in Rowsley =

Rowsley is a civil parish in the Derbyshire Dales district of Derbyshire, England. The parish contains 22 listed buildings that are recorded in the National Heritage List for England. Of these, three are listed at Grade II*, the middle of the three grades, and the others are at Grade II, the lowest grade. The parish contains the village of Rowsley and the surrounding area. All the listed buildings are in the village, and include houses and cottages, a church and associated structures, a road bridge, a railway viaduct, embankment and bridge, a hotel and its former stables, a former toll house, a school, a drinking fountain, a former railway station, a lamp standard, a water-powered flour mill, and a war memorial.

== Key ==
Grade	Criteria
II*	Particularly important buildings of more than special interest
II	Buildings of national importance and special interest

== Buildings ==
Name and location	Photograph	Date	Notes	Grade
Rowsley Bridge; 53.18948°N 1.61732°W		15th century	The bridge, which was widened in 1682 and in 1925–26, carries Dale Road North (A6 road) over the River Derwent. It is in sandstone and consists of five arches, pointed on the east side, and segmental on the west side. The cutwaters are triangular with stepped sloping tops, and the parapets are coped and contain an inscribed and dated stone.	II*
Holly House and The Beeches; 53.18901°N 1.61940°W	—	17th century	A manor house extended in the early 18th century, and later divided into two houses. The building is in sandstone with quoins and a stone slate roof with coped gables. There are two storeys and attics, an L-shaped plan, with a rear wing and a front of three irregular bays. The doorway has a massive initialled and dated lintel and jambs, and most of the windows are mullioned.	II
Stables, Peacock Hotel; 53.18944°N 1.61864°W	—	17th century	The stables, later used for other purposes, are in sandstone with quoins and a stone slate roof. There are two storeys and six bays. They contain garage openings with quoined surrounds, a doorway with a plain surround, and recessed mullioned windows.	II
Sycamore Cottage and Vicarage Cottage; 53.18852°N 1.61870°W	—	17th century	A pair of sandstone cottages with quoins and a Welsh slate roof. There are two storeys and six irregular bays. The windows are mullioned, some are flush and some are recessed.	II
The Peacock Hotel; 53.18918°N 1.61833°W		1652	The hotel is in sandstone on a chamfered plinth, with quoins, floor bands, and a stone slate roof with coped gables and plain kneelers. There are two storeys and attics, an L-shaped plan, and a symmetrical front of five bays, the outer pairs of bays gabled. In the centre is a square two-storey porch, with a semicircular step leading up to a doorway with a moulded architrave and a semicircular pediment with a tympanum containing a name and the date. At the top is an embattled parapet and the name of the hotel, over which is a carved peacock. The windows in the lower floors are mullioned and transomed, in the attics they are mullioned, and in the centre of the roof is a gabled dormer.	II*
Beech House and Dye Cottage; 53.18865°N 1.61667°W	—	Early 19th century	A pair of sandstone cottages with a tile roof. There are two storeys and three irregular bays. There are two doorways, one with a quoined surround, and the windows are a mix of casements and mullioned windows.	II
Bridge House Farmhouse; 53.18898°N 1.61762°W		Early 19th century	The farmhouse is in sandstone with quoins and a stone slate roof. There are two storeys and four bays, angled in the centre. The central doorway has a moulded bracketed hood, there is one small-pane casement window, and the other windows are sashes.	II
Ivy House and Bank House; 53.18861°N 1.61899°W	—	Early 19th century	A house that was later divided, it is in sandstone with quoins, and a stone slate roof with coped gables and moulded kneelers. There are two storeys, an L-shaped plan, and a front of three bays. Above the central doorway is a re-set dated and initialled stone, and the windows are sashes.	II
Toll cottage 53.18883°N 1.61997°W	—	Early 19th century	The former toll house is in sandstone with quoins, and a stone slate roof with coped gables and moulded kneelers. There is a single storey and two bays. The windows are recessed, chamfered and mullioned, with two triangular-headed lights. On the left front is a porch with a Tudor arched doorway.	II
Vernon House; 53.18880°N 1.61826°W	—	Early 19th century	A sandstone house with quoins, and a tile roof with coped gables and moulded kneelers. There are two storeys, an L-shaped plan, and a symmetrical front of three bays, with a central doorway and sash windows.	II
Wye Bridge House; 53.18805°N 1.61559°W	—	Early 19th century (probable)	A sandstone house that has a stone slate roof with coped gables and moulded kneelers. There are two storeys, and a west front of five irregular bays, the third and fourth bays gabled. On the front are two doorways, one with a bracketed hood, the windows are mullioned, and in the upper floor is a recessed square panel with a sundial.	II
Wye Cottage; 53.18823°N 1.61625°W	—	Early 19th century	The cottage is in sandstone with a stone slate roof. There are two storeys and one bay. The windows are recessed, chamfered and mullioned, and contain two cast iron casements with Gothic glazing. To the left is a gabled timber porch and a doorway.	II
Village school, wall and lavatories 53.18835°N 1.61667°W		1840	The school and master's house, now incorporated into the school, is in sandstone with chamfered quoins, and a tile roof with coped gables and moulded kneelers. On the roof is a loured bell turret with a pyramidal roof. The school is in one and two storeys, and has a cruciform plan. The windows are mullioned or mullioned and transomed, and there is a doorway with a Tudor arch. An attached wall links to a lavatory block, later used for other purposes, that has a Welsh slate roof, a louvred ventilator, and four doorways divided by brick piers.	II
Drinking fountain 53.18896°N 1.61858°W	—	1841	The drinking fountain consists of a half-domed alcove enclosed by a round-headed arch with a vermiculated and rusticated surround. Inside the alcove is a moulded oval trough and a cast iron lion's head for the tap, and over the head of the arch is a crown.	II
Rowsley Old Station; 53.19054°N 1.61414°W		1849	The station was designed by Joseph Paxton for the Manchester, Buxton, Matlock and Midland Junction Railway in Italianate style. It is in stone and has a slate roof and deep bracketed eaves. There is a single storey, and it contains four semicircular-headed windows, one blocked, and two doorways with segmental fanlights.	II
1 and 2 Midland Cottages; 53.18899°N 1.61325°W	—	1850	A pair of cottages designed by Joseph Paxton for the Midland Railway in Italianate style. They are in stone with a slate roof, two storeys and four bays. At the rear is an outshut with a hipped roof. The windows are sashes with sills on corbels, those in the ground floor with arched heads on impost blocks. In each gable end is a porch with a flat hood on carved brackets with pendentives.	II
Lychgate and steps, St Katherine's Church; 53.19102°N 1.62064°W		Mid 19th century	The base of the lychgate consists of two parallel sandstone walls with vermiculation and chamfered coping. The superstructure is in timber, with a hipped tile roof, and the gates are wooden. Leading up to the lychgate is a broad flight of seven stone steps flanked by curved stone walls with chamfered copings and end piers, and then a further five steps.	II
Railway viaduct, embankment and overbridge 53.19031°N 1.61846°W		1851–52	The viaduct, embankment and bridge were built to carry the Rowsley to Buxton extension of the Midland Railway over the River Derwent, and are in gritstone. The viaduct is slightly curved, and consists of four semicircular arches on rectangular piers rising from rounded cutwaters. At the top is a shallow parapet with railings over a band. On the north side at each end are abutments with raking buttresses. To the west is an embankment faced with masonry, containing a narrow stilted round-headed archway over a track.	II
St Katherine's Church; 53.19123°N 1.61998°W		1853–55	The north aisle and chapel were added in 1859. The church is in Norman style, and is built in sandstone with a tile roof. It consists of a nave, a north aisle and chapel, a south porch, and a chancel with a vestry and an organ chamber. At the west end is a buttress corbelled out to carry a double bellcote with a colonnette. The south porch is gabled, it has a round-arched entrance with a moulded surround and colonnettes, and above it is a stepped triplet of blind round arches.	II
Lamp standard 53.18900°N 1.61789°W		1867	The lamp standard, in the middle of a road junction, is in sandstone. It has a square base, with a curved top and an inscription, on which is a tapering shaft with chamfered angles, about 6 feet (1.8 m) high. There is an inscribed metal plaque on the east side, and on the top is a cast iron lamp with scrolled sides.	II
Caudwells Mill; 53.18822°N 1.61876°W		1874–75	A water-powered flour mill built over a mill race, later a museum, is in sandstone with a Welsh slate roof. There are three storeys, a front of seven bays, and twin semicircular arches over the mill race. The windows have iron frames. On the north gable end is a projecting enclosed hoist, and a large timber and corrugated iron canopy. At the south gable end is a lower gabled bay.	II*
War Memorial; 53.19096°N 1.62019°W		c. 1920	The war memorial in the churchyard of St Katherine's Church is in sandstone, and in the form of a Saxon cross. There is a rectangular base of two steps, on which is a tall tapering plinth, and a tall cross, with interlace and other decoration on the north face. On the plinth are inscriptions relating to the two World Wars.	II
