= Harthill Hall =

Country house in Harthill, Derbyshire, England

Coordinates: 53°10′42.55″N 1°39′31.32″W

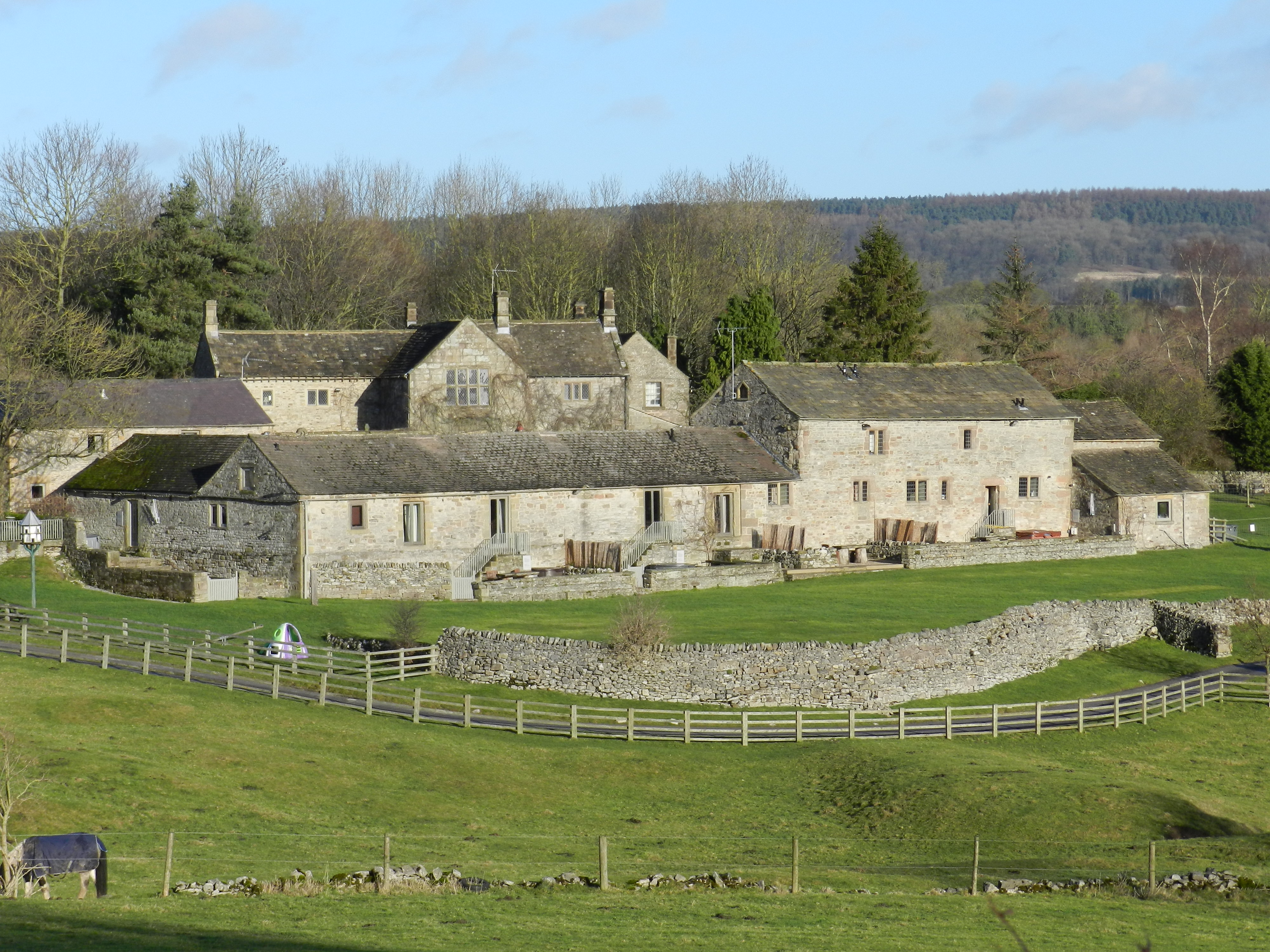
Harthill Hall

Harthill Hall was formerly the Manor House of a great 13th century Estate, and the hall is now a Grade II listed building within the civil parish of Harthill, near Bakewell, Derbyshire, England. The Manor itself is the main house of Harthill Hall and was constructed in the 16th century. The site also features the chapel, which was the original 14th-century building on the site. It once comprised a stable block, brewery and an inn.

The Manor has retained many original features such as its stone flagged floors, oak-paneled four poster bedrooms, mullioned leaded windows, ancient carved oak doors and beams throughout. The Manor has recently undergone a mammoth horticultural development to restore its once famous knot garden.

== See also ==
- Listed buildings in Harthill, Derbyshire
