= St Katherine's Church, Rowsley =

St Katherine’s Church, Rowsley
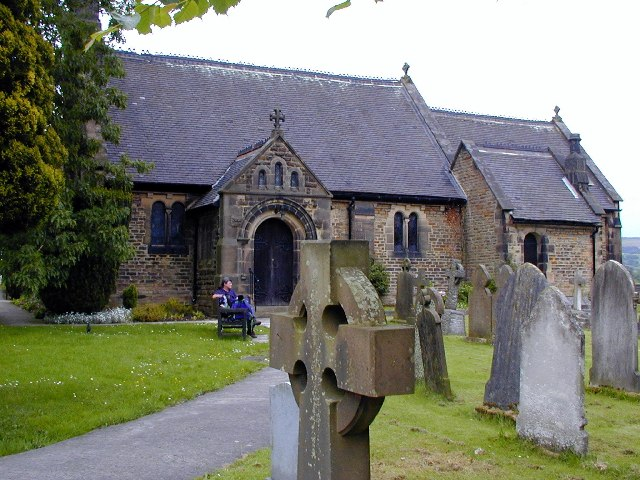
- St Katherine’s Church, Rowsley
- St Katherine’s Church, Rowsley
- 53°11′28.27″N 1°37′11.19″W
- OS grid reference: SK 25489 66078
- Location: Rowsley, Derbyshire
- Country: England
- Denomination: Church of England

History
- Dedication: St Katherine
- Consecrated: 18 July 1855

Architecture
- Heritage designation: Grade II listed
- Architect: Anthony Salvin
- Groundbreaking: 29 May 1854
- Completed: 18 July 1855

Administration
- Province: Canterbury
- Diocese: Derby
- Archdeaconry: Chesterfield
- Deanery: Bakewell & Eyam
- Parish: Rowsley

St Katherine's Church, Rowsley is a Grade II listed parish church in the Church of England in Rowsley, Derbyshire.

== History ==
The foundation stone was laid on 29 May 1854 by John Manners, 7th Duke of Rutland, who laid coins of every value, from a sovereign to half a farthing, in the foundations. The church was built to the designs of the architect Anthony Salvin. It was dedicated to St Catherine, after the name and in honour of the late Lady Manners. The church was consecrated by the Bishop of Lichfield on 18 July 1855.

In 1862 a mortuary chapel was erected to contain a monument erected to the late Lady John Manners, the first wife of John Manners, 7th Duke of Rutland. The figures were carved of white statuary, the columns of russet marble, and the other portions of Darley Dale stone. It was executed under the superintendence of Anthony Salvin, the figure executed by William Calder Marshall, and the sculpture and architectural part of the monument by J. Forsyth of Hemsptead Road, London. The floor was inlaid with marble mosaics displaying the circle and the cross.

== Parish status ==
The church is in a joint parish with:

- All Saints’ Church, Bakewell
- Holy Trinity Church, Ashford-in-the-Water
- St Anne's Church, Over Haddon
- St Michael and All Angels' Church, Sheldon

== Stained glass ==
The east window, designed by T. Willamont of London, was inserted in 1855 in memory of Catherine Louisa Georgiana Manners (28 January 1831 - 7 April 1854), the first wife of John Manners, 7th Duke of Rutland.

== Organ ==
An organ was installed in 1863 by Kirtland and Jardine of Manchester. A specification of the organ can be found on the National Pipe Organ Register.

== See also ==
- Listed buildings in Rowsley
