= Hart Hill, Kent =

Protected area in Kent, England

Coordinates: 51.222°N 0.780°E

Hart Hill
- Site of Special Scientific Interest
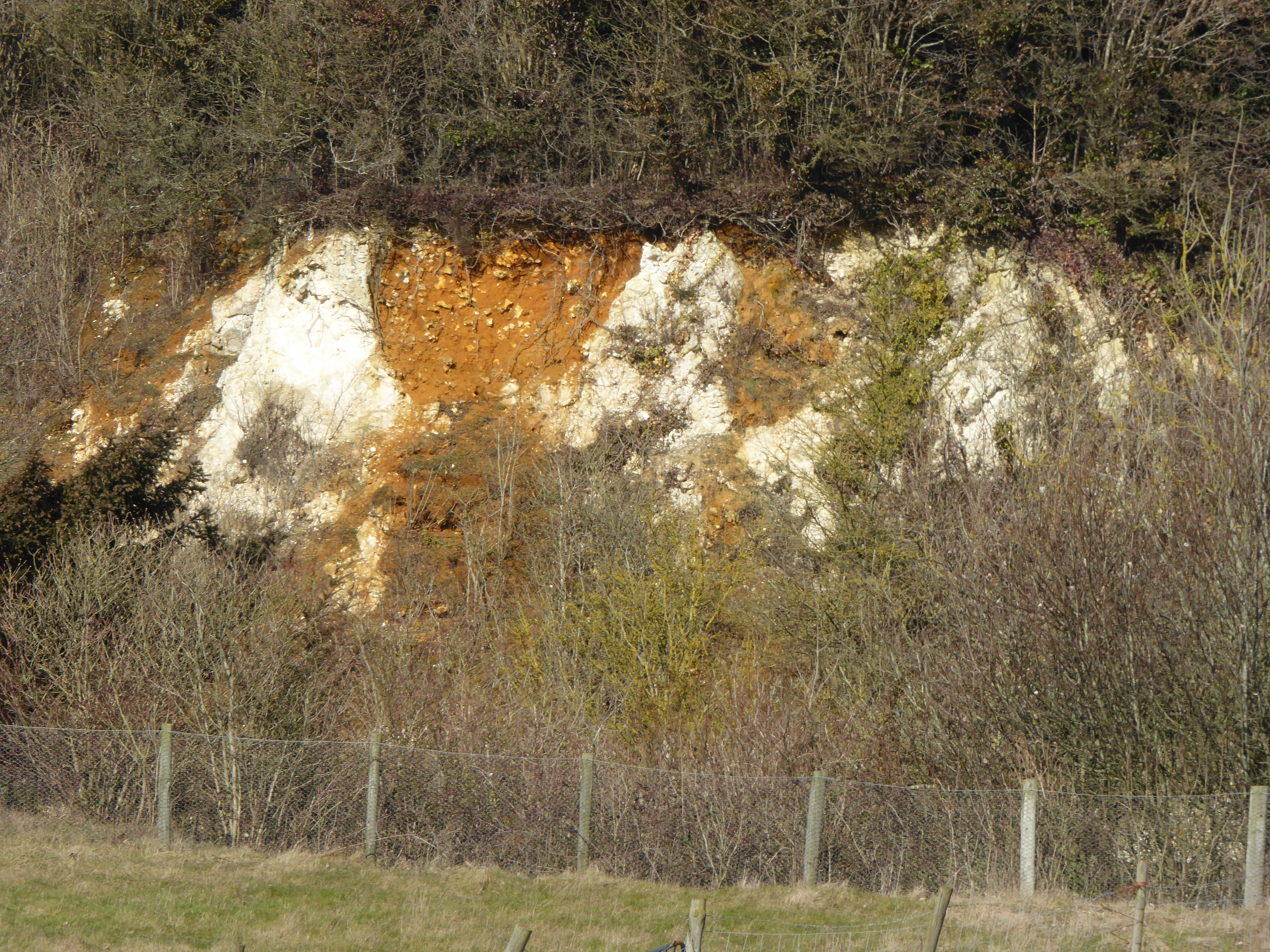
- Location of Hart Hill.
- Area of search: Kent
- Grid reference: TQ 942 506
- Interest: Geological
- Area: 1.4 hectares (3.5 acres)
- Notification date: 1992
- Location map: Magic Map

Hart Hill is a 1.4-hectare (3.5-acre) geological Site of Special Scientific Interest north-west of Charing Kent. It is a Geological Conservation Review site.

This site is controversial as it exposes the Lenham Beds, the date of which has been disputed, but they are now thought to be Pliocene, on the basis of their marine bivalves and gastropods.

There is no access to the site, which has been built on, but geology is visible from the Pilgrims' Way.
