= River Bradford =

Coordinates: 53°10′36″N 1°40′20″W

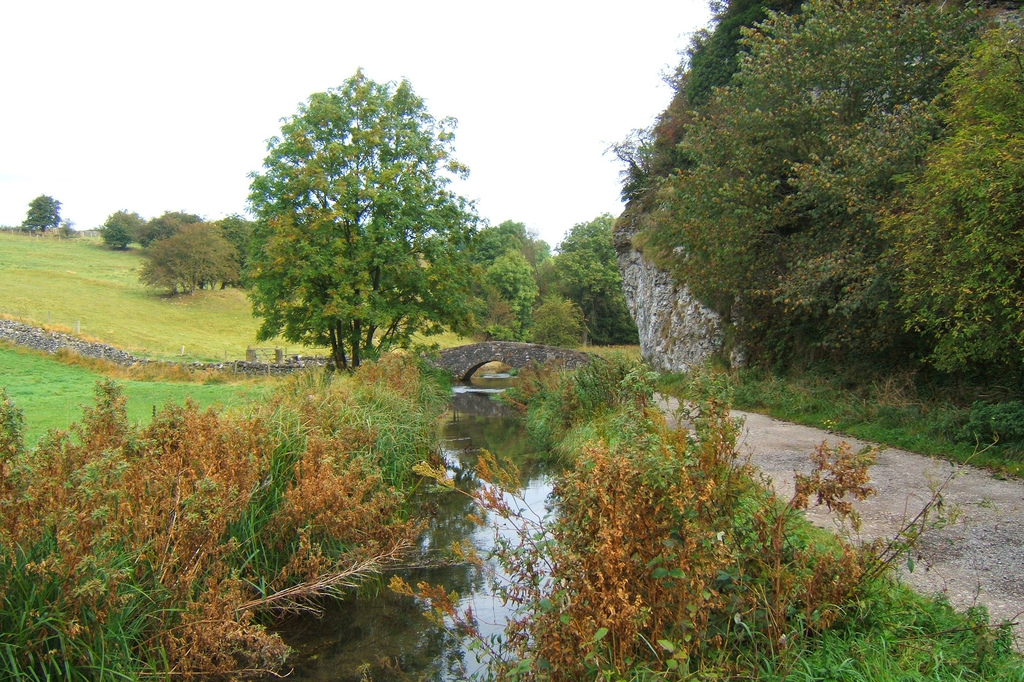
- Bradford Dale

Location
- Country: England

Physical characteristics
- Source
  - location: Gratton Moor
- Mouth
  - location: River Lathkill

The River Bradford is a river in the Peak District National Park in Derbyshire. Its source is on Gratton Moor and after passing below Youlgreave it joins the River Lathkill at Alport. A little over 4 miles (7 km) in length, its waters are very clear due to the limestone rock over which it flows, and its course has been widened by a number of weirs which encourage white-throated dippers to breed in the ponds created. The river is owned and managed by the Haddon Estate and is home to brown trout and white-clawed crayfish. The valley is known as Bradford Dale, and the Limestone Way long distance footpath passes through it.

== Course ==
The river rises towards the lower end of Gratton Dale, to the south-west of Gratton Lane at Dale End. It is called Rowlow Brook, and is ephemeral, with the point at which water appears in the channel varying with the amount of rainfall. It passes under the road at Dale End, and then back again to enter Fishpond Wood, where there is a large pond, before it curves around to the north. Larks Low bowl barrow is on the left bank. It dates from the Bronze Age, and is semi-circular in shape, due to agricultural activity destroying some of the original circular earthworks. It was partially excavated in 1825 by William Bateman and Mitchell. The river is crossed by the road to Lowfields Farm and continues northwards to reach Middleton-by-Youlgreave, where it enters another wooded section. An underground spring flows into Rowlow Brook, which is usually taken as marking the beginning of the River Bradford, although the Environment Agency refer to it all as the River Bradford. The spring water flows from a limestone aquifer, and so the water is crystal clear. On the left of the river are the ruined remains of Fulwood's Castle, a short lived fortified house which was built in 1608-1611 by Sir George Fulwood. It passed to Christopher Fulwood in 1624, but he was killed in November 1643 during the English Civil War. The building fell into ruin and was demolished in 1720, with the stonework reused to build a barn and outbuildings at Castle Farm.

The River Bradford beyond the spring is quite wide, due to the presence of six weirs and sluices. After the second weir, the river turns to the east, and skirts the southern edge of Youlgreave. Holywell Lane runs down to the river, and a footbridge enables people to cross. It consists of seven limestone blocks placed in the river, which support five long limestone slabs. The current structure probably dates from the 18th century, but replaced an earlier bridge of a similar construction. It is grade II listed. Below the bridge, another weir creates a wild swimming area. The channel has been deepened by carving out the bedrock, to create a swimming area that is around 66 by 26 feet (20 by 8 m) and up to 5 feet (1.5 m) deep. A little further downstream is a footbridge consisting of two blocks of gritstone placed in the river and a pier constructed of gritstone, with gritstone slabs laid over the top of them. It is closely followed by a road bridge carrying Mawstone Lane, which is constructed of limestone blocks and slabs, but with limestone rubble parapets, added at a later date.

Just after the road bridge, Bleakley Dike joins on the right bank. The dike rises in Bleakley Plantation and flows northwards to enter a "V"-shaped pond, known as Harthill Pond, which has historically been known as Spar Lake, Miners' Lake, and more recently Youlgrave Dam. A second stream flows into the other branch of the "V" from the south-east. There is a sluice on the outlet of the pond, which is labelled Fish Pond on the 1:2500 map. From the pond the dike flows to the north-west to reach the River Bradford. After the junction there is a wide bridge carrying a public right of way, called the Old Coach Road. A former packhorse bridge with a single arch of limestone rubble and gritstone copings crosses the Bradford to the south of the hamlet of Bradford. It dates from the 18th century and is grade II listed. This is followed by five more weirs, a bridge which enables the Old Coach Road to cross back to the left bank with a weir immediately below it, and then the River Lathkill joins on the right bank at Alport. Both rivers flow over a weir, and the combined flow is called the River Lathkill below the junction.

== History ==
Where the river approached Middleton-by-Youlgreave, there were two water-powered mills. The first was at Gooseholme, an area of flat pasture land where the medieval residents of Middleton-by-Youlgreave grazed flocks of geese. This was cleared out in the early 19th century, to create a water supply for a mill. A map dating from the late 1700s shows a mill pond with a small building, which was probably a bobbin mill. The bobbins were made from coppiced wood, and supplied the cottage lace industry in Middleton. In 1839, the mill was bought by John Bradbury Robinson, who made cardboard boxes for pills. He subsequently moved to Chesterfield, which enabled the Robinson's packaging business to expand. By 1880 the building was in use as a tape factory producing red tape which was used to tie up legal documents. It had been converted into a pump house by 1922, to provide a water supply to the village. Remains of the dam, the head and tail races, the wheel pit and two sluices can still be seen. The pumping station was funded by the Bateman family, who lived in Middleton. A turbine pumped water up to the village, but was abandoned when the village was connected to the mains water supply. The turbine was powered by a water wheel located inside the building, which was 12 feet (3.7 m) in diameter, and 8 feet (2.4 m) wide. It pumped water to a reservoir at Middleton Hall, from where the water supplied Middleton Hall, Lomberdale Hall, seven farms and around 27 houses. The water supply decreased in the 1930s, and the water wheel was replaced first by a petrol engine and then by an electric motor. Dates for the developments at this site are tentative, since Gregory suggests that the building was first used for making tape, then pill boxes, followed by bobbins, with production ceasing by the 1850s.

A corn mill at Middleton-by-Youlgreave was mentioned when the Domesday Book was compiled in 1086, although the site of it is unknown. Again, its exact position is unclear, but a corn mill was destroyed by fire in 1733. It was subsequently rebuilt, as the death of the miller William Fletcher, who fell into the machinery, resulted in an inquest being held in 1807. A larger mill replaced that one in 1822, which was pulled down some time before 1914, with the stone being used to construct Castle Cottages. Nearby was a wheelwrights workshop, of which some remains still stand. There are also the remains of a sheepwash below Gooseholme dam. Water entered the main dipping pool through a valve in the dam wall. It probably dates from the 19th century, and continued in use until the 1920s or 1930s, after which it gradually became derelict. The stonework has been restored since 1984.

The river is divided into a series of "dams", a local word used to describe the pond created by an embankment, rather than the embankment that creates the pond. The Haddon Estate, who own the river, refer to them by numbers starting at the furthest downstream, and so the upper dam is called dam #5. This appears to be the one which provided the water supply for the corn mill, although there are six dam structures in total, with the final one between the site of the corn mill and Gooseholme. This was commonly known as Boathouse Dam, as a boat was kept on it by the owners of Middleton Hall, the Waterhouse family. Each of the six dams has a sluice gate with a board which can be raised or lowered to alter water levels within the pond. The lower four dams were created to manage trout within the river for fly fishing, rather than water supplies to the mill. Between Gooseholme and Holywell Lane at Youlgreave, the river bed descends by over 82 feet (25 m), and the weirs account for about half of that drop. Prior to the construction of the dams, this would have resulted in a narrow and fast-flowing river, rather than the wide and slow-moving ponds that characterise the dale. The river was subsequently treated like a fish farm, with stocks of trout delivered by lorry each spring, and little thought given to whether conditions were suitable for them to survive the winters. Warren Slaney, who manages the river for the Haddon Estate, has spent years attempting to return it to a more natural state, so that the fish population becomes self-sustaining, and hence provides food for other creatures throughout the year. This has involved raising the boards on some of the weirs, so that levels in the ponds are lowered, and the river cuts a more natural path through the landscape.

As part of this process, the Wild Trout Trust were asked to assess the state of the river in 2021, with particular attention given to the stretch above Mawstone Lane, although they also looked at the section from Mawstone Lane to the junction with the River Lathkill. They noted that the sluice at the outlet to dam #5 had been open for some time, allowing the river to re-create a channel. There was evidence of flora and fauna becoming established on the former bed of the pond, creating a vegetated flood-plain. The wide and shallow shape of the valley floor means that there is little opportunity for gravel beds to form, suitable for spawning, but there are some sections where the channel narrows, which might result in beds forming. By contrast, dam #4, where the sluice was closed, provided a greater depth of water for adult trout, but the weir prevented the movement of gravels downstream, and prevented the movement of fish upstream. The Wild Trout Trust suggested that the best options for improving the ecology of the river would be to remove the dams, but also recognised that this would be contentious. The next best option would be to open the sluices between the dams, and possibly to construct fish passages to enable fish to move more freely up and down the river. This might be the only option for the public swimming area near Youlgreave. Other improvements could be made by the use of large woody debris within the channel, and the addition of extra gravel at suitable locations for spawning.

== Water quality ==
The Environment Agency assesses the water quality within the river systems in England. Each is given an overall ecological status, which may be one of five levels: high, good, moderate, poor or bad. There are several components that are used to determine this, including biological status, which looks at the quantity and varieties of invertebrates, angiosperms and fish. Chemical status, which compares the concentrations of various chemicals against known safe concentrations, is rated good or fail.

The water quality of the River Bradford catchment including the Rowlow Brook was as follows in 2019/2022:

Section	Ecological Status	Chemical Status	Length	Catchment
Bradford Catchment (trib of Lathkill)	Moderate	Fail	4.4 miles (7.1 km)	12.46 square miles (32.3 km^{2})

In 2016, ecological status was good, but dropped to moderate in 2019 due to the presence of high levels of zinc. Like most rivers in the UK, the chemical status changed from good to fail in 2019, due to the presence of polybrominated diphenyl ethers (PBDE), which had not previously been included in the assessment. The chemical status was also affected by levels of lead and its compounds.

== See also ==
- List of rivers in England
