= Youlgreave =

Village in Derbyshire, England

Coordinates: 53°10′30″N 01°41′13″W

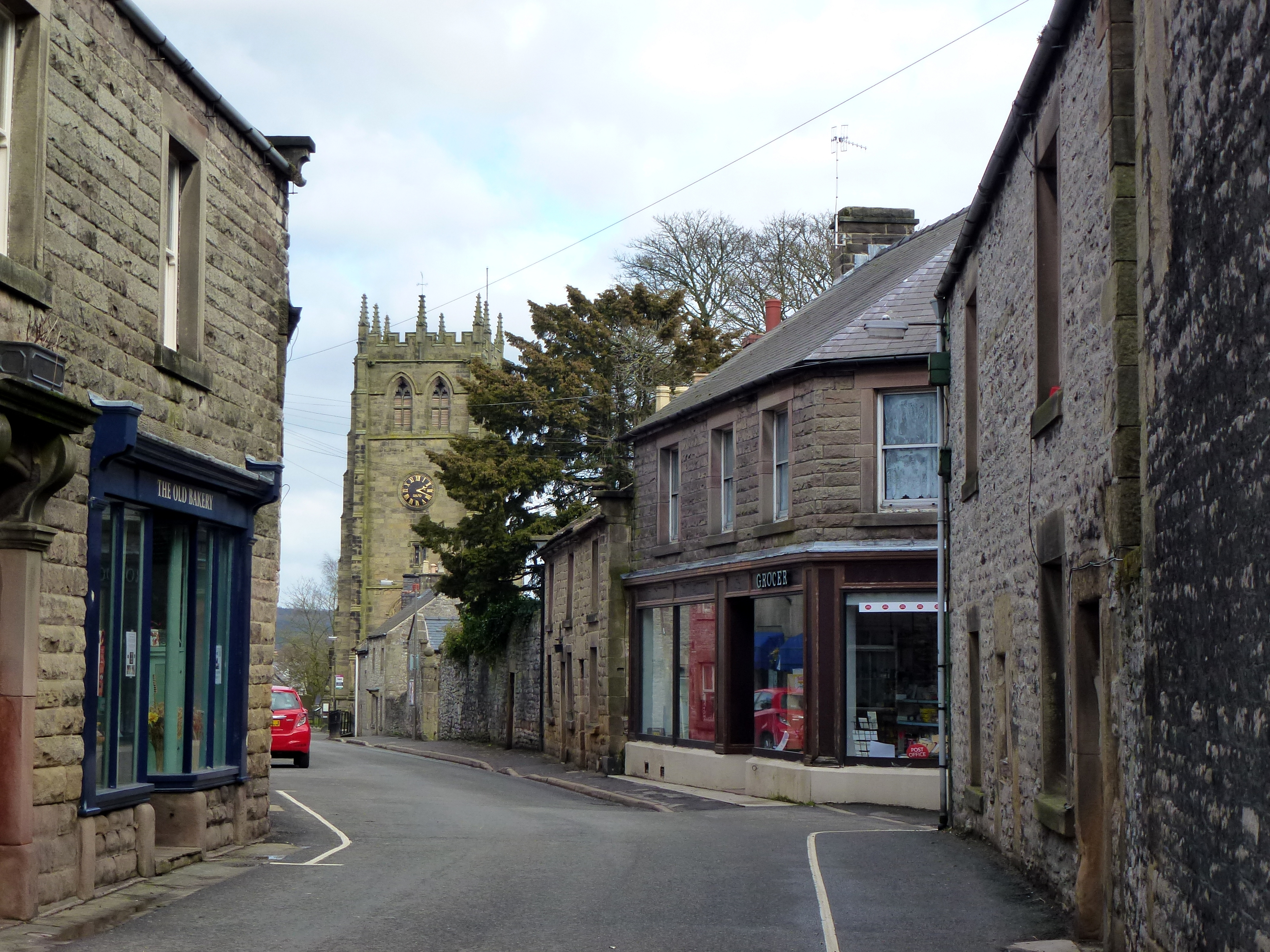
- Youlgreave village centre

- Location within Derbyshire
- Area: 3.93 sq mi (10.2 km^{2})
- Population: 997
  - Density: 254/sq mi (98/km^{2})
- OS grid reference: SK209642
  - London: 133 mi (214 km) SW
- District: Derbyshire Dales
- Shire county: Derbyshire
- Region: East Midlands
- Country: England
- Sovereign state: United Kingdom
- Post town: BAKEWELL
- Postcode district: DE45
- Dialling code: 01629
- Police: Derbyshire
- Fire: Derbyshire
- Ambulance: East Midlands
- UK Parliament: Derbyshire Dales

Youlgreave or Youlgrave is a village and civil parish in the Peak District of Derbyshire, England, on the River Bradford 2 1/2 miles (4.0 km) south of Bakewell. The name possibly derives from "yellow grove", the ore mined locally being yellow in colour. The population in 1991 was 1,256; it is one of the largest villages in the Peak District National Park.

The village has three public houses (the George Hotel, Farmyard Inn and Bull's Head Hotel), and a British Legion club.

== Geography ==
The village is on the B5056 and the parish has an area of 2,515 acres (3.93 sq mi; 1,020 ha). Youlgrave is at an altitude of 600 ft (183 m) located on the southwestern edge of a Carboniferous plateau. It stands on the hillside above the confluence of Lathkill Dale and Bradford Dale. To the east, the geology is shale-like rather than limestone. The area is home to many mineral veins such as fluorspar, galena (lead ore) and calamine (zinc ore).

Three long-distance paths, the Alternative Pennine Way, the Limestone Way and the White Peak Way, pass through the village, swelling the number of walkers.

== History ==
Youlgreave was mentioned in the Domesday Book as belonging to Henry de Ferrers and being worth sixteen shillings.

All Saints' Church, Youlgreave, has a 12th-century font. The main round bowl is carved with decorative motifs, and it has a second small bowl, supported by a salamander corbel. The font was moved to Youlgreave in the 19th century, from the church at Elton. The building is grade I listed.

There are also a number of historic buildings in the village, such as Old Hall Farm (1630), Thimble Hall and The Old Hall (c.1650).

Most of the village's households get their water from Youlgreave Waterworks Limited, one of very few private water companies in Britain. It came about when Youlgreave Friendly Society for Women helped to set up a fund to pipe water from Mawstone springs into the village, terminating at the Grade II listed "Conduit Head" of 1829, in Fountain Square. In the 1930s, as new houses were built and older ones were modernised with bathrooms and toilets, water often became short. In 1932 the main underground pipe cracked after an explosion in Mawstone lead mine. Springs at Harthill were connected to the system in 1949 and other major improvements followed. Most homes in the village could be supplied with local water until there were just too many new houses to cope with. Extra supplies are purchased from larger water companies nowadays.

A Wesleyan Methodist Chapel was erected in 1807 and enlarged to celebrate its centenary in 1907. A Wesleyan Reform Chapel was opened in 1857. A Primitive Methodist Church designed by Henry Harper was opened in 1895 to replace the original chapel of 1822.

In 1932 five of six miners working on a ventilation fan at Mawstone Mine were killed after an explosion filled the gallery with carbon monoxide. The sixth miner was able to reach the surface and raise the alarm. A rescue party of two workers and the mine manager descended into the mine, but were themselves killed by the fumes. Although Mawstone Mine was eventually closed, a water supply for the village is still obtained from this site.

== Tourism ==
Because of its scenic location in the Peak District, Youlgreave is a popular destination for hikers. The Limestone Way passes through Bradford Dale, immediately south of the village. Langley Park School for Boys owns a building in the village, which is used for school trips, students taking part in various local sporting activities and a visit to nearby Alton Towers.

A Guinness World Records Certificate names Thimble Hall in Youlgreave as 'the world's smallest detached house' at 11 feet 10 inches (3.61 m) × 10 ft 3 in (3.12 m) and 12 ft 2 in (3.71 m) high. The property made national headlines in 1999 when sold at auction for £39,500. Each room is less than 8 feet square and there was a fixed ladder to the bedroom, a stone fireplace, exposed beams and exposed floorboards in the bedroom. It was home to a family of eight around a hundred years ago. It was last occupied as a dwelling in the early 1930s and is currently being converted into a craft gallery. It is a Grade II listed building.

The Youlgreave Festival, founded in 2001, offers local artists and musicians a chance to showcase their talents.

There are popular walking paths through the valley following the River Bradford.

== Media ==
Local regional television is provided by BBC East Midlands Today and ITV News Central.

Radio stations that broadcast to Youlgreave are BBC Radio Derby on 95.3 FM, Capital Midlands on 102.8 FM, and Peak FM 102.0 FM.

Youlgreave's local newspapers are the Matlock Mercury and the Derbyshire Times.

== Sport ==
=== Football ===
Youlgreave is home to Youlgrave United Football Club (est. 1886) who currently compete in the Hope Valley Amateur League. Their ground is based on Alport Lane Playing Fields, Youlgreave.

=== Cricket ===
Youlgrave Lodge Cricket Club and ground is based on Alport Lane Playing Fields, Youlgreave. The club have three senior teams: a 1st XI Saturday team that compete in the Yorkshire and Derbyshire Cricket League, a Sunday XI team that play friendly matches in and around the region, and a Midweek XI side.

== Notable people ==
Bill Burgess (1872–1950) was the second person to successfully complete a swim of the English Channel after Matthew Webb. He performed the feat on 6 September 1911, his 16th attempt. He was born in Rotherham to Alfred Burgess, a blacksmith from Youlgreave, and Camilla Anna Peat, a cook from Harthill, South Yorkshire. He spent most of his life in France, and won a bronze medal with the French water polo team at the 1900 Olympics. In 1926 he coached Gertrude Ederle who became the first woman to swim the English Channel.

== See also ==
- Listed buildings in Youlgreave
- Derbyshire lead mining history
