= River Lathkill =

Lathkill
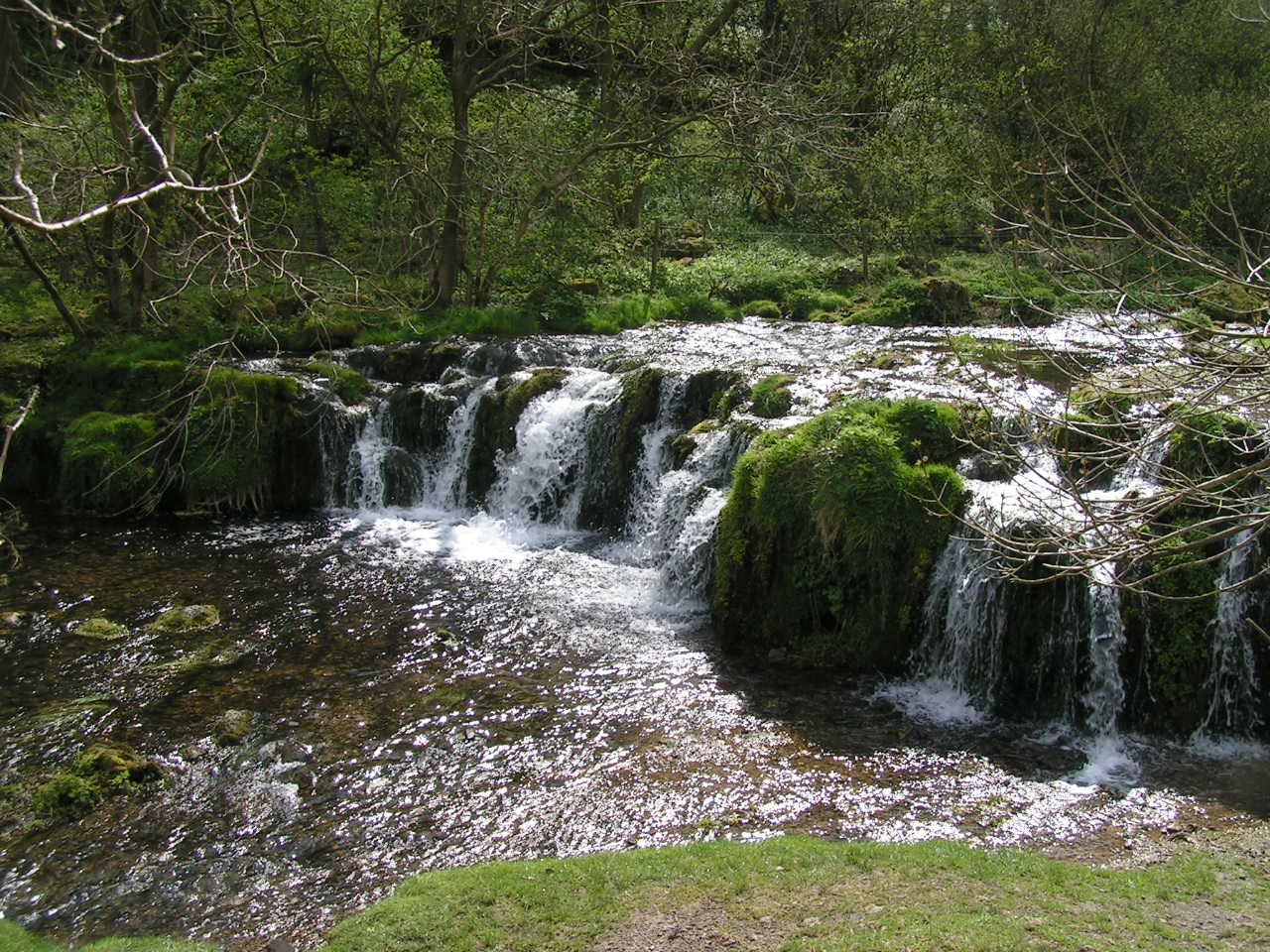
- Tufa dam, River Lathkill

Location
- Country: England
- Counties: Derbyshire

Physical characteristics
- Source
  - location: Lathkill Head nr Monyash
  - coordinates: 53.1895°N 1.7463°W
- Mouth
  - location: River Wye nr Rowsley
  - coordinates: 53.1887°N 1.6392°W
- Length: 10.5 km (6.5 mi)

Basin features
- Tributaries
  - right: River Bradford, Ivy Bar Brook

The River Lathkill is a river in the Peak District National Park in Derbyshire, England.

First recorded in 1280, the name "Lathkill" possibly has Scandinavian roots, the old Norse hlada-kill translating as "narrow valley with a barn".

== Course ==
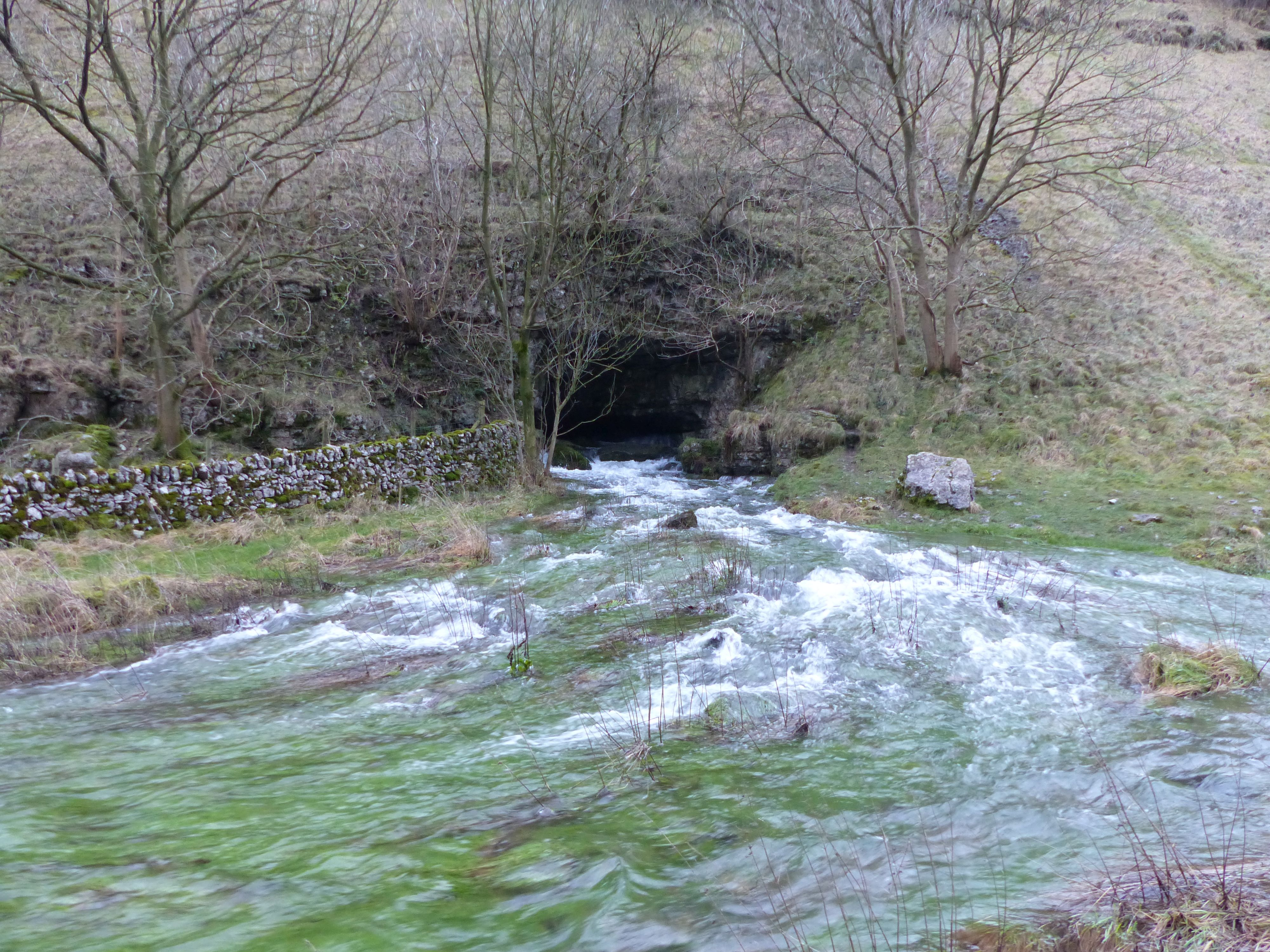
Lathkill Head Cave, the source of the river in wet weather

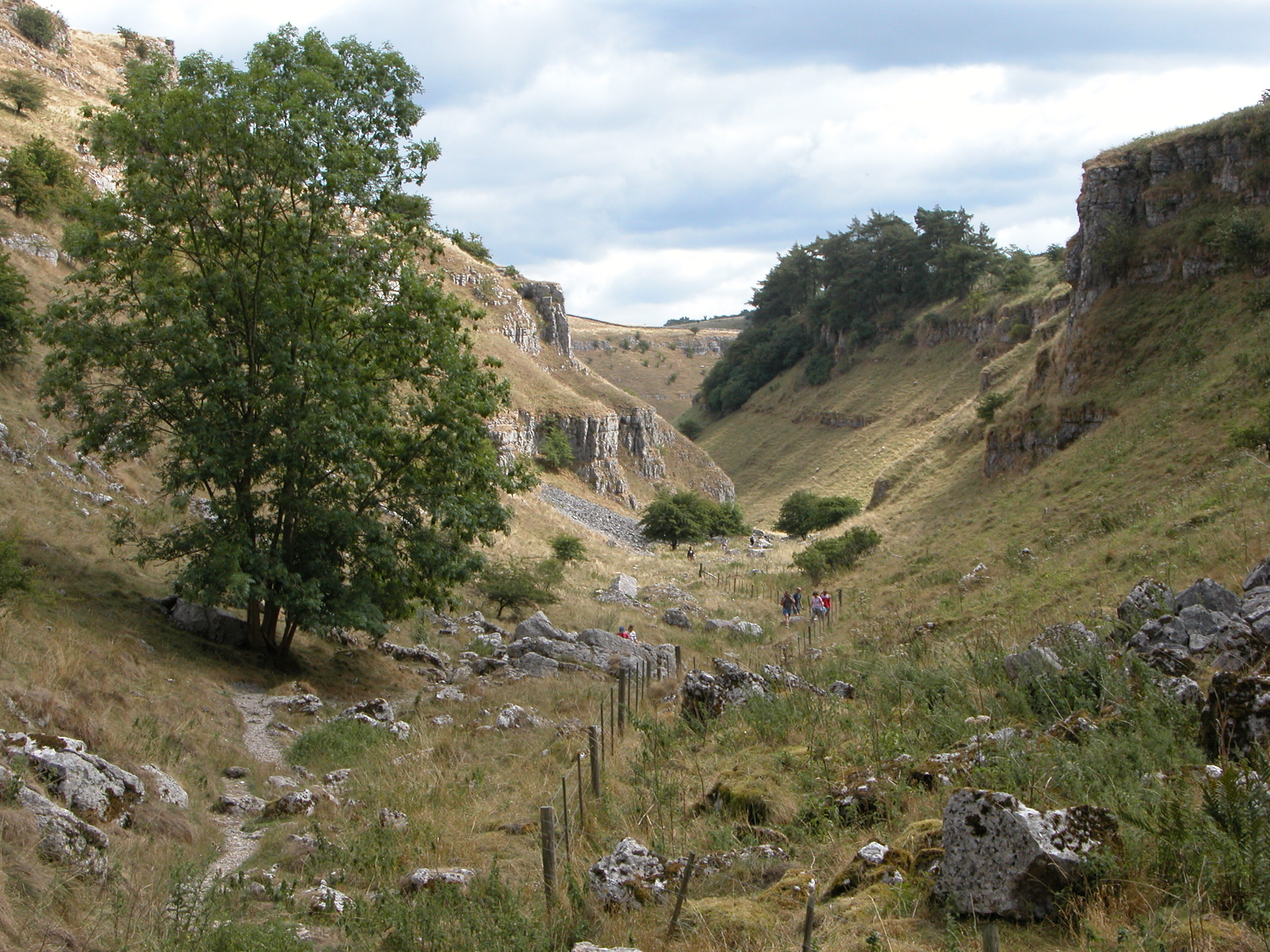
View downdale

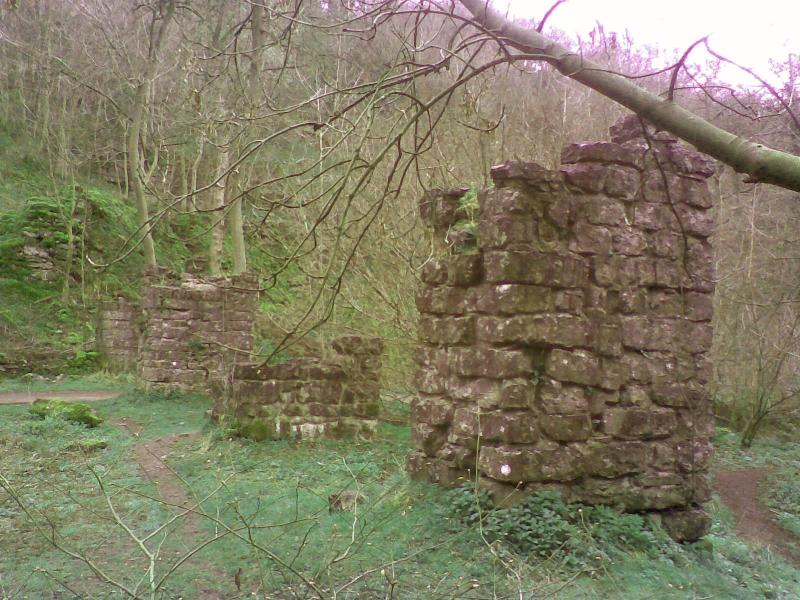
The remains of the aqueduct in Lathkill Dale.

The Lathkill Dale starts just to the east of the small village of Monyash, to the west of Bakewell, and is dry initially. In times of high rainfall the source of the river is Lathkill Head Cave (SK170658), where water which has flowed underground from the Flagg area to the west of Monyash emerges, but in drier conditions the river rises from springs further down the valley. It flows generally eastward, and at Cales Dale it is joined on the right bank by a small tributary. Like the Lathkill, Cales Dale is dry at its upper end, with its stream rising near the bottom end. The river flows over five weirs and a waterfall. To the south of Haddon Grove Farm, an early 19th-century farmhouse there are a series of weirs and sluices, at the start of a long section where the river and its banks are a scheduled monument. The Lathkill Dale and Mandale Mines and soughs have been protected because they are rare examples of lead mining activity preserved in good condition, dating from the 16th to the 19th centuries.

As the river flows to the south of the village of Over Haddon, it is crossed by a grade II listed footbridge, made from limestone slabs supported by limestone rubble piers, one of several similar bridges in the area. It probably dates from the 18th century, and replaced a similar earlier bridge. Near the bridge is Sough Mill, a corn mill dating from the 18th century with a sluice gate nearby. Shortly afterwards, the river flows over eleven weirs, some with sluices, and there are two fish ponds on the right bank, connected to the river by sluices. There is another weir and sluice at Conksbury bridge (SK211656) which carries the road from Bakewell to Youlgreave over the river. It dates from the 18th century, and was mentioned in the Turnpike Act (1758). It consists of a main gritstone arch over the river, with two smaller arches to either side, with a second large arch on the right bank of the river.

At this point, the river is heading to the south-east, and is crossed by Coal Pit Bridge, a mid-18th-century footbridge which is just 3 feet (0.9 m) wide. It has a large arch in the centre, with smaller arches to either side. There are weirs, sluices and fish ponds on the upstream side, and three more weirs on the downstream side. There are several more weirs as the river approaches the village of Alport. The minor road from Rowsley to Youlgreave crosses the river just before it is joined by the River Bradford on it right bank. It turns to the east and is crossed by a footbridge and by Mill Bridge, which was built in the 18th century but raised in the early 19th. It is quite narrow, with a single arch over the river topped by ashlar parapets, where each of the ashlar blocks has a letter and a number inscribed in it. The river then turns to the north, and Alport Mill, a corn mill dating thom the 18th century which is now part of a trout farm is on the right bank. Nearby is another 18th-century footbridge with three shallow arches.

There are more weirs before the river turns to the east, where there is a small bridge over the river. The land on the right bank is a scheduled monument, the site of Alport Smelt Mill, associated with the lead mining industry. At the eastern end of the site, weirs and a sluice form a large pond in the river, which then flows over several more weirs, before the Ivy Bar Brook joins on the right bank. Next comes Hawley Bridge, which has two arches and has a datestone showing the year 1775. A small bridge carries the access road to Bower Hall, a late 17th-century house to the south of the river. The final bridge carries Stantonhall Lane over the river close to Lathkill Lodge. It has a single arch and dates from the early 19th century. Shortly afterwards, the river joins the River Wye on its right bank, close to Haddon Hall and to the west of Rowsley.

== History ==
The dale has a history of lead mining, and among the trees on the north side of the valley are the remains of the 19th-century Mandale Mine, including an old aqueduct and the ruined pump house. There were two mines in the valley, Mandale Mine to the east and Lathkill Dale Mine to the west. Mining at Mandale was first recorded in the 13th century, and was taking place on both sides of the river by 1495. Miners had reached a depth of 300 feet (91 m) by 1615, but there were problems with water entering the workings. Work began on constructing Mandale Sough in 1798, to carry water out of the mine, but progress was slow, and had ceased by 1836. Mine owners attempted to prevent the river flooding into the working by building walls along both of its banks for a considerable distance. The Mandale Mining Company was formed and took over the mine in 1839. They installed a steam engine and water wheel to raise water into the sough. This enabled them to extract more ore, but the waterwheel proved to be inadequate, and a Cornish beam engine was erected in 1847. Success was short-lived, as the company was wound up in 1851, and the equipment sold in 1852. Some small-scale activity continued until around 1867.

Documentation for Lathkill Dale Mine starts in 1700, although it may have been worked earlier than that. Two waterwheels were in use by the 1720s, to keep the workings drier. Productivity improved when the Lathkill Dale Sough was constructed in 1743. The London Lead Mining Company took over the workings in 1764 and extended the sough, but ceased operating in 1777. After a period of inactivity, it was bought by Thomas Bateman and John Alsop in 1825, who built a new leat, known as the aqueduct leat, and installed an early water turbine patented by the Daykeyne Brothers. The leat was subsequently widened, to accommodate a larger waterwheel. The operation largely ceased in 1841-2. They attempted to sell the wheel in 1847 and it was removed in 1861. The owners of Mandale Mine extended the aqueduct leat and built a launder of wooden troughs on stone piers to carry it over the river in the early 1840s. The remains of both mines became a scheduled monument in 1998, because of the diversity of features that remain and their state of preservation.

=== Milling ===
The river has provided power to at least three water mills. The furthest upstream was Carter's Mill, to the west of the Lathkill Dale Mine scheduled area. It was probably built to serve the lead miners, and dates from the early 19th century. The building was quite large and appeared on the 1840 Ordnance Survey map. It was labelled as a flour mill on the 1880 map, and as disused on the 1922 map. It was powered by a large overshot water wheel, which was sold for scrap at the end of the 19th century. Only the footings and a few courses of the stone walls of the building remain, but there are two weirs, one with a sluice, and some large stones were placed in the river to divert some of its flow into the mill race.

At the eastern end of the scheduled area is Sough Mill, where there has been a corn mill since 1529. The two storey building dates from the 18th century, and still stands, although its water wheel has been removed. The roof is made of stone slabs, while the dam and sluices are well preserved, but the mill pond is dry. It powered a single pair of millstones, and in 1975 still retained much of its 19th-century wooden machinery, although this had been removed by 2011. The mill is a listed building, and in 2024 a planning application was submitted to convert the building for residential use, including a replacement ground floor room and some work on the sluice gate.

Alport Mill is located on the right bank of the river below its confluence with the River Bradford. No mill was mentioned at Alport when the Domesday Book was written in 1086, but a corn mill was documented in 1159-60, and it was mentioned in the Haddon Charters in 1208 and many times subsequently. It was owned by the cannons of Darley Abbey who were permitted to raise the mill pool in the late 13th century by Richard of Harthill. The cannons then allowed Richard to grind corn at the mill for his own household. The present building dates from the 18th century, and retains much of its machinery and five pairs of millstones. It was powered by a breastshot water wheel, 21 feet (6.4 m) in diameter and 5 feet (1.5 m) wide, which is still in situ, although largely hidden by a high wall. The tailrace runs through a tunnel, to discharge into the river further downstream. A drying kiln dating from the 19th century is also still intact. The building is owned by the Haddon Estate, and the ground floor was in use as a hatchery for trout in 1999.

=== Ecology ===
The water in the river is often clear, and Charles Cotton writing in The Compleat Angler in 1653 noted that it was

... by many degrees, the purest and most transparent stream that I ever saw, either at home or abroad, and breeds, it is said, the reddest and best Trouts in England.

The Environment Agency classify the river as not "artificial or heavily modified", although it is difficult to understand the basis for this designation, since there are a large number of fishing weirs, introduced in the 19th century, and the channel has been realigned at a number of locations, including some where the river no longer occupies the valley floor, but is a little higher up as a result of artificial banking. As well as straightening the channel and constructing weirs and sluices, the Victorians also lined the river bed with puddled clay, to try to prevent water being lost into the drainage sough which passes beneath the river. One result of the lead mining industry in the valley is that the water contains quantities of lead and its compounds, which exceed the concentrations needed to rate the chemical status as good. Despite this, invertebrate populations in the river do not appear to reflect this.

The river valley, known as Lathkill Dale, is popular with tourists who visit for its natural environment and wildlife. Much of the river itself, and sections of the river valley, fall within the Lathkill or Upper Lathkill SSSIs and the Derbyshire Dales National Nature Reserve. Among the species that thrive there are brown trout, dipper, and the rare wild plant Jacob's ladder.

Through the use of Bluetooth, it is now possible at particular locations in the nature reserve for visitors to download pictures of flowers and birds, and also examples of birdsong, onto their mobile phones.

The dale was used as a filming location for The Princess Bride, which was released in 1987. It is a multi-genre film, including elements of fantasy, comedy and romance, and is adapted from a novel by William Goldman. A rock shelf, where Lathkill Dale and Cales Dale meet, was the setting for The Battle of Wits, where one of the characters dies after drinking wine laced with poison.

== Access ==
There is good access to most of the river. A public footpath runs down Lathkill Dale from where it meets the B5055 road near Monyash. From Lathkill Head Cave, it runs along the left bank to the small valley that runs up to Mill Farm. A permissive footpath continues along the left bank to Over Haddon footbridge, and then becomes a public footpath as far as Conksbury Bridge. Crossing the bridge, another footpath runs along the right bank, although it is set back from the river in places. It ends at Alport Lane Bridge, and below that, there are no footpaths along the banks, although the road from Alport to Haddon Hall, initially unclassified and later the B5056, runs quite close to the river.

There are car parks at Over Haddon, Moor Lane, Youlgrave and Conksbury Bridge, and bus services run from Over Haddon, Monyash and Youlgreave.

== Water quality ==
The Environment Agency assesses the water quality within the river systems in England. Each is given an overall ecological status, which may be one of five levels: high, good, moderate, poor and bad. There are several components that are used to determine this, including biological status, which looks at the quantity and varieties of invertebrates, angiosperms and fish. Chemical status, which compares the concentrations of various chemicals against known safe concentrations, is rated good or fail.

The water quality of the River Lathkill catchment was as follows in 2019/2022:

Section	Ecological Status	Chemical Status	Length	Catchment
Lathkill from Source to Bradford	Moderate	Fail	4.7 miles (7.6 km)	16.38 square miles (42.4 km^{2})
Lathkill from Bradford to Wye	Moderate	Fail	2.2 miles (3.5 km)	3.88 square miles (10.0 km^{2})

The chemical status is rated as fail, due to the levels of lead compounds in the upper river, and of lead and cadmium compounds in the lower river. These are the result of the historic quarrying industry in the valley. Like most rivers in the UK, in 2019 the chemical status was also affected by the presence of polybrominated diphenyl ethers (PBDE), which had not previously been included in the assessment.

== See also ==
- River Dove
- List of rivers in the Peak District
- Rivers of the United Kingdom
- Derbyshire lead mining history

== Bibliography ==
- Cowx, John M. E.; Drew, Ian B. (2011). "Hydromorphological Appraisal of the Use of Large Woody Debris in the Restoration of the River Lathkill, Derbyshire" (PDF). River Restoration Centre. Archived (PDF) from the original on 14 March 2025.
- NNR (18 July 2014). "Derbyshire Dales National Nature Reserve (NE154)". Natural England. ISBN 978-1-84754-123-9. Archived from the original on 20 May 2024.
- Wild Trout Trust (July 2018). "Lathkill (Waltonian Angling Club) Advisory Visit" (PDF). Archived (PDF) from the original on 14 March 2025.
