= Davenport railway station (England) =

Railway station in Greater Manchester, England

Davenport
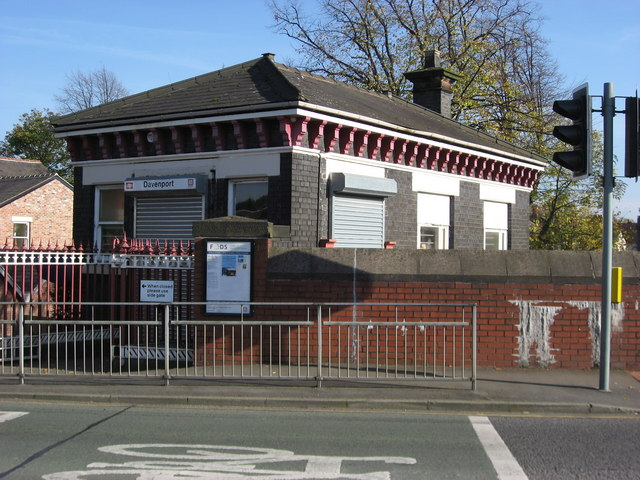

General information
- Location: Davenport, Stockport; England
- Grid reference: SJ899882
- Manager: Northern Trains
- Transit authority: Greater Manchester
- Platforms: 2

Other information
- Station code: DVN
- Classification: DfT category E

History
- Opened: 1 March 1858

Passengers
- 2020/21: ▼68,610
- 2021/22: ▲0.215 million
- 2022/23: ▲0.233 million
- 2023/24: ▲0.263 million
- 2024/25: ▲0.291 million
Location
Notes
- Passenger statistics from the Office of Rail and Road

Davenport railway station serves the Davenport suburb of Stockport, Greater Manchester, England. The station is 7 miles (11 km) south-east of Manchester Piccadilly on the Buxton line.

== History ==
Location (red dot) within Stockport's historical rail network

It was opened by the Stockport, Disley and Whaley Bridge Railway on 1 March 1858, as a result of a complaint from Colonel William Davenport, a local landowner, that the company had not honoured its initial promise to provide a station at Bramhall Lane (which was, at that time, just outside the boundary of Stockport Borough). A small passenger station was opened and named Davenport. Trade was slight and it closed in September 1859, to be reopened on 1 January 1862.

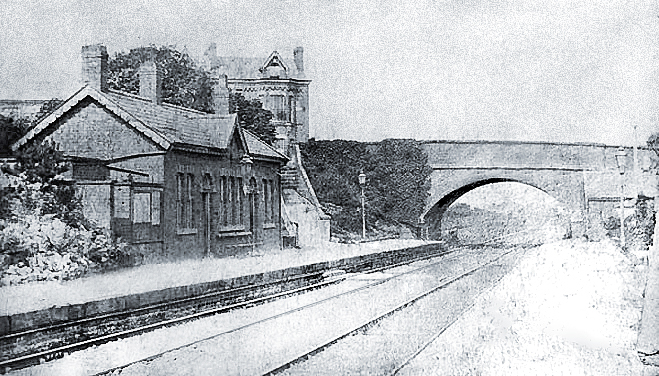
The station in the 1870s

Davenport station has been typically served by trains on the Buxton line between Manchester Piccadilly and Buxton. However, through running north of Manchester has operated on services at times during the early 21st century. It ceased temporarily as part of a major timetable change in May 2018; resumed in May 2019 with an hourly service running from Hazel Grove to Blackpool North, and running was stopped again in December 2022.

== Facilities ==
The station has a ticket office at street level, which is staffed in the mornings through until early afternoon, six days per week (closed all day Sunday). At all other times, tickets must be bought on the train or prior to travel. Waiting shelters are provided at platform level on each side, whilst train running information is offered by means of CIS displays and timetable posters. No step-free access is available to either platform, as each one is linked to the ticket office and road via staircases.

== Service ==
Two Northern Trains services per hour operate northbound to Manchester Piccadilly and southbound to Hazel Grove during Monday to Saturday daytimes, with one train per hour continuing to Buxton. Sunday services operate hourly in each direction between Manchester Piccadilly and Buxton.

Services on the Hope Valley Line to/from Chinley or Sheffield pass through the station but do not stop; these are operated by Northern and TransPennine Express.

Preceding station	National Rail	Following station
Woodsmoor	Northern Trains Buxton line	Stockport
