= Davenport, Greater Manchester =

Suburb of Stockport, Greater Manchester, England

Coordinates: 53.388374°N 2.158888°W

Davenport
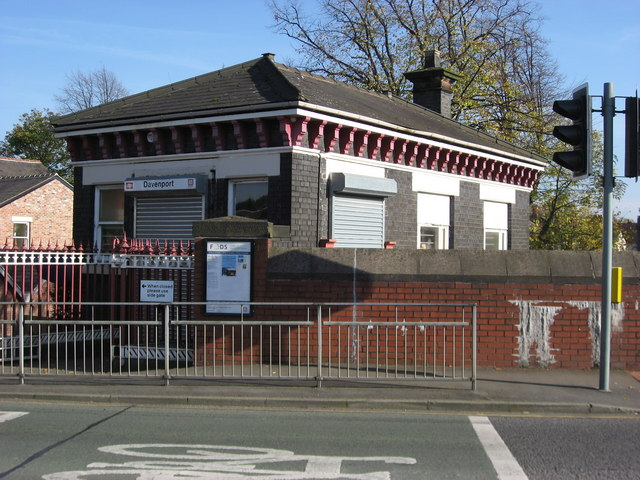
- Davenport railway station in 2007

- Location within Greater Manchester
- Population: 14,924
- OS grid reference: SJ895879
- Metropolitan borough: Stockport
- Metropolitan county: Greater Manchester
- Region: North West
- Country: England
- Sovereign state: United Kingdom
- Post town: STOCKPORT
- Postcode district: SK3
- Dialling code: 0161
- Police: Greater Manchester
- Fire: Greater Manchester
- Ambulance: North West
- UK Parliament: Stockport

Davenport is a district of Stockport, in Greater Manchester, England; until 1974, it was part of Cheshire. At the 2011 census, it had a population of 14,924.

== History ==
Davenport's name arose from the building of Davenport railway station at the behest of the Davenport family, who had owned Bramall Hall in nearby Bramhall since the later 14th century. The family name came from an ancestral estate between Holmes Chapel and Congleton, in mid-Cheshire. The estate is recorded in the Domesday Book of 1086, where it is listed as Deneport.

Originally, Davenport's expansion in the 1850s consisted of three key routes: Bramhall Lane, Kennerley Road and Buxton Road; all of these remain in place today.

The 1900s saw an increase in construction of residential houses and commercial developments. The aftermath of World War II saw the demolition of larger, older properties in extensive gardens to make way for smaller private residences and flats.

== Transport ==
Davenport railway station is sited at the main road junction. Northern Trains operates regular services between Manchester Piccadilly, Stockport, Hazel Grove and Buxton. Services are generally half-hourly, but hourly on Sundays.

Local bus services are operated by Stagecoach Manchester. Circular routes from Stockport include the 374 to Hazel Grove and the 378/9 to Bramhall and Heald Green.

== Places of interest ==
Cale Green Park is a popular local attraction with its bowling green, tennis court, basketball court and playground.

Stockport Lacrosse Club, the oldest in England, has played at Cale Green Cricket Club since 1876.

== Education ==
Adswood and St Ambrose Catholic are the nearest primary schools.

Stockport Grammar School, founded in 1487, lies next to Davenport Park on Buxton Road; immediately across the road is Stockport School, which was founded in 1888.
