= Buxton railway station (Midland Railway) =

Former railway station in Derbyshire, England

Buxton
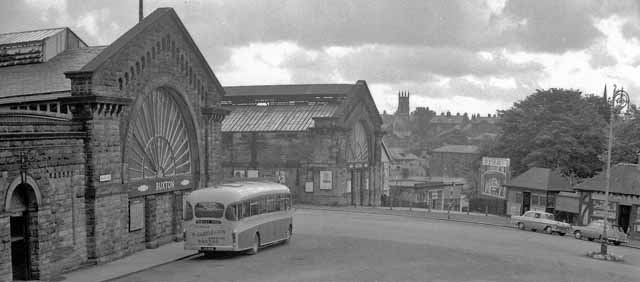
- The two stations at Buxton; the Midland station is the further away of the two

General information
- Location: Buxton, High Peak; England
- Coordinates: 53.2598°N 1.9126°W
- Grid reference: SK059736
- Platforms: 3

Other information
- Status: Disused

History
- Original company: Midland Railway
- Pre-grouping: Midland Railway
- Post-grouping: London, Midland and Scottish Railway

Key dates
- 1 June 1863: Station opened
- 6 March 1967: Station closed
Location

Buxton (Midland) railway station served the town of Buxton, Derbyshire, England between 1863 and 1967. It was one of two stations in the town centre that were sited next to each other; only Buxton railway station remains in operation.

== History ==
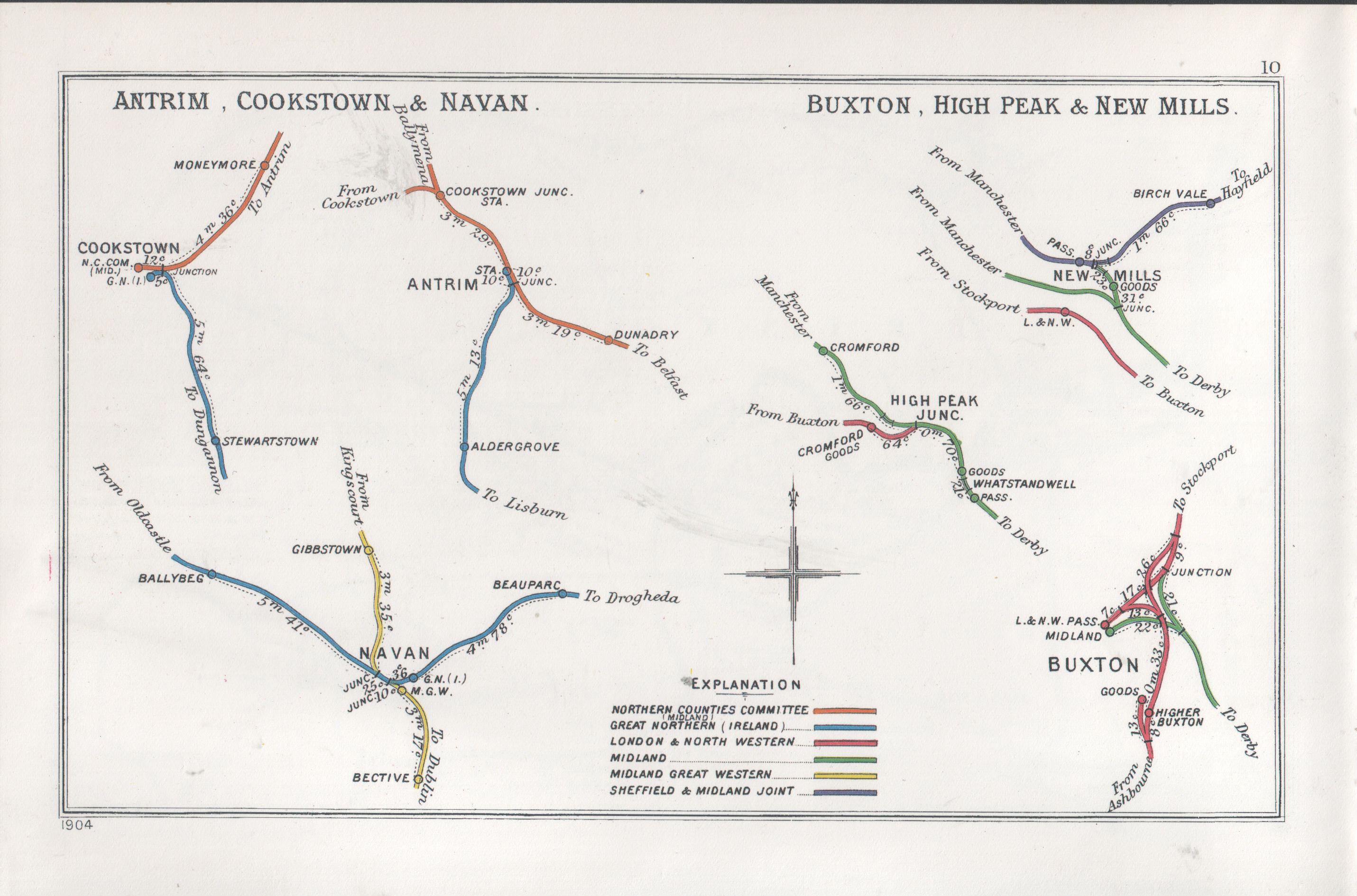
A 1904 Railway Clearing House Junction Diagram showing (lower right) railways in the vicinity of Buxton (Midland Railway in green)

The station was opened by the Midland Railway (MR) on 1 June 1863. It was adjacent to, and to the south-east of, the Buxton railway station of the Stockport, Disley and Whaley Bridge Railway, which opened two weeks later. The two stations had similar end walls, incorporating large fan-shaped windows.

The station was the terminus of the MR route from Derby. This route had opened as far as Rowsley on 4 June 1849; and was continued to Buxton in 1863. The station was 164 miles 55 chains (265.0 km) from St Pancras.

The station closed on 6 March 1967. Most of the station was subsequently demolished and the land used for a ring road.

Preceding station	Disused railways	Following station
Terminus	Midland Railway; Manchester, Buxton, Matlock and Midland Junction Railway	Peak Forest; Line and station closed
Terminus	Midland Railway; Manchester, Buxton, Matlock and Midland Junction Railway	Blackwell Mill; Line and station closed

== Peak Rail ==
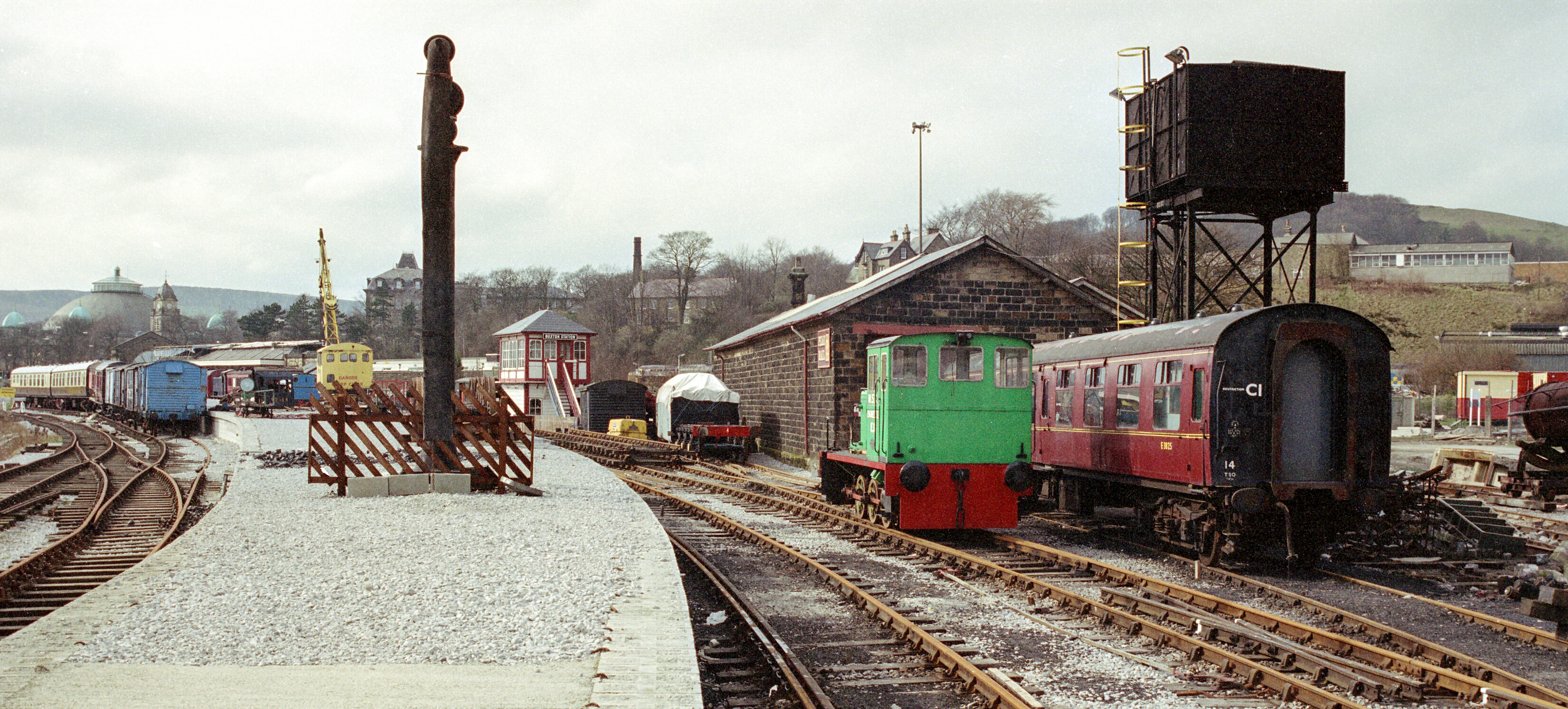
The Buxton Steam Centre of the Peak Railway Preservation Society, as it was in March 1990 before closure

Part of the site, including the trackbed of the tracks outside the station, were occupied by the Buxton Steam Centre of the Peak Rail heritage railway in the 1970s; it relaid track with ambitions to reopen the line towards Millers Dale. This plan failed; they moved their entire operations and stock to the section between Matlock Riverside and Darley Dale, where the railway was reopened in 1992.

In June 2019, Peak Rail announced that they hoped to recommence work on the Buxton site during the summer of 2019. Support of the local MP was gained; however, the builder of a new development was causing difficulties with access. As of 2024, plans have not yet come to fruition.

== The site today ==
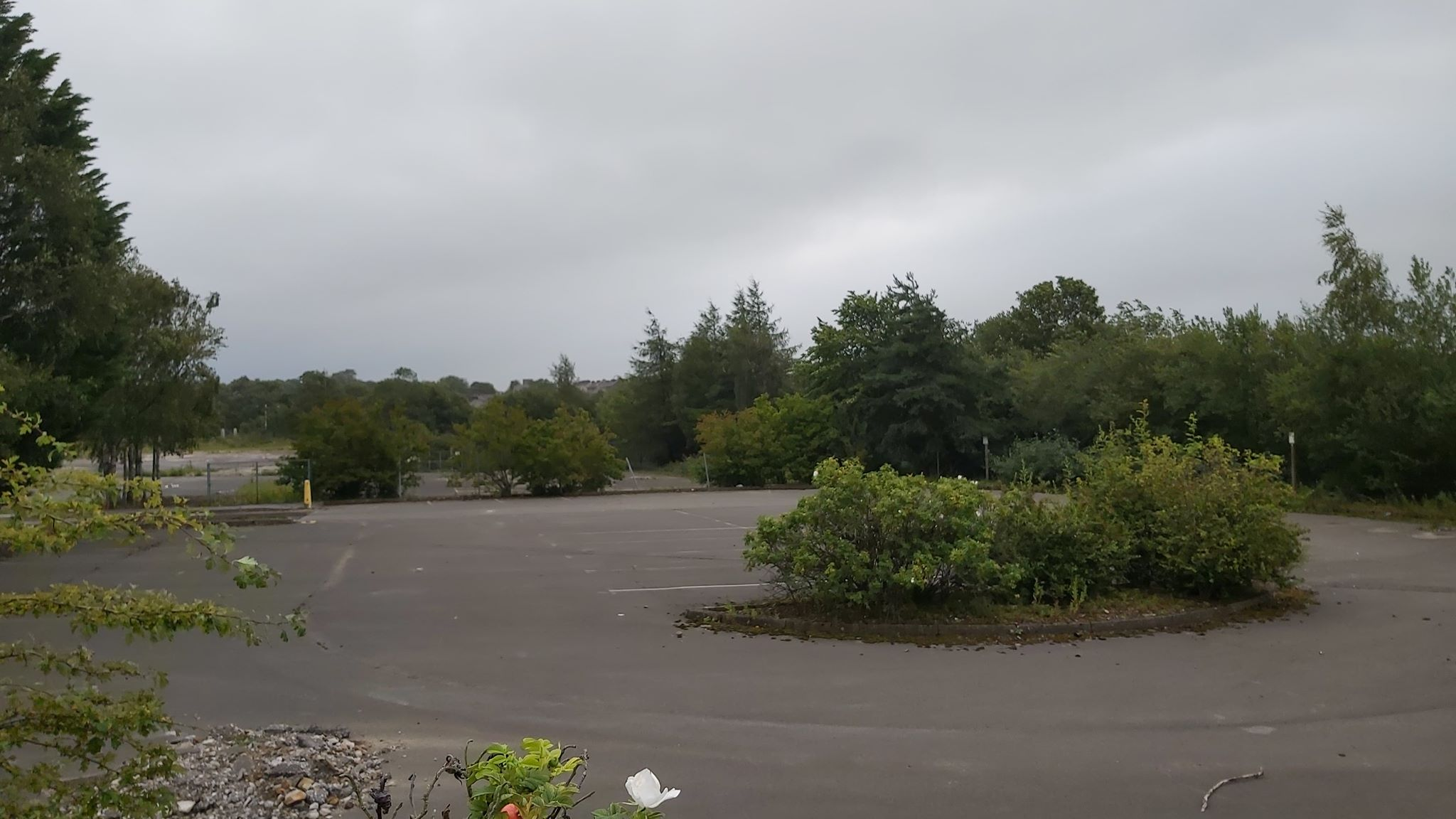
Buxton Midland station in 2019

A small section of stonework that supported the original end wall and the platform that Peak Rail built remain extant. A shopping centre and a 1980s ring road now cover much of the site.
