= Dove Holes railway station =

Railway station in Derbyshire, England

Coordinates: 53.29980°N 1.89043°W

Dove Holes
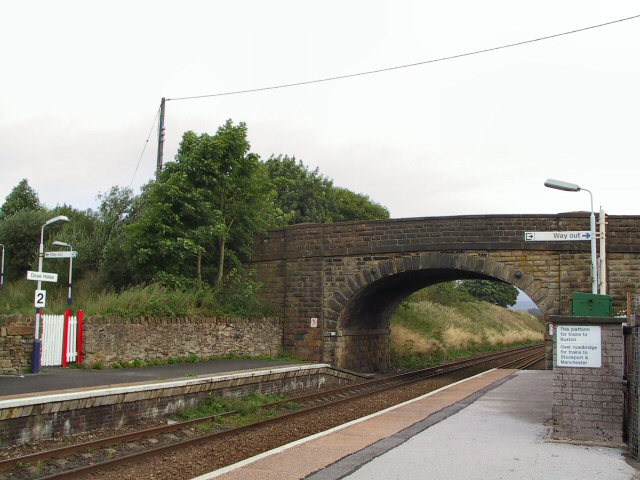

General information
- Location: Dove Holes, High Peak; England
- Grid reference: SK074781
- Manager: Northern Trains
- Platforms: 2

Other information
- Station code: DVH
- Classification: DfT category F2

History
- Opened: 1863

Passengers
- 2021/22: ▲14,826
- 2022/23: ▼11,646
- 2023/24: ▼8,676
- 2024/25: ▲10,384
- 2025/26: ▲11,146
Location
Notes
- Passenger statistics from the Office of Rail and Road

Dove Holes railway station serves the village of Dove Holes, in Derbyshire, England. The station is on the Buxton line between Manchester Piccadilly and Buxton; it is situated 22 3/4 miles (36.6 km) south-east of Piccadilly. It is managed and served by Northern Trains.

== History ==
The station was opened in 1863 by the London and North Western Railway (LNWR), at the summit of its line between Whaley Bridge and Buxton.

Originally, the Midland Railway had hoped that the LNWR would join it in extending the line that they jointly leased between Ambergate and Rowsley. The LNWR declined and subsequently built this line from Buxton to meet its route to Manchester.

Later, the Midland built a line from Millers Dale to Chinley, via Chapel, passing 183 feet beneath it in Dove Holes Tunnel.

=== Accident ===
In 1957, the steep gradient north of here down towards Chapel-en-le-Frith was the scene of a serious accident, in which the driver of a runaway freight train, John Axon, remained at his post and died when it ran into the back of a preceding train. Axon was awarded a posthumous George Cross for his actions.

== Facilities ==
The station is unstaffed and has no ticket facilities, so all tickets must be bought on the train or prior to travel. There are no permanent buildings, other than waiting shelters on each platform; train running details are provided by telephone and timetable poster boards. Step-free access is available to both platforms via ramps.

== Service ==
Northern Trains operates a generally hourly service in each direction between Manchester Piccadilly, Stockport and Buxton, but only alternate trains stop at Dove Holes. There are some additional calls at peak times.

| Preceding station | National Rail | Following station |
|---|---|---|
| Buxton | Northern Buxton line | Chapel-en-le-Frith |

== See also ==
- Peak Forest Tramway
