= Buxton TMD =

Former railway maintenance depot in Buxton, Derbyshire

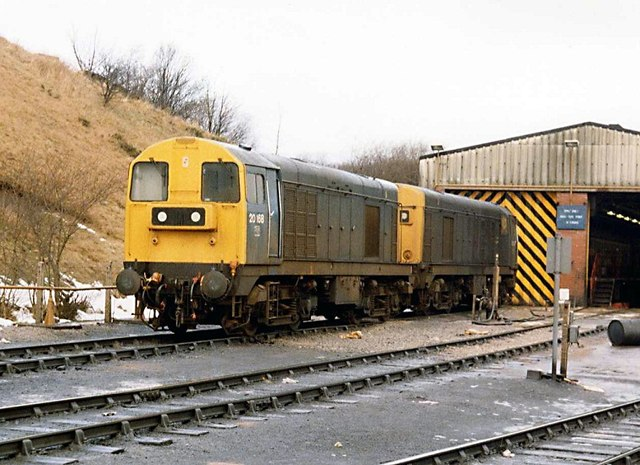
- Class 20 locomotives outside Buxton TMD in 1986
- Interactive map of Buxton TMD

Location
- Location: Buxton, Derbyshire
- Coordinates: 53.2619°N 1.9114°W
- OS grid: SK060739

Characteristics
- Owner: British Rail
- Depot code: BX (1973 - 199X)
- Type: DMU

History
- Opened: 1957
- Closed: 1990s

Buxton TMD was a traction maintenance depot in Buxton, Derbyshire, England. The depot was situated on the west side of the Buxton line, to the immediate north of Buxton station.

The site has subsequently been cleared by DB Schenker, the operator of heavy freight in the area.

The depot code was BX.

== History ==
Before its closure in the late 1990s, the depot had an allocation of 104 and 108 DMUs. Stabled locomotives included Classes 08, 20, 25, 31, 37, 45 and 47. Classes 101 and 102 DMUs could also be seen at the depot. The depot was used from 1994 to 1997 as a fuelling point until fuelling facilities were installed at Peak Forest where the stabling of the locos was transferred to.

== Bibliography ==
- Marsden, Colin J. (1987). BR Depots. Motive power recognition. Vol. 6. Ian Allan Ltd. ISBN 9780711017191. OCLC 18685680.
- Webster, Neil; Greengrass, Robert; Greaves, Simon (1987). British Rail Depot Directory. Metro Enterprises Ltd. ISBN 9780947773076. OCLC 20420397.
