= Fairfield Halt railway station =

Former railway station in England

Fairfield Halt

General information
- Location: Buxton, High Peak, Derbyshire; England
- Coordinates: 53°16′1″N 1°54′23″W
- Grid reference: SK063744
- Platforms: 1

Other information
- Status: Disused

History
- Original company: LNWR
- Post-grouping: LMS

Key dates
- 16 December 1907: Opened
- 11 September 1939: Closed
Location

Fairfield Halt was a railway station at Fairfield near Buxton, Derbyshire that was open between 1907 and 1939. The station was opened by the London & North Western Railway (LNWR) on 16 December 1907 to serve the nearby Buxton Golf Club. Opening the station had been requested by the golf club committee and the local authority to attract more visitors who lived close to the LNWR's line between Manchester and Buxton.

The station was unusual in that it only had one platform and was only served by trains heading to Buxton. In addition passengers were only allowed to alight from trains.

Known at various times as simply Fairfield, Fairfield Halt and Fairfield Halt for Golf Links, the station closed at the outbreak of the Second World War.
