= WSR =

WSR may refer to:

- Warren and Saline River Railroad in Arkansas, United States
- Water speed record
- Weather surveillance radar
- West Somerset Railway in England
- West Surrey Racing, a UK-based motorsport team
- West Sussex Railway in England
- Wii Sports Resort, a 2009 sports video game developed and published by Nintendo
- Wild and Scenic River, a federal lands designation in the United States
- Woodsmoor railway station (UK railway station code WSR)
- World Series by Renault
- Waist-to-stature ratio
- Windows Speech Recognition — a speech recognition component introduced in Windows Vista
