= John Axon =

British train driver, posthumous recipient of the George Cross

John Axon GC
- Born: 4 December 1900; Stockport, Cheshire, England
- Died: 9 February 1957 (aged 56); Chapel-en-le-Frith, Derbyshire, England
- Occupation: Train driver
- Family: John Axon (grandson)

John Axon (4 December 1900 – 9 February 1957) was an English train driver from Stockport (Edgeley depot) who died while trying to stop a runaway freight train on a 1 in 58 gradient at Chapel-en-le-Frith, in Derbyshire, after a brake failure. The train consisted of an ex-LMS Stanier Class 8F 2-8-0 no. 48188 hauling 33 wagons and a brake van.

== Life ==
John Axon was born on 4 December 1900 in Stockport, Cheshire. On leaving school, he became an apprentice painter and decorator. In 1919, he joined the London and North Western Railway as a cleaner, later becoming a fireman. From 1921, he was an engine driver, serving with the London, Midland and Scottish Railway from 1923 and British Railways after 1948.

== Accident ==
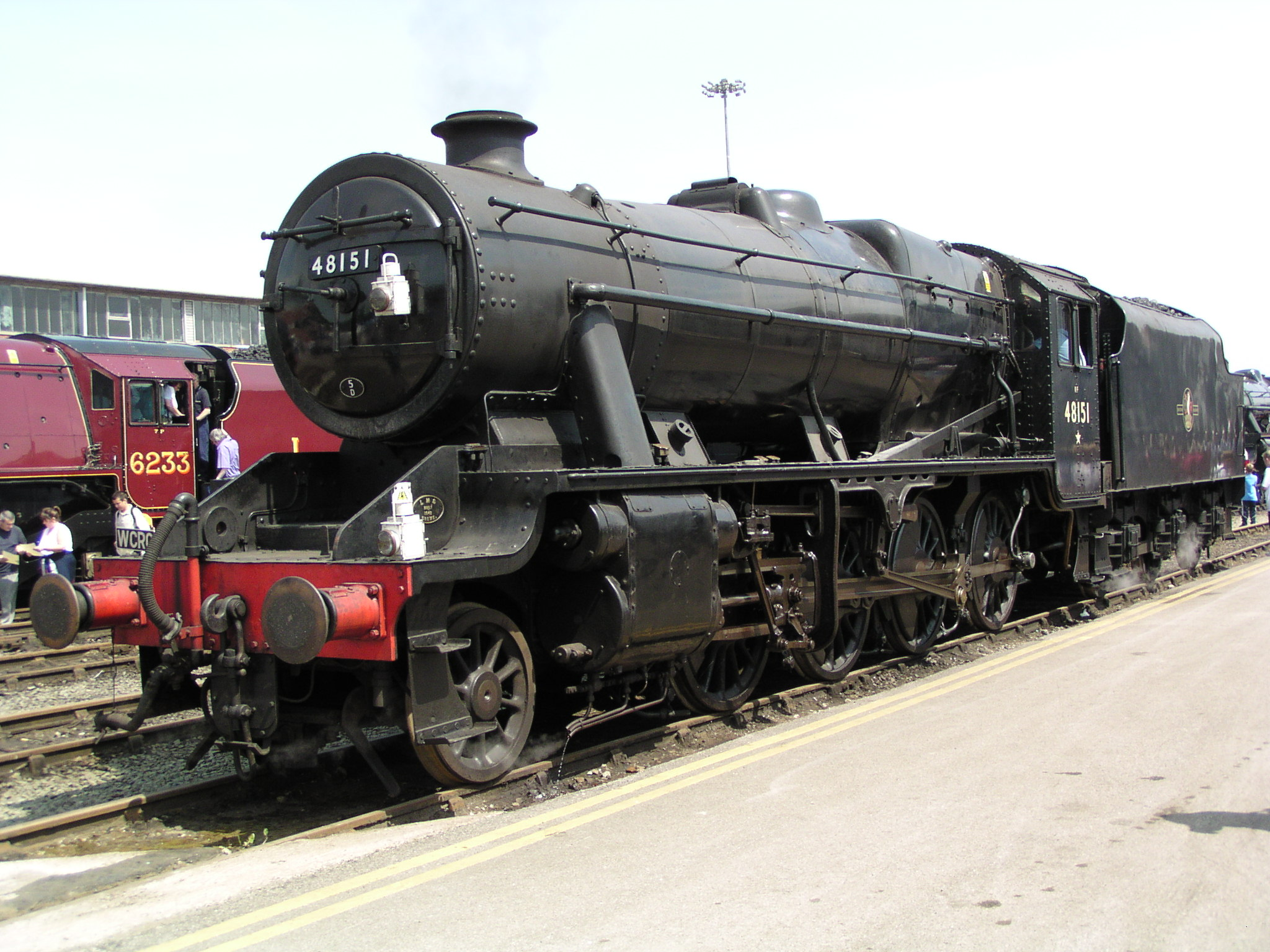
Preserved LMS Stanier Class 8F locomotive, of the sort involved in the accident

On the outward trip from Stockport to Buxton on 9 February 1957, Driver Axon had noticed a leak from the supply to the locomotive steam brake and had requested and received fitter's attention at Buxton depot. On the return trip to Stockport, the repair did not hold and the brake pipe fractured, disabling the locomotive steam brake and filling the cab with scalding steam, making it very difficult and painful for Axon and the fireman, Ron Scanlon, to reach the controls. Despite this, Axon and Scanlon managed to partly close the regulator and screw down the engine's tender brakes to negligible effect. The inability to use the locomotive's whistle meant that the crew of the banking engine at the rear of Axon's train remained unaware of the problems at the front and kept pushing the train towards Dove Holes summit.

Axon told Scanlon to jump off and attempt to apply the wagon brakes of the loose-coupled train. Due to the speed the train was travelling, Scanlon only managed to apply a few before the train reached the summit and began accelerating down the 1-in-58 gradient towards Chapel-en-le-Frith. As the crew of the banking engine reached the summit to let the train continue under its own power, they were alarmed to see the train accelerating away from them and the guard frantically applying the brakes to his van.

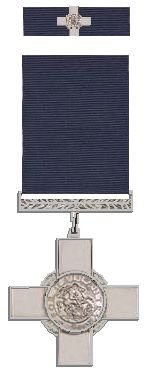
George Cross and its ribbon bar

At the time of the locomotive failure, Axon could have jumped clear of the then slow-moving train. However, aware of the danger that his train posed to life further down the line, he stayed at his post despite the scalding steam on the footplate.

Axon waved a warning to the signalman at Dove Holes, who opted to reverse the loop points despite the fact that the down main was still occupied by the Rowsley goods train. Knowing that the runaway train would derail on the trap siding, hitting Dove Holes signal box and station in the process, the signalman had the hope that Axon could regain control of his engine on the main line. He immediately telephoned to the Chapel-en-le-Frith signalman, who was in the process of clearing the Rowsley-to-Stockport freight service. He ordered the passengers of a stationary DMU to be moved to safety, but had no time to warn the crew of the passing goods to accelerate. The runaway smashed into the rear of it, killing John Axon and John Creamer, the other freight train's guard. The signalman barely escaped as the 8F's tender sideswiped his box, destroying it.

== Recognition ==
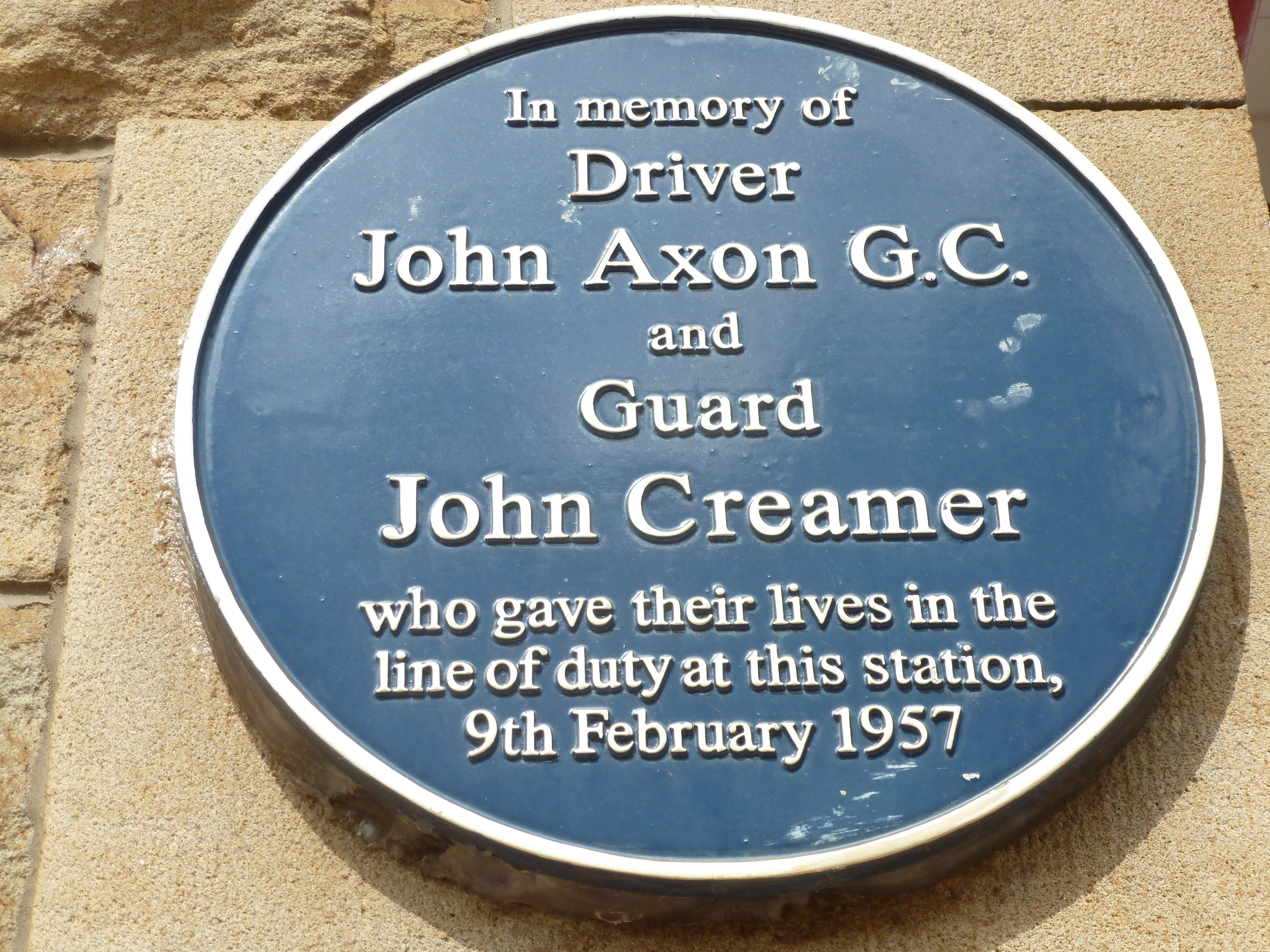
Plaque mounted at Chapel-en-le-Frith railway station commemorating John Axon and John Creamer

Axon was posthumously awarded the George Cross on 7 May 1957, which was donated to the National Railway Museum in York in 1978. He was also awarded the Order of Industrial Heroism by the Daily Herald.

He was the subject of a 1957 radio ballad, The Ballad of John Axon, the first of the series, written by Ewan MacColl and Peggy Seeger and produced by Charles Parker. A CD released in June 2008, 'Primary Transmission' by the artist Broadcaster on Red Grape Records, included the song 'Johnny' which is based on samples from the Ballad of John Axon and set to new music.

On 19 February 1981, a Class 86 electric locomotive (no. 86261) was named Driver John Axon, GC at a ceremony at London Euston.

In February 2007, a Class 150 diesel multiple unit (no. 150273) was named 'Driver John Axon, GC' at Buxton; this name has now passed onto a Class 156 (no. 156460).

A plaque commemorating the events is mounted at Chapel-en-le Frith station, on the station building facing onto the southbound platform.

== Family ==
On 20 September 1930, he married Gladys Richardson at St Matthew's Church, Stretford. They lived in Edgeley, Stockport, and had two sons. His grandson, also named John Axon (1960 – 2008), was a television actor best known for his role as Nigel Harper in The Royal; he also played roles in series such as Life on Mars, City Central and Peak Practice.

== See also ==
- Benjamin Gimbert
- Casey Jones
- James Nightall
- Norman Tunna
- Wallace Oakes
- André Tanguy
- Jesús García
- Lists of rail accidents.
