= Listed buildings in Chapel-en-le-Frith =

Chapel-en-le-Frith is a civil parish in the High Peak district of Derbyshire, England. The parish contains 76 listed buildings that are recorded in the National Heritage List for England. Of these, two are listed at Grade II*, the middle of the three grades, and the others are at Grade II, the lowest grade. The parish contains the town of Chapel-en-le-Frith and the surrounding area, including the smaller settlements of Dove Holes, Combs, Tunstead Milton, and Whitehough. Most of the listed buildings are houses, cottages and associated structures, farmhouses and farm buildings. The other listed buildings include churches and items in a churchyard, a market cross, public houses, two tombstones in a Friends' Burial Ground, a milestone and a milepost, bridges, a set of stocks, structures associated with the Peak Forest Tramway, schools, a mounting block incorporating a dog's kennel, a railway station, and two war memorials.

== Key ==
Grade	Criteria
II*	Particularly important buildings of more than special interest
II	Buildings of national importance and special interest

== Buildings ==
Name and location	Photograph	Date	Notes	Grade
High cross 53.32424°N 1.91494°W		11th century	The remains of the cross are in the churchyard of the Church of St Thomas Becket. They are in gritstone and consist of part of a rectangular shaft about 3 feet (0.91 m) high. There is interlace carving on all sides, and the shaft is set into a circular stone base.	II
Cross with sundial 53.32419°N 1.91497°W		11th century (probable)	The standing cross is in the churchyard of the Church of St Thomas Becket. It is in sandstone, and consists of a rectangular stepped and chamfered pier about 1.2 metres (3 ft 11 in) high. It stands on a circular base, and on the top is an 18th or 19th century sundial with a copper dial and a triangular scrolled gnomon.	II
Church of St Thomas Becket; 53.32437°N 1.91478°W		Early 14th century	The church has been altered and extended through the centuries, the tower was rebuilt and the south front remodelled in 1731–33, and the chancel was rebuilt in 1890–93. The church is built in gritstone with lead roofs, and consists of a nave, north and south aisles, a south porch, a chancel with a north vestry and a south organ bay, and a west tower. The tower has three stages, string courses, a blocked doorway on the south with pilasters, and a triglyph and metope frieze. The middle stage contains a circular window on the south side with keystones, in the top stage are paired semicircular-headed bell openings, a clock face, and a cornice, and the tower is surmounted by a parapet and pyramidal finials. The porch has pilasters, a round-headed doorway with a keystone and imposts, and above it is a sundial and urn finials.	II*
Ford Hall; 53.33736°N 1.88717°W		Late 16th century	A gritstone house, later divided, with roofs of stone slate and tile, it has a complex history. The oldest part is the northwest range of a larger house, there is a range of 1678, a taller range of 1727, a 19th-century block in Tudor style to the southeast, additions in the 1920s, and an earlier wing rebuilt from 1967. There are two storeys and an irregular plan. The south front has corner pilasters and a moulded eaves cornice, and contains a central doorway with a moulded architrave, and a broken pediment on scrolled brackets, and casement windows. To the east, steps lead up to a doorway with a chamfered surround and a hood mould, and further to the east is a canted bay window. In the west front is a mullioned and transomed window.	II
Bradshaw Hall; 53.32335°N 1.94356°W		c. 1620	A house that has been altered and restored, it is in gritstone with quoins, and a stone slate roof with coped gables and kneelers. There are two storeys and attics, and an irregular plan. On the north front are two gables, and a recessed bay containing two porches, one with a fluted frieze and two finials. The windows are mullioned or mullioned and transomed.	II
Gateway, Bradshaw Hall; 53.32344°N 1.94353°W		1620	The gateway is in gritstone, and has a semicircular arch about 12 feet (3.7 m) high and 18 feet (5.5 m) wide on piers about 6 feet (1.8 m) high. The arch is chamfered and flanked by fluted pilasters. Above the arch is a double-stepped hood mould, a moulded string course, and a fluted and gabled frieze. Over this is a moulded cornice stepped over a plaque containing a coat of arms, a name, and the date. At the top are stepped copings with finials.	II
Mill Cottage; 53.31801°N 1.95489°W		Early 17th century	The cottage, at one time partly a forge and extended in the 19th century, it is in gritstone with quoins and a stone slate roof. There are two storeys and a single-storey extension to the west. On the front are two four-light mullioned windows, and the other windows are casements.	II
Market Cross; 53.32324°N 1.91584°W		c. 1643	The market cross is in gritstone and about 8 feet (2.4 m) high. It consists of a Latin-type cross on a square, slightly tapering and partly chamfered pier, on a base of three square steps.	II
8 Market Place; 53.32352°N 1.91519°W	—	17th century	The house, which was refronted in the 19th century, is in gritstone, partly rendered, with quoins and a stone slate roof. There are two storeys on the north front and three on the south. The north front contains a doorway with a shouldered lintel, and in the south front are two doorways. The windows vary; most are casements, there is a mullioned window, and two semicircular-headed single-light windows.	II
22 Market Place; 53.32389°N 1.91497°W		17th century	Formerly the Bull's Head Inn, the building was refronted in the 18th century, and is a private house. It is in gritstone with a front of rusticated stucco, and a slate roof. There are two storeys and attics, and three bays. In the centre is a round-headed doorway with a moulded architrave, a lunette fanlight with Gothic tracery, and a keystone. Above the doorway is a projecting painted statue of a bull's head, and the windows are sashes with side lights.	II
25 Market Place; 53.32390°N 1.91530°W	—	17th century	The house was refronted in the 18th century, and is in gritstone with quoins and a tile roof. There are two storeys, attics and a basement, and three bays. In the centre is an inserted bow window, and to its right is a doorway with steps and a quoined surround. The other windows in the right two bays are small-paned, the left bay contains a later doorway and sash windows, and in the roof are two gabled dormers. At the rear are mullioned windows, one being a stair window.	II
Bowden Head Farmhouse; 53.33523°N 1.89755°W		17th century	The farmhouse is in gritstone with quoins and a stone slate roof with some slate. There are two storeys and four bays. On the south front is a projecting bay that has a coped gable with moulded kneelers. The windows are mullioned, and there is an inserted inscribed and dated lintel.	II
Lidgate Farmhouse; 53.32759°N 1.93963°W		17th century	The farmhouse, which has been altered, is in gritstone with quoins and a stone slate roof. There are two storeys and three bays. The central doorway has a chamfered quoined surround and a massive lintel. To the west is a three-light mullioned window, and the other windows are later replacements.	II
Lower Courses Farmhouse and barn 53.32764°N 1.93104°W		17th century	The farmhouse and barn are in gritstone with quoins and a stone slate roof. There are two storeys and attics, and the house and attached barn form an L-shaped plan. The windows are mullioned, with some mullions removed, and most have hood moulds.	II
Marsh Hall and barn 53.31603°N 1.92761°W		17th century	The farmhouse and barn are in gritstone with quoins, a string course, and slate roofs. There are two storeys, and the house has four bays. On the front is a doorway with a chamfered quoined surround and a lintel with a pointed arch. Most of the windows are mullioned, and the barn to the east has various irregular openings.	II
Old Hall Inn; 53.33532°N 1.94301°W		17th century	A public house in gritstone with quoins and a stone slate roof. There are two storeys and three bays, the left bay a gabled cross-wing. The doorway has a quoined surround and a large lintel, and the windows are mullioned, some with hood moulds. In the right two bays are gabled dormers. Attached to the west is a 19th-century house with a porch and bow windows.	II
Spire Hollins and outbuildings 53.30661°N 1.94966°W		17th century	The farmhouse, later a private house, was extended in the 20th century. It is in gritstone and has a slate roof with moulded gable copings, kneelers and ball finials. The garden front has two bays, the left bay gabled with three storeys, and the left bay, the extension, with two storeys. In the ground floor are mullioned windows, each with a large central round-arched light; in the left bay with five lights, and the right bay with three. The other windows are mullioned and transomed, and all the windows have hood moulds. Attached to the north are converted outbuildings.	II
Tombstone dated 1671; 53.33430°N 1.88793°W		1671	The tombstone in the Friends Burial Ground is in gritstone. It is a slab with a shouldered top about 3 feet (0.91 m) high, and has an inscription.	II
Barn, Brook House Farm; 53.30302°N 1.93700°W	—	Late 17th century	A multi-purpose farm building in gritstone with a stone slate roof. There is a single storey with lofts, and eight bays. The openings include two doorways with massive lintels, a double doorway with a segmental-arched head, a doorway with a quoined surround, and three tiers of slit vents. External steps containing a kennel recess and hen house lead to an upper floor doorway.	II
Tombstone dated 1685; 53.33431°N 1.88798°W		1685	The tombstone in the Friends Burial Ground is in gritstone. It is a slab with a broken top about 3 feet (0.91 m) high, and has an inscription.	II
Barn, Malcoff Farm; 53.34174°N 1.89311°W	—	Late 17th or early 18th century	A farm outbuilding that was later extended, it is in gritstone with quoins and a stone slate roof. There are two ranges, forming an L-shaped plan. The earlier range has a single storey with lofts, and five bays with rear outshuts. It contains a porch, various doorways, and vents. The later range has a continuous outshut, and consists of a cowshed and a cart shed.	II
Barn, All Stone Lee Farm; 53.29568°N 1.93513°W	—	1702	The barn is in gritstone with quoins, and a slate roof with a stone ridge. There is a single storey, and the barn contains three openings with chamfered quoined surrounds, one a doorway with a dated and initialled lintel.	II
Milestone, Tunstead Milton; 53.31732°N 1.95100°W		1724	The milestone is on the south side of Manchester Road (B5470 road). It is in gritstone, and is a rectangular slab about 2.5 feet (0.76 m) high with a shallow curved head. The milestone is inscribed with the distances to Manchester, Stockport, Chapel-en-le-Frith, Tideswell, and Chesterfield.	II
Barn, Spire Hollins Farm; 53.30672°N 1.94931°W	—	Early 18th century	The barn is in gritstone with quoins, and a stone slate roof, and outshuts. In the south front is a doorway with a chamfered quoined surround and a hood on octagonal columns, vents, and a hayloft door. The south front contains double doors.	II
Slackhall Farmhouse; 53.33390°N 1.88826°W		1727	The farmhouse, later a private house, is in gritstone with lintel bands, and a stone slate roof with coped gables and moulded kneelers. There are two storeys, a double depth plan, and a symmetrical front of five bays. The central bay has a two-storey arched niche containing a doorway with a chamfered surround, and above it is a decorative datestone and a round-arched single-light window with designs in the spandrels. Over both of the two outer bays is a gable containing a blind oval window (cf. blind window). The other windows have two lights and mullions, and at the rear is a mullioned and transomed stair window.	II
Hollinknoll; 53.31245°N 1.91056°W		1745	The house, which was extended in 1903, is in gritstone, with rusticated quoins, and a stone slate roof with coped gables and kneelers. There are two storeys, an original range of three bays, and a later projecting gabled cross-wing on the left. In the centre is a round-arched doorway with a projecting keystone. Above it is a datestone and a single-light sash window, and the other windows in the range are tripartite sashes. In the cross-wing the windows have architraves, the lights are divided by columns, and the upper window is a Venetian window.	II
Cartshed northwest of Bowden Hall; 53.33258°N 1.90037°W		18th century	The cartshed is in gritstone with quoins and a hipped stone slate roof. There is a single storey, and three bays. It is open to the east, with large square piers on massive stone bases, and timber lintels.	II
Gate piers, railings and gates, Church of St Thomas Becket; 53.32404°N 1.91494°W		18th century	The gates at the southern entrance to the churchyard are in cast iron, and are flanked by rectangular gritstone gate piers about 9 feet (2.7 m) high. Each pier has a moulded base, a large overhanging cornice, and a banded ball finial. Extending from the right pier is a length of cast iron railings.	II
Dove Dale, Lilac Cottage and Weston Cottage; 53.32546°N 1.93039°W		18th century	Two cottages, later three, in gritstone with quoins. There are two storeys, and each cottage has one bay. The doorway of the left cottage has a moulded architrave and a pediment on brackets, and above it is a blind niche. All the windows are mullioned with three-lights, and casements.	II
Ford Hall Bridge; 53.33681°N 1.88658°W		18th century	The bridge carries a road over a stream and is in gritstone. It consists of a single low arch with voussoirs and spandrels. The bridge has a string course, and parapets that have copings with bevelled upper edges.	II
Gates and gate piers, Hollinknoll; 53.31236°N 1.91114°W		18th century	The gate piers are in gritstone, and are square, rusticated, and 6 feet (1.8 m) high. Each pier has a moulded cornice and a ball finial. Between the piers are wrought iron gates dating from the 20th century.	II
Malcoff Farmhouse; 53.34190°N 1.89344°W	—	18th century	The farmhouse, which was refronted in the 19th century, is in gritstone with quoins and a stone slate roof. There are two storeys, three bays, and a single-storey outshut to the north. The windows vary; some are mullioned, some are top-hung casements, and there is a sash window.	II
Old Brook House; 53.30275°N 1.93684°W		18th century	The house, which incorporates parts of a 17th-century house, is in gritstone with quoins, and a stone slate roof. There are two storeys and attics, and a symmetrical front of three bays. In the centre is a doorway with a massive stone surround, and the windows are sashes. At the rear are a horizontally-sliding sash window, a stair window, and a four-light mullioned window.	II
The Royal Oak Inn; 53.32316°N 1.91540°W		18th century	The public house, which was remodelled in the 19th century, is in incised rendered stone, on a plinth, with painted stone dressings, quoins, a parapet, and a tile roof. There are three storeys and three bays, with a two-storey single-bay wing on the left. The central doorway has engaged columns, a fanlight, and a plain entablature, and the windows are casements.	II
The Smithy; 53.33271°N 1.90035°W		18th century	The house, once an outbuilding of Bowden Hall, is in gritstone with quoins and a hipped stone slate roof. There are two storeys and two bays. The west front contains three-light mullioned and transomed windows in the ground floor, and three-light mullioned windows above. In the east front are two doorways with large jambs, imposts and lintels, and a cantilevered staircase to an upper floor doorway.	II
Village Stocks; 53.32345°N 1.91551°W		18th century	The village stocks are in Market Place. They consist of two upright gritstone posts with deep grooves. They contain four timbers with holes for arms and legs, and at the south is a wooden bench.	II
Barn southwest of Martinside; 53.31155°N 1.90095°W	—	1773	A gritstone barn with quoins, and a stone slate roof with moulded gable copings, kneelers, and two gabled dormers. In the north front is a doorway over which is a datestone, and the south front contains three doorways with quoined chamfered surrounds and heavy lintels. In the gable end wall is a doorway with a segmental arch, and a doorway and a window, both with quoined chamfered surrounds.	II
16 High Street; 53.32292°N 1.91770°W		Late 18th century	The house is in gritstone with painted dressings, quoins, a wooden eaves gutter, and a stone slate roof. There are two storeys and two bays. The central doorway has a quoined surround and a rectangular fanlight. The windows on the front are sashes, and at the rear are mullioned windows.	II
The Old Farmhouse; 53.31327°N 1.95793°W		Late 18th century	The farmhouse is in gritstone with chamfered quoins, and a slate roof. There are two storeys, and an L-shaped plan, with a front range of three bays. In the centre is a round-headed doorway with a moulded architrave and a fanlight. The windows on the front are 20th-century replacements, and at the rear is a mullioned window.	II
Outbuildings, Top O' Th' Plane; 53.31981°N 1.89983°W	—	1796	Originally the workshops of the Peak Forest Tramway, built by Benjamin Outram, and later used for other purposes, it is in gritstone with quoins, and slate roofs with coped gables. There is a single storey and an L-shaped plan. The building contains tram doors with rusicated segmental-headed surrounds, and windows.	II
Stodhart Tunnel; 53.33034°N 1.91319°W		1796	The entrance to the tramway tunnel on the Peak Forest Tramway was built by Benjamin Outram. It is in gritstone, and consists of concave walling about 4 metres (13 ft) high, containing a segmental arch about 2 metres (6 ft 7 in) high. The arch has jambs and voussoirs, the tunnel extends for about 200 yards (180 m) into the hillside, and the other end is blocked and the portal has been demolished.	II*
Ollerenshaw Hall; 53.32387°N 1.96261°W		c. 1800	The house was extended in 1840 and has been divided into three dwellings. It is in gritstone with quoins, a sill band, a moulded eaves cornice, and a hipped slate roofs. There are two storeys and eight bays. The windows are sashes, some tripartite, and almost all the openings have architraves.	II
Laneside Farmhouse; 53.33090°N 1.92786°W	—	1817	A farmhouse in gritstone with quoins and a stone slate roof. There are two storeys and two bays. The central doorway has a quoined surround, a rectangular fanlight, and a hood mould. The windows are mullioned, and between the upper floor windows is an initialled datestone.	II
Hearse House; 53.32404°N 1.91301°W		1818	An undertaker's premises, later used for other purposes, it is in gritstone, with quoins and a stone slate roof. There are two storeys, and the gable end faces the street. The front contains an arched entrance with large imposts and a dropped keystone. Above the arch is an inscribed and dated plaque, and a circular window with four keystones, On the right side are external steps leading to a doorway.	II
27 Market Street; 53.32342°N 1.91447°W	—	Early 19th century	A shop with residential accommodation above, it is in red brick with vitrified headers, and a hipped tile roof. There are two storeys and attics, and three bays, the middle bay slightly projecting. The central doorway has a rectangular fanlight, and above it is an arch with imposts and a keystone. In the outer bays are modern shop fronts, and the upper floors contain sash windows.	II
3 Terrace Road; 53.32356°N 1.91510°W	—	Early 19th century	The house is in gritstone with a stone slate roof. There are three storeys and one bay. Steps lead to the doorway, and the windows are small-paned.	II
5 Terrace Road; 53.32358°N 1.91505°W	—	Early 19th century	A gritstone house with quoins and a stone slate roof. There are three storeys and two bays. Three steps lead to a central doorway with flush jambs and a lintel. The windows on the front are sashes, and at the rear are two mullioned windows, one with a massive triangular lintel.	II
Bowden Hall Cottage; 53.33235°N 1.89959°W		Early 19th century	The cottage is in gritstone with quoins and a stone slate roof. There are two storeys and two bays. On the front is a doorway, and the windows are mullioned with arched lights.	II
Stabling, Bowden Hall; 53.33265°N 1.89987°W		Early 19th century	The stable block is in gritstone, with rusticated quoins, and a hipped slate roof. There are three storeys, an L-shaped plan, and five bays. In the ground floor are blocked rectangular openings with inset semi-ovoid windows, a doorway with a quoined surround and a fanlight, and a segmental arch. The upper floors contain small-pane windows, and in the centre of the top floor is a clock face with a chamfered surround. On the roof is a bellcote with a domed top and a ball and steeple finial.	II
Bridge south of White Hall Gates; 53.3363°N 1.94573°W	—	Early 19th century	The bridge, which carries a road over Black Brook, is in gritstone, and consists of a single segmental arch. The arch has a span of about 12 feet (3.7 m), radiating voussoirs, curved spandrels, a flat string course, and a slightly arched parapet with rectangular copings. At the ends are full height pilasters.	II
Eccles House; 53.33126°N 1.94806°W	—	Early 19th century	The house is in rendered stone, with quoins, and roofs mainly of slate with some stone slate. There are two storeys and five bays, with a cross roof on the front and triple ridges at the rear. On the west front is a porch with Doric columns, an entablature, and a semicircular doorway with inset Doric columns and a fanlight. The windows are sashes.	II
Garden House; 53.33708°N 1.88734°W	—	Early 19th century	A gritstone house with quoins and a tile roof. There are two storeys and four bays. The doorway has a quoined surround and a semicircular fanlight, and the windows on the front are sash windows. At the rear are mullioned windows.	II
Milepost, Rushup Edge; 53.33991°N 1.85959°W		Early 19th century	The milepost is on the south side of Sheffield Road, it is in cast iron, and about 3 feet (0.91 m) high. It has a triangular section with a pointed arched top and a curving top panel. The milepost is inscribed with the distances to Chapel-en-le-Frith, Sheffield, Hathersage and Castleton.	II
Rushup Hall; 53.33626°N 1.85853°W		Early 19th century	A gritstone house on a shallow plinth, with rusticated quoins, moulded eaves corbels, and a hipped stone slate roof. There are three storeys and three bays. The central doorway has a bracketed cornice, the windows on the front are sashes, and at the rear are mullioned windows.	II
Sparkbottom Farmhouse; 53.32010°N 1.95132°W		Early 19th century	The farmhouse is in gritstone with bracketed eaves and a slate roof. There are two storeys and three bays. The central doorway has a bracketed hood, the windows on the front are sashes, and at the rear are mullioned windows.	II
Stodhart Lodge; 53.33081°N 1.91266°W	—	Early 19th century	The house, which was extended in 1869, is in gritstone on a shallow plinth, with a moulded eaves cornice, and slate roofs, some hipped, with coped gables, moulded kneelers, and pineapple finials. There are two storeys and attics, and an irregular plan. The south front has six bays, and contains a porch with slender Doric columns, a plain entablature, and a semicircular-headed doorway with a fanlight. Above it is a semicircular-headed stair window, and the other windows are sashes. The extension is in Gothic style.	II
The Coach House; 53.33734°N 1.88754°W	—	Early 19th century	A house and garage, originally the coach house to Ford Hall, it is in gritstone with quoins, gutter corbels, and a stone slate roof with moulded copings and moulded kneelers. There is an L-shaped plan, the house has two storeys and a gabled front, and the garage to the left has one storey. In the house is a round-headed doorway with a quoined surround and a fanlight. The garage contains a semicircular arch with a chamfered and quoined surround, and a doorway with a quoined surround and semicircular head. The windows are sashes, and in the house they are tripartite.	II
White Hall gates, gate piers and railings 53.33652°N 1.94561°W		Early 19th century	Flanking the entrance to the drive are gritstone piers about 8 feet (2.4 m) high, and outside the pedestrian entrances are similar lower piers. The piers are octagonal, and have moulded shallow pitched cone tops, and flanking these are low stone walls. The railings on the walls and the gates are decorative and in cast iron.	II
Bridge, Bank Hall Drive; 53.31353°N 1.92259°W	—	1830	The bridge carrying the drive over a stream is in gritstone and consists of a single low arch. It has a flat string course, low parapets with decorative curved copings, a datestone, and low square pilasters at the ends with decorative carving.	II
Toll Bar Cottage; 53.33429°N 1.88751°W		1830s	The former toll house is in gritstone, and has a stone slate roof with coped gables and moulded kneelers. There is a single storey and three bays. In the centre is a doorway with a four-centred arched head. This is flanked by lancet windows, and in the west gable end is a three-light mullioned window. All the openings have moulded hood moulds.	II
Slack Hall; 53.33008°N 1.89125°W		c. 1835	The house is in gritstone on a shallow plinth, with a sill band, and a hipped slate roof. There are two storeys and three bays. The middle bay projects slightly, and contains a portico with Doric columns, a plain entablature, a moulded cornice, a low parapet, and a shallow pediment. The windows are sashes.	II
Primary School; 53.32255°N 1.91815°W		1839	The school is in gritstone, with a coved eaves band, and a slate roof with coped gables and large kneelers. It consists of a central gabled block with two storeys and two bays, flanked by single-storey three-bay wings. The central doorway has a chamfered surround, a four-centred arched head and a hood mould. Above it is a coved string course, a large mullioned and transomed window, a dated plaque, and a finial on the gable. The other windows are mullioned, and all have hood moulds, and lights with pointed heads.	II
The Vicarage; 53.32256°N 1.91754°W		c. 1840	The house is in gritstone with a moulded string course, a parapet, and a slate roof with coped gables and finials. There are two storeys and a south front of three bays. The middle bay projects slightly under a gable, and contains a canted bay window with an embattled parapet. Some windows are sashes, and others are mullioned, or mullioned and transomed.	II
Bowden Hall; 53.33218°N 1.90030°W		1844	The house, designed by Richard Lane in Tudor Revival style, is in gritstone, and has a slate roof with moulded gable copings. There are two storeys and three bays. The south front has two gables and a two-storey porch containing a doorway with a chamfered surround and a four-centred arch, and a door with a fanlight. Above it is a hood mould that continues as a string course. To the east is a tripartite window with a hood mould, and to the west is a canted bay window that has a parapet with moulded copings. The windows are sashes.	II
Chestnut Farmhouse; 53.33418°N 1.88783°W		Mid-19th century	The farmhouse is in gritstone, with a stone slate roof, two storeys and two bays. Step lead up to the central doorway that has plain jambs and imposts, and the windows are sashes.	II
Mounting block and dog kennel 53.30696°N 1.94914°W	—	19th century (probable)	The mounting block incorporating a dog kennel is in gritstone, and has a triangular plan with five steps on two sides. In the centre is an arch with a moulded architrave and a hood mould. On the front are various carved motifs.	II
Former Williams and Glynn's Bank; 53.32312°N 1.91566°W		19th century	The former bank is in gritstone with a stone slate roof. There are two storeys and five bays, the ground floor in Art Nouveau style. In the left bay is a doorway with a chamfered and moulded surround, and an inscribed lintel. In the other bays are windows with moulded architraves and keystones, and a decorated panel below. Above the windows is a decorative string course, the decorations continuing between the windows.	II
Methodist Junior School; 53.32447°N 1.90871°W	—	1853	The school was extended to the south in 1887 and in 1929. It is in gritstone, with the roof partly slated and partly tiled. In the original part is a semicircular-headed window with imposts and a keystone. To the south is a doorway with a rectangular fanlight and a hood mould, over which is a datestone. The extensions to the south have three and five windows.	II
Bank Hall; 53.30671°N 1.92439°W		c. 1857	The house was remodelled in the 1870s, including a room designed by W. E. Nesfield. It is built in gritstone, partly rusticated, with quoins, bracketed overhanging eaves, and a hipped slate roof, and there are two storeys. In the south front is a central Venetian-style doorway with columns, voussoirs with floral decoration, and a rusticated surround. This is flanked by full-height canted bay windows with sashes, above which is a string course. Over the doorway is an elaborate balcony on fluted brackets, and a sash window with a moulded architrave.	II
Gates, gate piers and screen, Bank Hall; 53.30665°N 1.92504°W		1867	The gate piers are in stone. A pair of piers flank the carriage entrance, to the left is a pier by the pedestrian entrance, and curving low walls end in piers. Each pier is square with a moulded base, a rectangular panel containing decorative beading and flower motifs, a moulded cornice, and a pyramidal cap; the end piers are smaller and less decorative. The gates and the screen on the low walls are in cast iron, and are decorative, the screen less than the gates.	II
Chapel-en-le-Frith railway station 53.31222°N 1.91882°W	.	1867	The railway station was built by the Midland Railway and designed by Edward Walters. It closed in 1967 and has been converted for residential use. The building is in gritstone on a plinth, with quoins, overhanging eaves, and a slate roof. There is a single storey and a two-storey cross wing, and three bays. The windows are sashes, some tripartite with a slightly curved arch and voussoirs, and others have two semicircular-headed lights.	II
Townend Methodist Church; 53.32451°N 1.90903°W		1872–74	The church is in gritstone with a slate roof. It consists of a nave, north and south transepts, a north porch, and a tower on the northwest corner. The tower has a square lower stage, an octagonal upper stage with bell openings, and an overhanging octagonal spire. In the transepts are rose windows.	II
Bank Hall Lodge; 53.31135°N 1.92149°W		c. 1873	The lodge was designed by W. E. Nesfield. It is in gritstone, the upper parts are timber framed, partly tile-hung, partly pargeted, with bracketed overhanging eaves, and a slate roof with terracotta ridge tiles, and a spiral finial with a flower head. There are two storeys and attics, and two jettied gables, the larger one coved at the base.	II
Gateway, Stodhart Lodge; 53.33039°N 1.91323°W	—	c. 1898	The gateway is in gritstone and consists of an embattled wall on a plinth with pilasters. It contains a doorway with a pointed arch, voussoirs and quoins, and on each side is a cast iron lion's head set into the masonry. Above the arch is an inscribed stone panel, a string course on corbels, between the battlements are three inscribed plaques, and at the top is a carved seated lion.	II
Chapel-en-le-Frith War Memorial; 53.32324°N 1.91584°W		1919	The war memorial is in gritstone, and consists of a square pier on a shallow plinth, with a coved cornice, and a domed top with acanthus leaves and roundels. On each corner is a diagonal buttress, stepped and curved at the top. There is an inscription on the base, and on the sides of the pier are the names of those lost in the First World War. The memorial is in an enclosure with four wrought iron columns with scrolled tops and bases, and linked by chains.	II
Dove Holes War Memorial; 53.29882°N 1.88761°W		1927	The war memorial is approached by steps and is in a raised hedged enclosure on the west side of Halsteads (A6 road). It is in stone, and consists of a wheel-head cross on an octagonal shaft with a square collar and a moulded foot. This stands on an octagonal chamfered plinth and a two-stepped base. On the front of the cross is cusped tracery. On the plinth are inscriptions, and the names of those lost in the two World Wars.	II
