= Chapel-en-le-Frith railway station =

Railway station in Derbyshire, England

Chapel-en-le-Frith
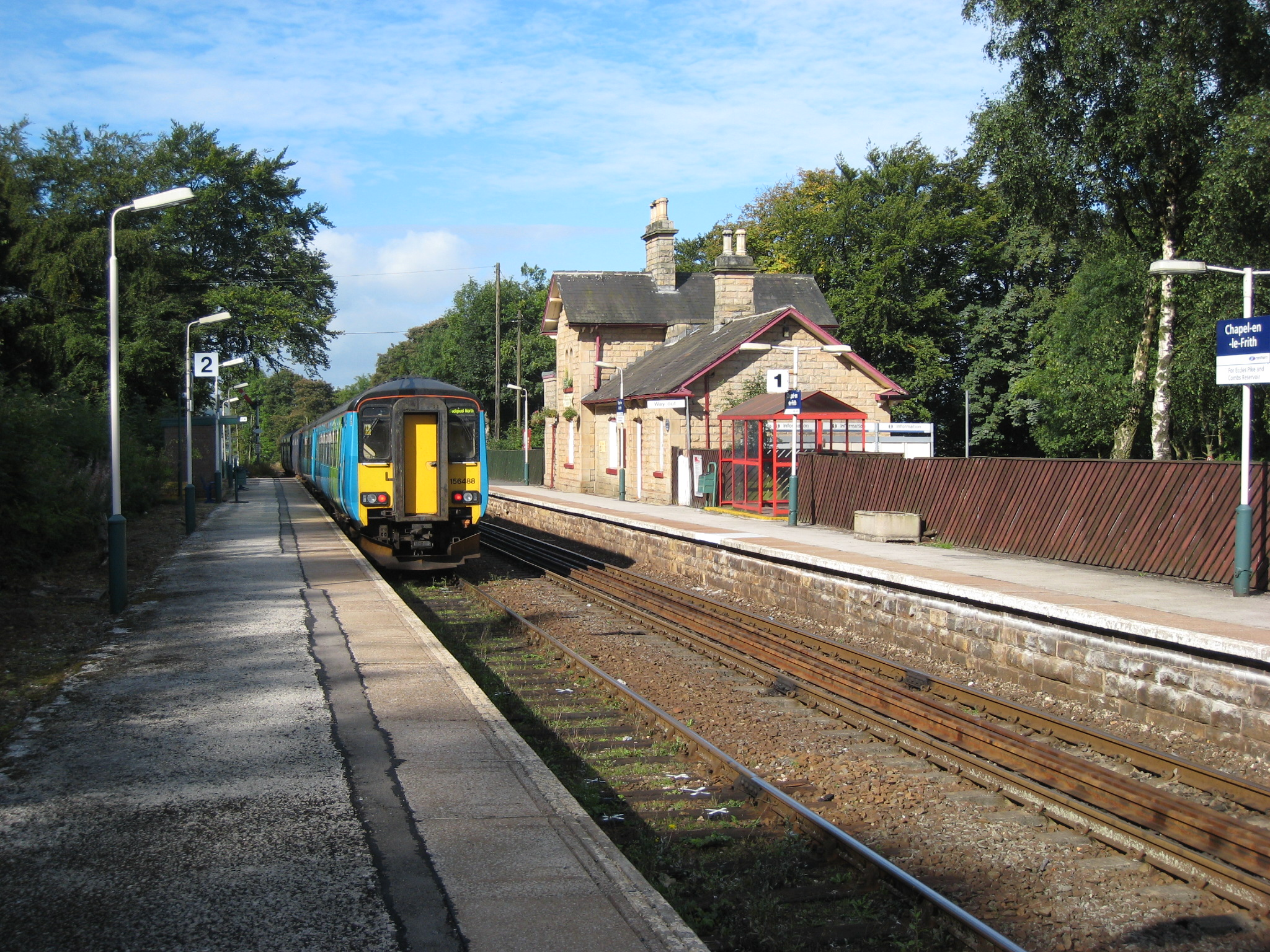

General information
- Location: Chapel-en-le-Frith, High Peak; England
- Coordinates: 53.312°N 1.919°W
- Grid reference: SK055794
- Managed by: Northern Trains
- Platforms: 2

Other information
- Station code: CEF
- Classification: DfT category F2

History
- Opened: 1863

Passengers
- 2020/21: ▼20,680
- 2021/22: ▲60,208
- 2022/23: ▲64,718
- 2023/24: ▲74,536
- 2024/25: ▲77,786
Location
Notes
- Passenger statistics from the Office of Rail and Road

Chapel-en-le-Frith railway station (formerly Chapel-en-le-Frith South) serves the Peak District town of Chapel-en-le-Frith, in Derbyshire, England. It is sited 20 1/2 mi (33.0 km) south-east of Manchester Piccadilly on the Buxton Line.

== History ==
The station was built in 1863 for the London & North Western Railway, on its line from Whaley Bridge to Buxton as an extension of the Stockport, Disley and Whaley Bridge Railway.

In 1867, the Midland Railway built a station (known as Chapel-en-le-Frith Central) on the Sheffield and Midland Railway Companies' Committee line from Millers Dale to Chinley. The town therefore had a main line connection from Manchester to London, featuring expresses such as the Palatine and the Peaks. However, with the closure of the former Midland route from Chinley to Rowsley to passenger traffic in 1967, Central station was closed. The Midland line is still in-situ and used for freight to and from Peak Forest.

The station is one of very few to retain its walkway to cross between platforms; most stations having had footbridges installed. The prime reason for this is the requirement to provide a vehicular crossing for those houses further up the hill which have no reliable alternative; it is blocked for days during snow and, even when open, requires a considerable extra distance to be covered to reach the town centre. A footbridge would therefore not be used.

The former stationmaster's house was used as a restaurant called Brief Encounter, but has been refurbished and is being used as a band room for Chapel-en-le-Frith Town Band.

=== Accident ===
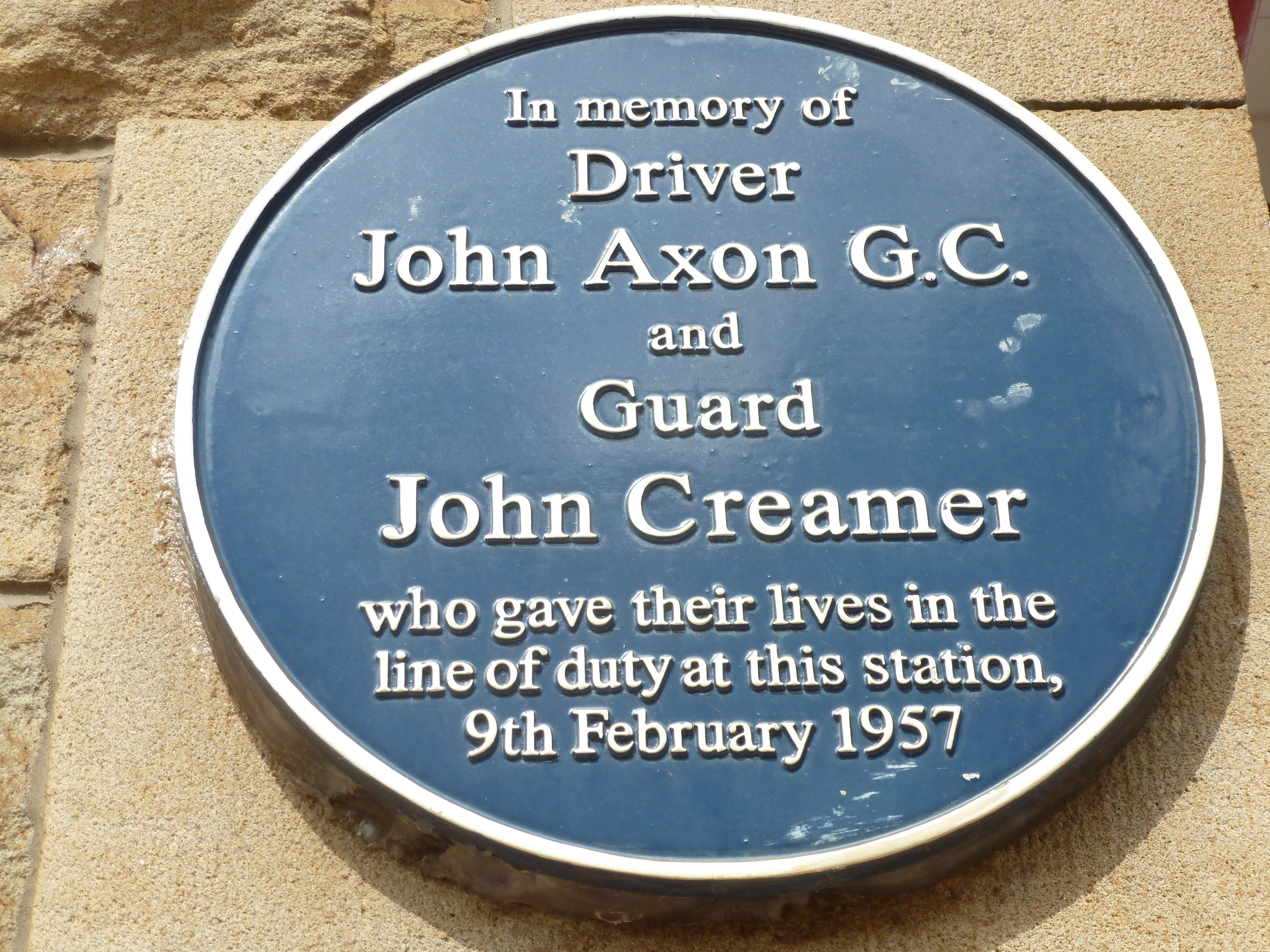
Plaque commemorating John Axon and John Creamer, the two victims of the collision

The station was the site of a fatal collision in 1957, which is commemorated with a plaque at the station.

== Facilities ==
The station is unstaffed, but has a ticket machine which also allows the collection of pre-booked tickets. There are waiting shelters on both platforms and train running information is provided by automated announcements, CIS displays, timetable poster boards and a customer help point on platform 1. Step-free access is available to both sides via the foot crossing at the Whaley Bridge end of the station.

== Service ==
Northern Trains operates a generally hourly service in each direction between Manchester Piccadilly, Stockport and Buxton.

Preceding station	National Rail	Following station
Dove Holes	Northern Buxton line	Whaley Bridge

== See also ==
- Listed buildings in Chapel-en-le-Frith
