= John Axon (actor) =

English actor (1960–2008)

- Born: 10 September 1960; Stockport, England
- Died: 25 October 2008 (aged 48); Stockport, England
- Occupation: Actor
- Years active: 1993–2008
- Family: John Axon (grandfather)

John Axon (10 September 1960 – 25 October 2008) was an English television and stage actor. Axon trained at the Guildhall school of music and drama after briefly training as a graphic designer. He had a small part in Peter Kay's Phoenix Nights series 1 episode 3. He was perhaps best known for his role as the hospital administrator, Nigel Harper, on the ITV1 television series The Royal. Axon played Harper as a recurring role on the show from 2003 until 2005. Other television credits include Prime Suspect, City Central, Lilies and Monsignor Renard.

Axon was named after his grandfather, John Axon, an engine driver who was posthumously awarded the George Cross in 1957 after he died while attempting to stop his train before it crashed at Chapel-en-le-Frith.

His theatre credits included Dimas in The Triumph of Love, which opened at the Royal Exchange in Manchester in 2007. He travelled to Hungary in 2008 where he filmed an American television series, Kröd Mändoon and the Flaming Sword of Fire, starring Matt Lucas.

Axon collapsed and died of a suspected heart attack near his home in Stockport on 25 October 2008 at the age of 48. He was preparing to play a ballroom dancer in the comedy drama television series, Shameless, at the time of his death. Axon was a Stockport County season ticket holder. He never married and had no children.
