= Furness Vale railway station =

Railway station in Derbyshire, England

Coordinates: 53.349°N 1.989°W

Furness Vale
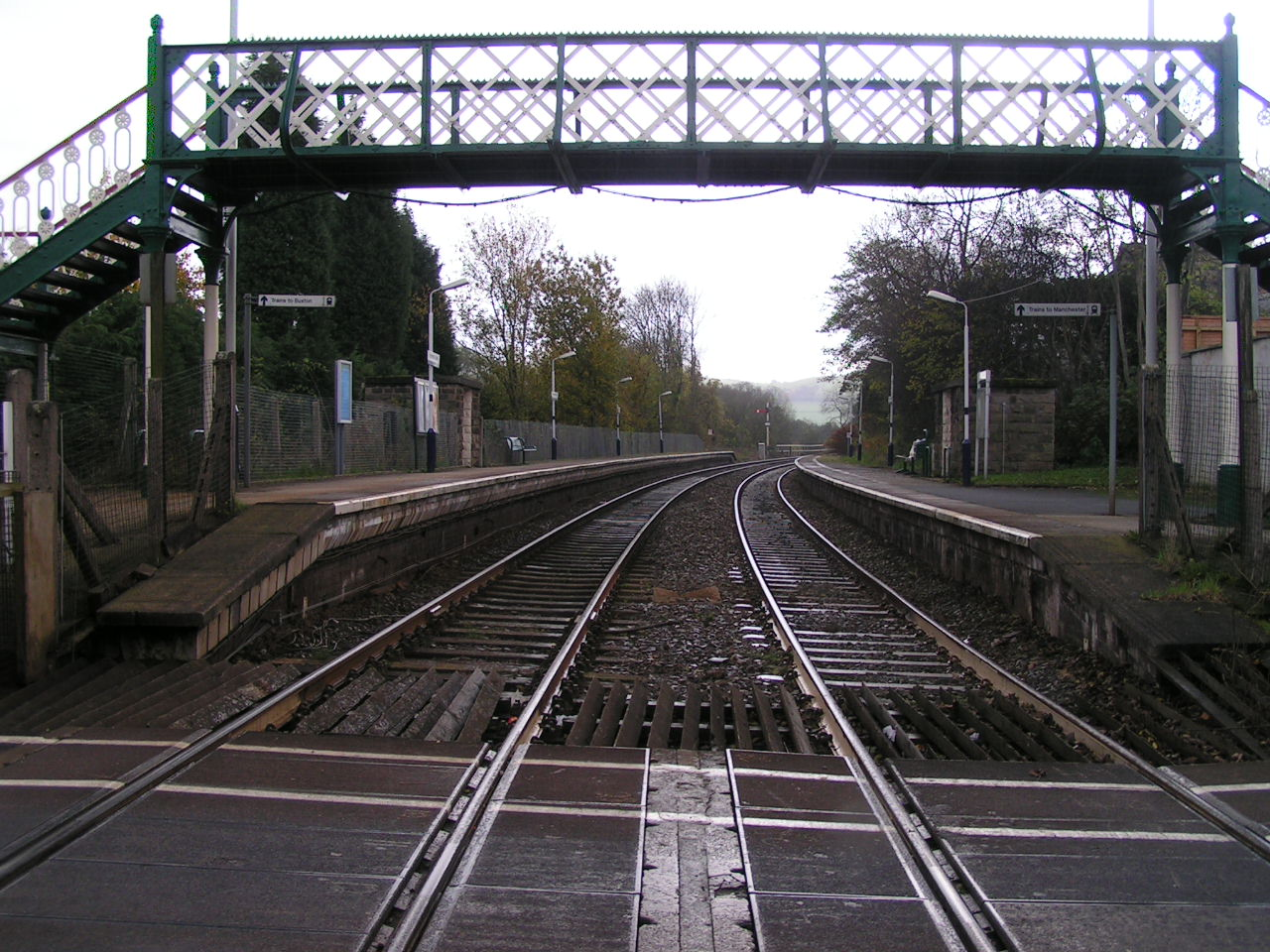
- The station in 2005

General information
- Location: Furness Vale, High Peak; England
- Grid reference: SK008835
- Manager: Northern Trains
- Platforms: 2

Other information
- Station code: FNV
- Classification: DfT category F2

History
- Opened: 1857

Passengers
- 2021/22: ▲19,262
- 2022/23: ▲20,026
- 2023/24: ▲22,750
- 2024/25: ▲25,792
- 2025/26: ▼24,976
Location
Notes
- Passenger statistics from the Office of Rail and Road

Furness Vale railway station serves the village of Furness Vale, in Derbyshire, England. It is sited 15 1/4 miles (24.5 km) south-east of Manchester Piccadilly on the Buxton line.

== History ==
The station was built in 1857 by the London and North Western Railway on the Stockport, Disley and Whaley Bridge Railway line, to connect with the Cromford and High Peak Railway. The line was extended to Buxton in 1863.

== Facilities ==
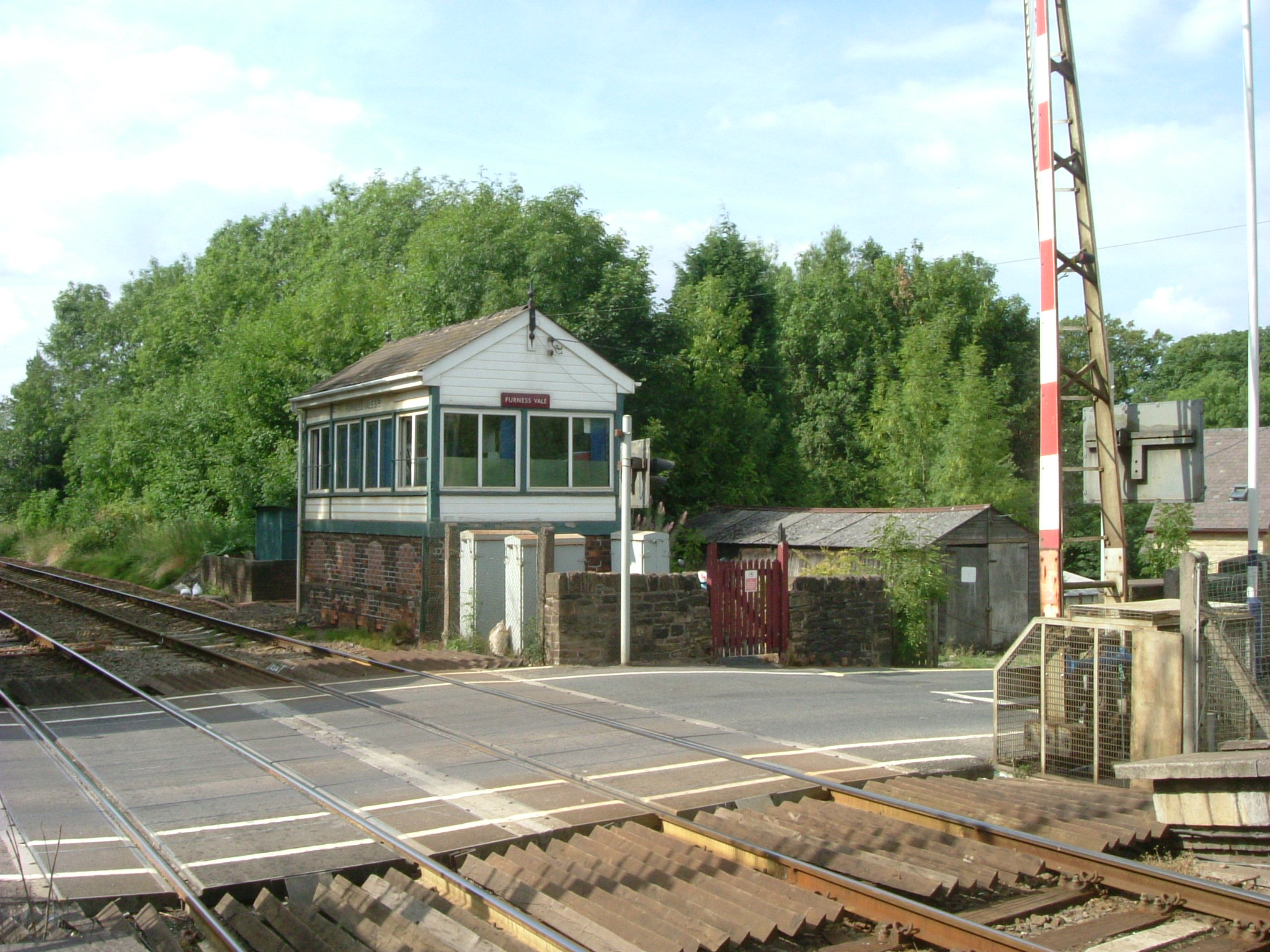
The level crossing and signal box

The station has no permanent buildings other than basic shelters. It is unstaffed and has a ticket machine on the Manchester platform; tickets must be bought prior to travel or on the train. Service running information is offered via automatic announcements and timetable posters.

The platforms are linked by footbridge, but there is step-free access via the level crossing to both platforms.

It has a level crossing at the end of the platform, controlled by a signal box.

== Service ==
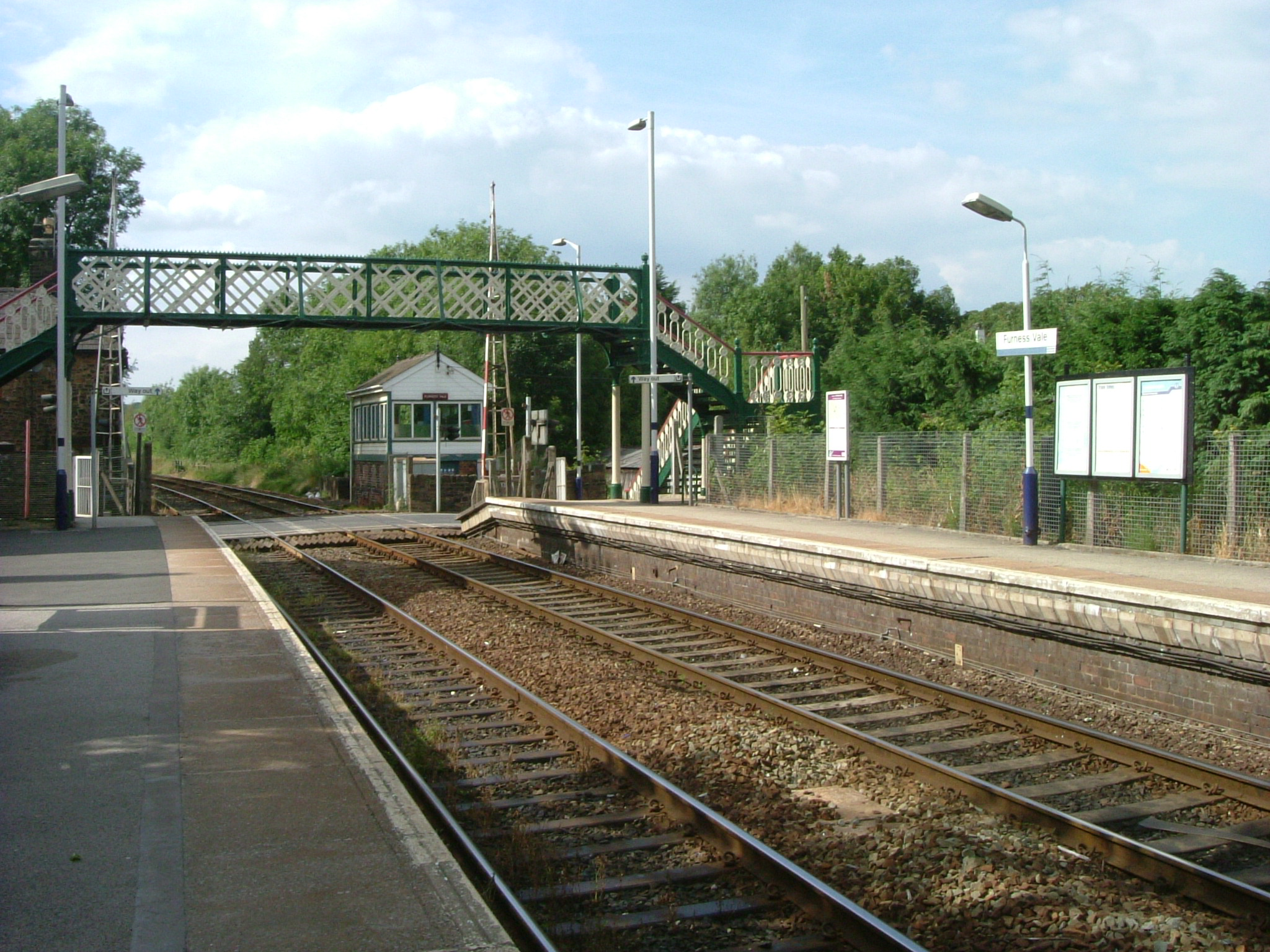
The station platforms

Northern Trains operates a generally hourly service in each direction between Manchester Piccadilly, Stockport and Buxton.

| Preceding station | National Rail | Following station |
|---|---|---|
| Whaley Bridge | Northern Buxton line | New Mills Newtown |
