= Buxton line =

Railway line in north-west England

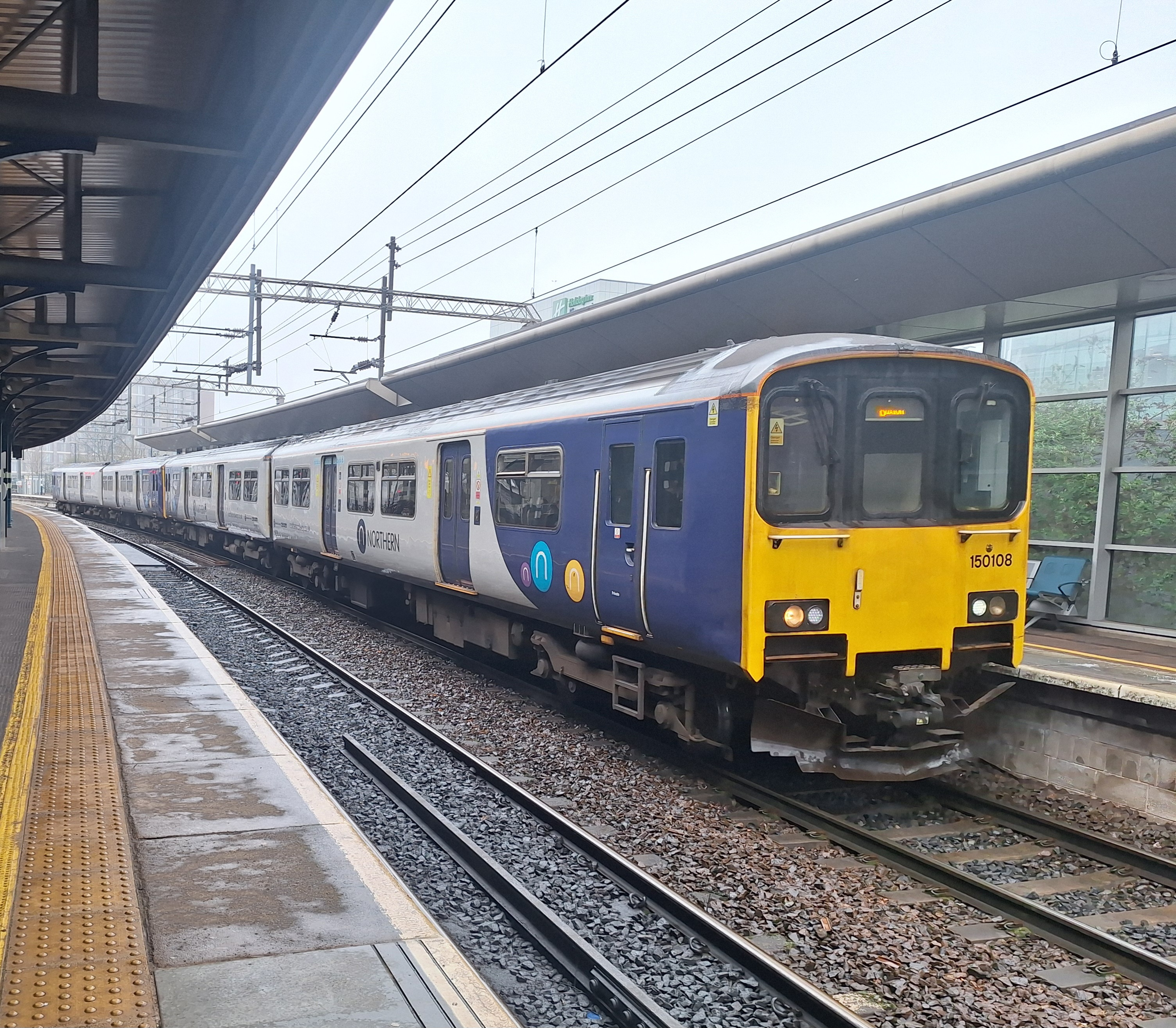
- A Northern Trains Class 150 at Stockport railway station, March 2025

Overview
- Status: Operational
- Owner: Network Rail
- Termini: Manchester Piccadilly; Buxton
- Stations: 15

Service
- System: National Rail
- Operator: Northern Trains
- Depot: Newton Heath TMD
- Rolling stock: Class 150, Class 156, Class 323

History
- Opened: 1860s

Technical
- Line length: 19 miles (31 km)
- Number of tracks: 2
- Track gauge: 4 ft 8 1/2 in (1,435 mm) standard gauge
- Electrification: 25 kV 50 Hz AC (north of Hazel Grove only)
- Operating speed: up to 60 mph (97 km/h)
Route map
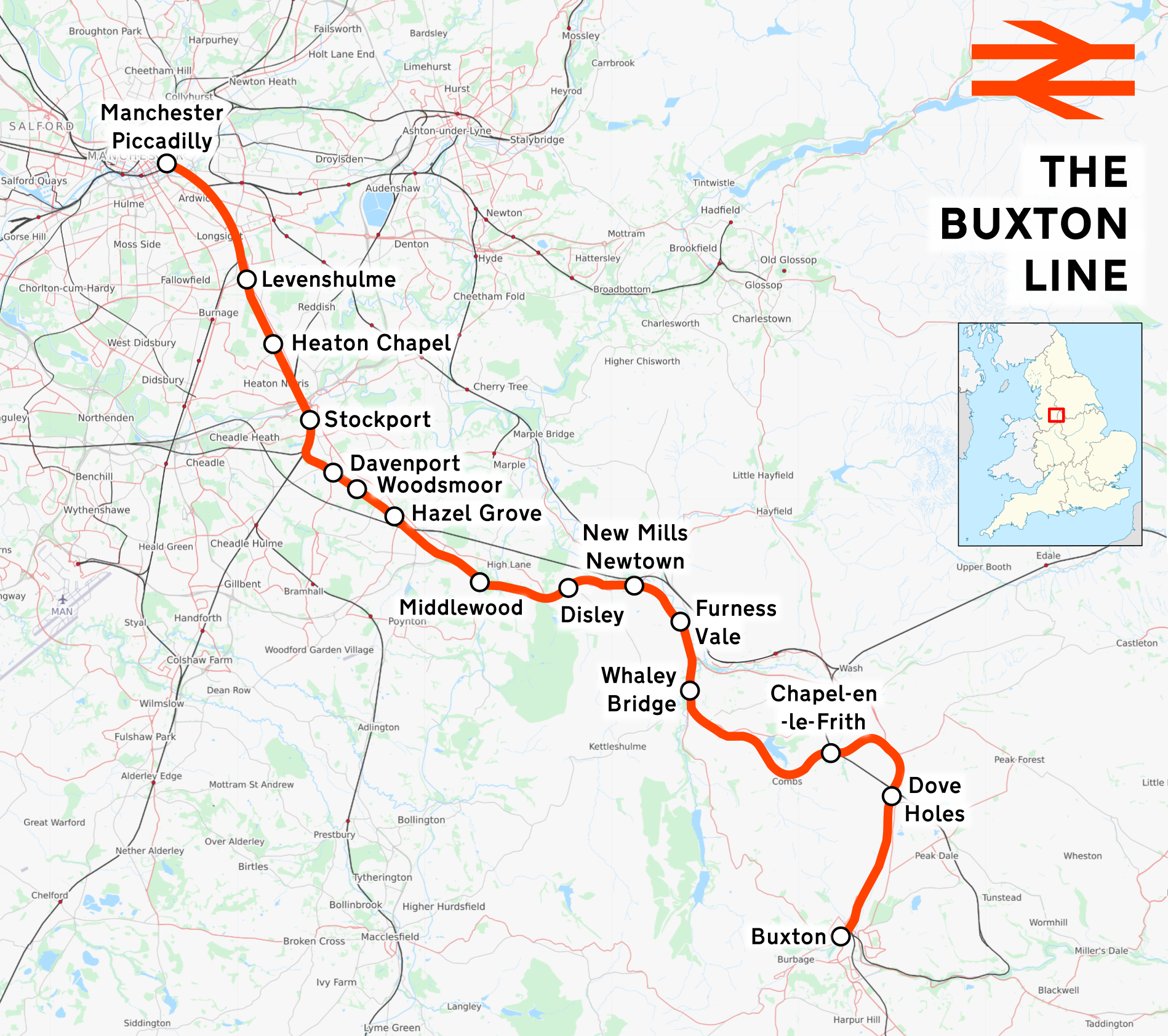
(Click to expand)

The Buxton line is a railway line in North West England, connecting Manchester and Stockport with Buxton in Derbyshire. Passenger services on the line are currently operated by Northern Trains.

== History ==
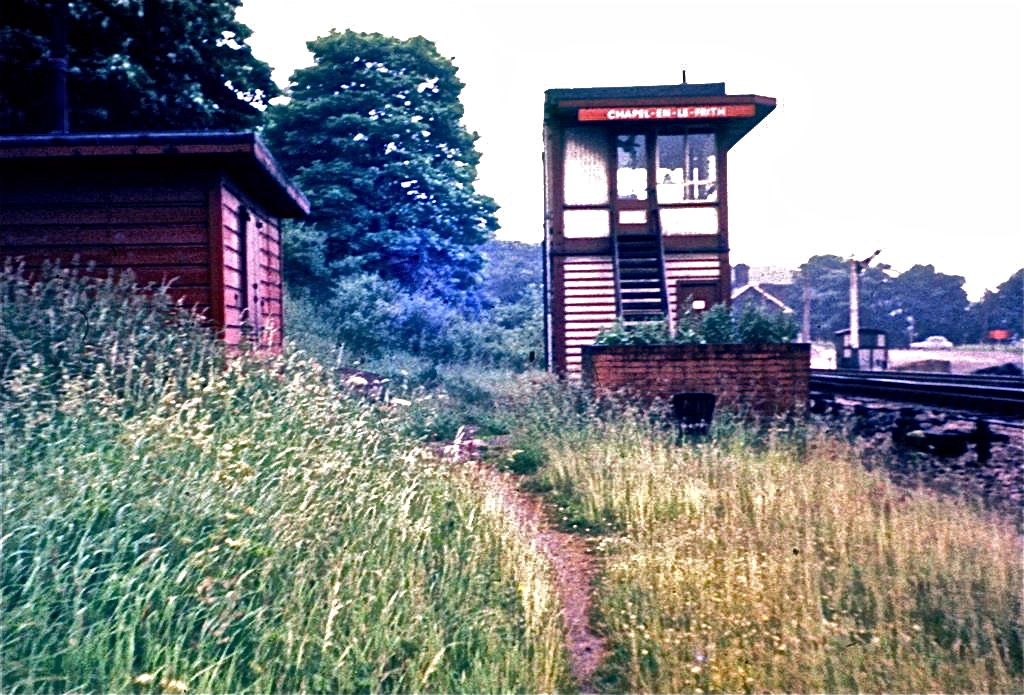
Chapel-en-le-Frith South signal box in 1967; it was rebuilt after the 1957 accident

The line has its origins with the Stockport, Disley and Whaley Bridge Railway, which the London and North Western Railway (LNWR) built to connect with the Cromford and High Peak Railway at Whaley Bridge. In 1863, it built an extension from Whaley Bridge to Buxton, via Chapel-en-le-Frith. This forestalled the Manchester, Sheffield and Lincolnshire Railway's plans for the area, and also the Midland Railway's attempts to reach Manchester.

The latter two railways were forced to combine forces in a line following the LNWR, but north of it, through New Mills (part of what is now known as the Hope Valley Line), branching at Millers Dale. As a result, Buxton never achieved main line status, despite being one of the largest towns in the Peak District.

The LNWR had offered the use of the line but, with its climb through Dove Holes, the Midland did not consider it useful for express trains, saying that it went up a steep hill merely for the sake of going down. The LNWR may have saved costs in construction but it proved difficult to operate, even with the powerful locomotives they had been forced to introduce for their lines north of Manchester. In later days, a 17-mile (27 km) stretch was operated using banking engines, the longest such section on the British railway system.

From 8 October 1956, services on the line were in the hands of Class 104 diesel multiple units based at Buxton depot, though some remained steam worked for longer (for example, the 08:20 train to Manchester switched to diesel on 17 June 1957).

In 1957, there was a serious accident at Chapel-en-le-Frith in which driver John Axon died at his post attempting to control a runaway goods train; as a result, he received the George Cross medal posthumously.

The Beeching cuts threatened closure, but the line was reprieved at a hearing in 1964. In its 1964 accounts, British Rail counted the cost of the reprieve at £133,000 (£2.4m at 2014 prices) in a full year, plus £44,000 which could have been saved if freight was also withdrawn.

The line was electrified, at 25 kV AC overhead, between Manchester and Hazel Grove in 1981. A chord just south of Hazel Grove was built in 1986, allowing trains to change from the Hope Valley Line and thus faster running into Manchester Piccadilly. Colour light signalling, controlled from LNWR-built boxes at Edgeley Junction and Hazel Grove, cover the line as far as Norbury crossing, which itself has a small hut controlling two semaphore signals in the Middlewood area. Further south, signalling is mostly semaphore and is controlled from signal-boxes at Furness Vale, Chapel-en-le-Frith and Buxton.

In June 2016, a landslip at Middlewood station following heavy rain meant that all services were suspended between Hazel Grove and Buxton until 25 June. A rail replacement bus service was in operation during the closure.

On 31 July 2019, the line was closed between Hazel Grove and Buxton amid fears that the earthwork dam at Toddbrook Reservoir would collapse following heavy rain, which would flood the town of Whaley Bridge. The Hope Valley Line between Marple and Sheffield was also closed because of this; bus replacements were in operation between Buxton and Macclesfield during the closure. The line was reopened on 8 August.

== Station facilities ==
Passenger information systems have been installed at most stations on the line since 2011, including the terminus at Buxton, Hazel Grove, New Mills Newtown and Whaley Bridge.

== Route ==
At Edgeley Junction, the 19-mile (31 km) branch leaves the West Coast Main Line 1/2 mile (0.8 km) south of Stockport and curves sharply east. At the end of the curve, a spur linked it to Cheadle and the Stockport, Timperley and Altrincham Junction Railway until the 1960s; it opened to goods on 12 December 1883 and to passengers on 1 July 1884.

Just beyond Hazel Grove, 2 1/2 miles (4.0 km) from Edgeley Junction, a 1986 junction links the line with the Hope Valley Line through Disley Tunnel; it had been planned originally in 1933. The line then climbs at 1 in 60 for 3 1/4 miles (5.2 km) to Disley. At Middlewood, there was a junction (from 26 May 1885 to 1954) to allow trains to run between Buxton and Macclesfield via the Macclesfield, Bollington and Marple Railway. East of that junction, the line passes in a short tunnel under the Macclesfield Canal. 1 mile (1.6 km) east it runs in a cutting across the edge of Lyme Park, home of Thomas Legh, first Chairman of the Stockport, Disley and Whaley Bridge Railway.

Just east of Disley station, the line runs through another short tunnel into the Goyt Valley, which it gently drops down to Furness Vale, running close to and parallel to the Hope Valley Line, Peak Forest Canal and A6. At Whaley Bridge, the line joined the Cromford and High Peak Railway, the link to Shallcross Yard remaining until January 1965.

The line subsequently leaves the Goyt Valley to climb 6 miles (9.7 km) at 1 in 60 or 1 in 58 to Dove Holes. The line runs near Combs Reservoir, through the 110-yard (100 m) Barmoor Clough Tunnel, beside the former Peak Forest Tramway, descends 2 miles (3.2 km) (mostly at 1 in 66). It passes through the site of Fairfield Halt; a platform on the up side only, 1/2 mile [0.8 km] from Buxton, which closed in September 1939. The line continues through the junctions to the Ashbourne and Midland lines, reaching its destination at Buxton.

== Service ==
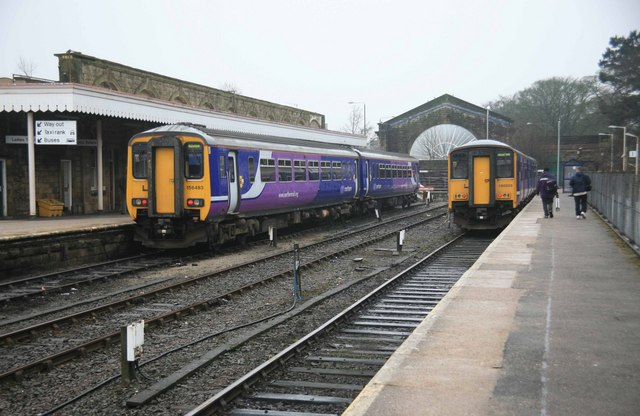
Class 156 and 150/2 units at Buxton, the line's southern terminus

Services between Manchester Piccadilly, Stockport and Buxton operate two-hourly on Sundays and hourly all other days, with a half-hourly service at peak times. These are worked by Class 150 and 156 diesel multiple units (DMUs). Class 158 DMUs were once blocked from operating on the line to Buxton, due to the possibility of the large roof-mounted air vents striking low bridges on the route.

Services between Manchester Piccadilly and Hazel Grove operate hourly, using Class 150 and 156s; until 2008, Class 323s were employed, with Class 319s until 2020, and Class 331 electric multiple units until the timetable change in December 2022. Before the timetable change, services were extended to Blackpool North service to give Davenport, Woodsmoor and Hazel Grove stations thrice-hourly off-peak services to and from Manchester, and before the electrification of the Manchester to Preston line the Blackpool North service ran to and from Buxton. Since then, the Blackpool North train has run to and from Manchester Airport instead, reducing the number of trains between Piccadilly to Hazel Grove to two off-peak trains per hour. No services ran beyond Piccadilly between May 2018 and May 2019 due to the electrification of the line through Bolton.

South of Hazel Grove, the off-peak pattern is half-hourly. The hourly Liverpool to Nottingham or to Norwich East Midlands Railway and Liverpool to Cleethorpes TransPennine Express services run over the Edgeley to Hazel Grove section, but only one East Midlands Railway service calls at Hazel Grove on weekday mornings and Sundays; all others are non-stop between Stockport and Sheffield or have one stop at Chinley.
