= Woodsmoor =

Suburb of Stockport, England

Coordinates: 53.3870°N 2.1455°W

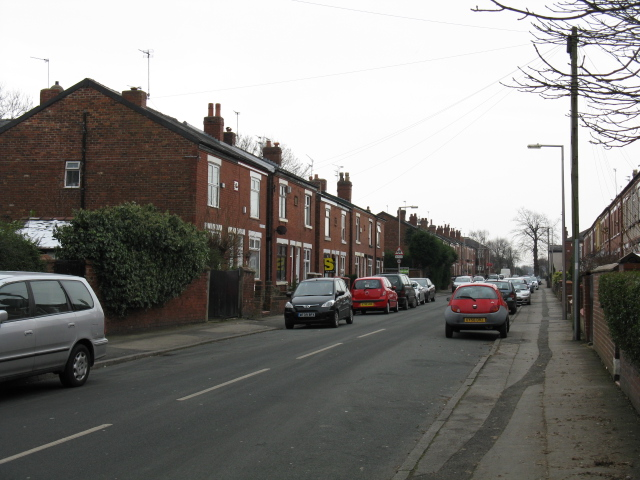
- Claremont Road, Great Moor, 2013

- Location within Greater Manchester
- Metropolitan borough: Stockport
- Metropolitan county: Greater Manchester
- Region: North West
- Country: England
- Sovereign state: United Kingdom
- Post town: STOCKPORT
- Postcode district: SK2
- Dialling code: 0161
- Police: Greater Manchester
- Fire: Greater Manchester
- Ambulance: North West
- UK Parliament: Cheadle

Woodsmoor is a suburb of Stockport in Greater Manchester, England

The area is served by Woodsmoor railway station, opened by British Rail in 1990.

The area is populated by many large and old trees, existing since the time that it was the estate of the house which eventually became Stockport Grammar School. A former golf course links Woodsmoor with Stepping Hill and Hazel Grove.

Woodsmoor is home to Stockport Georgians Cricket Club and Stockport Georgians Football Club. Their facilities are at Cromley Road.

The cricket club play in the Cheshire County Cricket League
