= Woodsmoor railway station =

Railway station in Greater Manchester, England

Coordinates: 53.3862°N 2.14155°W

Woodsmoor
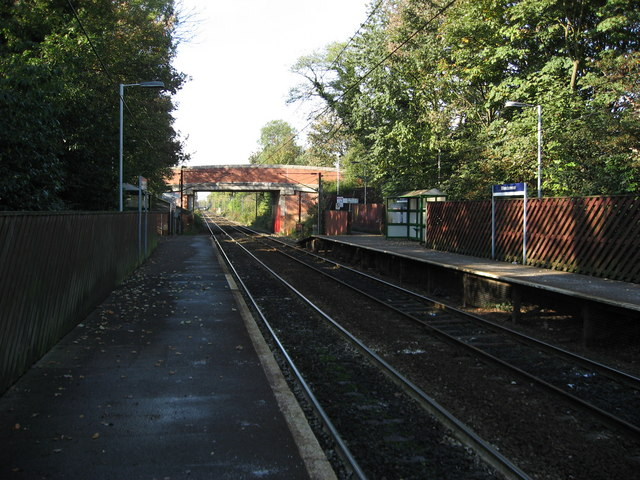

General information
- Location: Woodsmoor, Stockport; England
- Grid reference: SJ906877
- Managed by: Northern
- Transit authority: Greater Manchester
- Platforms: 2

Other information
- Station code: WSR
- Classification: DfT category E

History
- Opened: October 1990

Passengers
- 2020/21: ▼64,220
- 2021/22: ▲0.169 million
- 2022/23: ▲0.195 million
- 2023/24: ▲0.226 million
- 2024/25: ▲0.247 million
Location
Notes
- Passenger statistics from the Office of Rail and Road

Woodsmoor railway station is on the Buxton Line in Woodsmoor, a suburb of Stockport, Greater Manchester, England. It was opened by British Rail in 1990.

The station is 1/2 mile (800 m) from Stepping Hill Hospital.

== Facilities ==
The station has a staffed ticket office on platform 1, which is staffed on a limited basis (weekday a.m peak only, 07:10 – 10:10). At other times tickets can be purchased from an automated ticket machine situated by the ticket office. There are standard waiting shelters on each side, whilst train running details are provided via CIS displays, automated announcements and timetable poster boards. Level access is only available to platform 1 (towards Stockport and Manchester).

== Service ==
Two Northern trains per hour operate northbound to Manchester Piccadilly and southbound to Hazel Grove during Monday to Saturday daytime, with one train per hour continuing to Buxton. Sunday services are hourly between Manchester Piccadilly and Buxton.

Through running north of Manchester ceased temporarily as part of a major timetable change in May 2018. Through running resumed in May 2019 with an hourly service running from Hazel Grove to Blackpool North. Through running was stopped again in December 2022.

Hope Valley Line trains towards/from Chinley or Sheffield do not stop here.

Preceding station	National Rail	Following station
Hazel Grove	Northern Trains Buxton line	Davenport
