= Hazel Grove railway station =

Railway station in Greater Manchester, England

Coordinates: 53.3777°N 2.1226°W

Hazel Grove
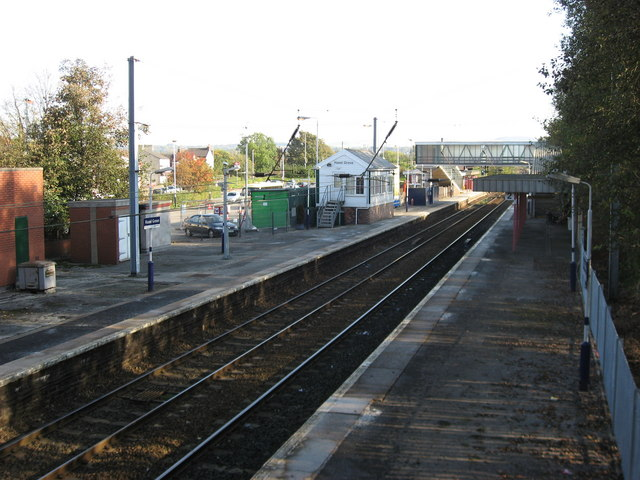
- Hazel Grove railway station

General information
- Location: Hazel Grove, Stockport; England
- Grid reference: SJ919867
- Manager: Northern Trains
- Transit authority: Transport for Greater Manchester
- Platforms: 2

Other information
- Station code: HAZ
- Classification: DfT category D

History
- Opened: 1857

Passengers
- 2020/21: ▼0.107 million
- Interchange: ▼886
- 2021/22: ▲0.360 million
- Interchange: ▲2,468
- 2022/23: ▲0.405 million
- Interchange: ▼380
- 2023/24: ▲0.441 million
- Interchange: ▲527
- 2024/25: ▲0.519 million
- Interchange: ▲568
Location
Notes
- Passenger statistics from the Office of Rail and Road

Hazel Grove railway station serves the village of Hazel Grove in Greater Manchester, England. It is a junction station, serving both the Buxton line (from Stockport to Buxton) and the Hope Valley line (from Stockport to Sheffield). The station is managed by Northern Trains, which operates all trains that stop here.

== History ==
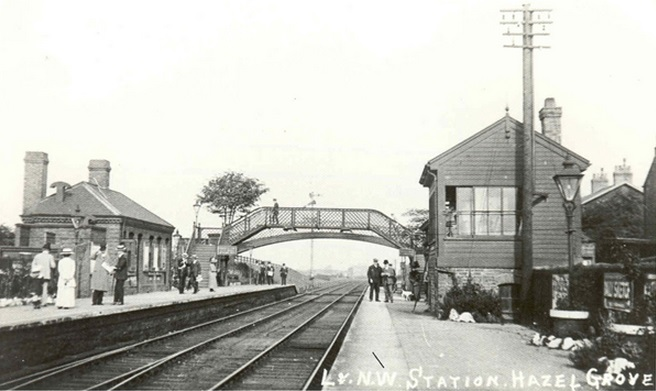
The station in the 1900s

The station was built for the Stockport, Disley and Whaley Bridge Railway, by the London and North Western Railway, and opened on 9 June 1857. From 1923 until 1948, it was owned by the London Midland and Scottish Railway and, following nationalisation, it was operated by the London Midland Region of British Railways.

There was once another station in the village, Hazel Grove (Midland) on the Midland Railway's line from New Mills South Junction to Manchester Central, via Cheadle Heath; this opened in 1902, but it was less conveniently situated and closed in 1917.

The Stockport, Disley and Whaley Bridge Railway was extremely expensive to build, with extensive earthworks required. The navvies were accommodated in specially-built houses near the Rising Sun pub, which still exist and are known as the Navvy Mansions. The line from Edgeley Junction, just south of Stockport, to Hazel Grove was electrified in 1981 on the 25 kV AC overhead system. This allowed electric trains to operate on the route from Altrincham, via Sale to serve the station until that line was closed for conversion to Manchester Metrolink operation in late 1991; electric services to and from Piccadilly continued thereafter.

The signal box on the Buxton-bound platform remains in use. This controls the junction between the Buxton line and the chord linking it to the Hope Valley line, through Disley Tunnel and towards Sheffield; it also controls a pair of carriage sidings at the Stockport end used for stabling trains that terminate here.

The Hazel Grove Chord opened in 1986. This allowed trains to/from Stockport and Manchester Piccadilly to access the former Manchester Central – New Mills South Junction line, just south of Hazel Grove station. It provides a faster route between Manchester and Sheffield than the former route via Romiley and New Mills Central. The chord also enables Sheffield trains to serve Stockport and run to/from Liverpool Lime Street.

== Facilities ==
The station is staffed all week, with its ticket office on platform 1 open 06:05-19:00 weekdays (until 20:00 on Fridays only), 07:00-20:00 Saturdays and 09:00-16:30 Sundays. There are waiting rooms on both platforms, toilets in the main building and a small coffee shop on platform 2.

Train running details are provided via automated announcements, timetable posters and digital information screens. Step-free access is available to both platforms via the lifts built into the footbridge linking the platforms.

== Services ==
As of December 2022, the station is served on weekdays by two trains per hour northbound to Manchester Piccadilly and one train per hour southbound to Buxton, with one southbound train terminating here. The service terminating here does not run on Sundays. The station is also served by one train per day on the Hope Valley Line to Sheffield.

Many regular services operated by East Midlands Railway and TransPennine Express pass through the station but do not stop.

The station is served by a mix of EMUs and DMUs, as this station is electrified to Manchester, but the lines beyond it are not.

Preceding station	National Rail	Following station
Chinley	Northern Trains Hope Valley Line Limited service	Stockport
Middlewood	Northern Trains Buxton line	Woodsmoor
Terminus	Northern Trains Buxton line	Woodsmoor
