= Combs, Derbyshire =

Village in Derbyshire, England

Coordinates: 53.3051°N 1.937°W

Combs
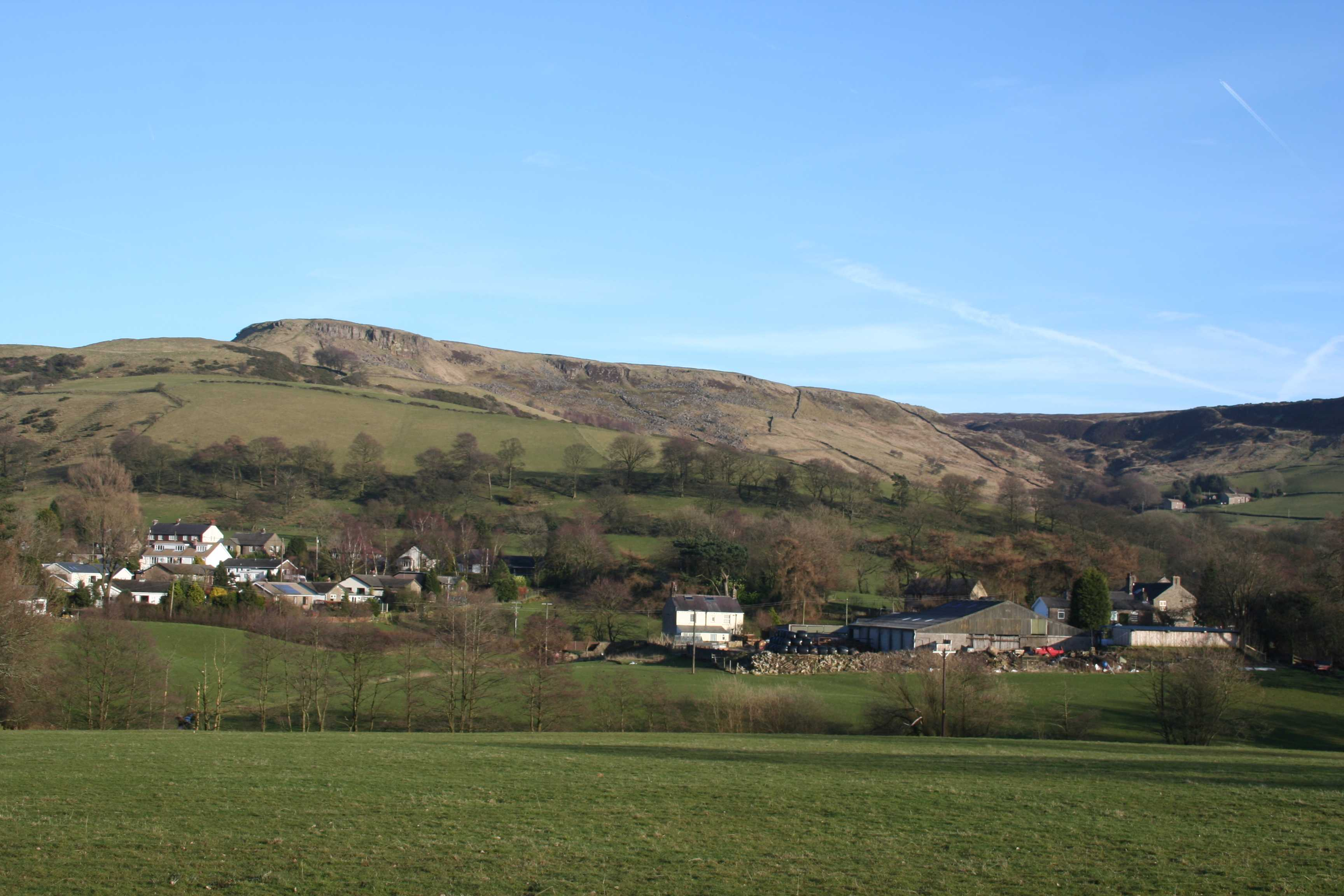
- Combs from the west, with Castle Naze hillfort and the plateau of Combs Moss in the background

- Location within Derbyshire
- Population: 246 (Parish, 2011)
- OS grid reference: SK042786
- Civil parish: Chapel-en-le-Frith
- District: High Peak
- Shire county: Derbyshire
- Region: East Midlands
- Country: England
- Sovereign state: United Kingdom
- Post town: HIGH PEAK
- Postcode district: SK23
- Dialling code: 01298
- Police: Derbyshire
- Fire: Derbyshire
- Ambulance: East Midlands
- UK Parliament: High Peak

Combs is a small village in Derbyshire, England, in the civil parish of Chapel-en-le-Frith and the Peak District National Park.

The village is bounded to the east, west and south by gritstone edges and moorland, the highest of which is Black Edge (507 m (1,663 ft)). To the north the embankment of the Buxton to Stockport railway separates it from Combs Reservoir. To the east is Castle Naze, a prehistoric settlement site.

The village has a pub, the Beehive Inn, and infant school.

Combs resident Herbert Frood developed a vehicle brake pad and in 1897 founded the company Ferodo. The village was also home to journalists and authors Crichton Porteous and Peggy Bellhouse.

Old Brook House and its barn, close to the Beehive public house, is a listed building. Parts of it date from the 17th and 18th centuries, as does Marsh Hall closer to Chapel-en-le-frith.
