= Whaley Bridge railway station =

Railway station in Derbyshire, England

Whaley Bridge

General information
- Location: Whaley Bridge, High Peak; England
- Coordinates: 53.33°N 1.985°W
- Grid reference: SK011815
- Manager: Northern Trains
- Platforms: 2

Other information
- Station code: WBR
- Classification: DfT category E

History
- Original company: Stockport, Disley and Whaley Bridge Railway
- Pre-grouping: London and North Western Railway
- Post-grouping: London, Midland and Scottish Railway

Key dates
- 9 June 1857: Station opened

Passengers
- 2020/21: ▼29,810
- 2021/22: ▲96,090
- 2022/23: ▲0.106 million
- 2023/24: ▲0.120 million
- 2024/25: ▲0.134 million
Location
Notes
- Passenger statistics from the Office of Rail and Road

Whaley Bridge railway station serves the Peak District town of Whaley Bridge, in Derbyshire, England. It is a stop on the Buxton Line, 16 1/4 miles (26.2 km) south-east of Manchester Piccadilly.

== History ==
Opened on 9 June 1857, the station was originally on the Stockport, Disley and Whaley Bridge Railway; it was built by the London and North Western Railway to connect with the Cromford and High Peak Railway and was extended to Buxton in 1863.

Until 1983, the station had an active signal box and served as a terminus for some trains to/from Manchester Piccadilly.

== Facilities ==
The ticket office is staffed six days per week (Mondays to Saturdays) from early morning until early afternoon (06:50-13:25); at other times, tickets must be purchased prior to travel or on the train. There is a waiting room in the main building, open when the booking office is staffed, and canopies to offer a covered waiting area at all times; platform two has a waiting shelter. Train running information is provided via help points on each platform, digital CIS displays, timetable posters and automated announcements.

The station is unusual for the line in that its platform one, where the main station building and ticket office is sited, is on the side for trains bound for Buxton, whereas platform two serves trains to Manchester. The platform is on a tight curve and was some 30 cm too low for the height of the carriages used, making it difficult to access for people with mobility problems. It was addressed by Network Rail in 2012, which rebuilt the Buxton platform and installed a Harrington Hump easy access ramp on the Manchester-bound side.

The station enjoys the support of the local community in the form of the Friends of Whaley Bridge Station, a voluntary group dedicated to improving and maintaining the station buildings and grounds.

== Service ==
Northern Trains operates a generally hourly service in each direction between Manchester Piccadilly, Stockport and Buxton. There are some additional services at peak times.

Preceding station	National Rail	Following station
Chapel-en-le-Frith	Northern Trains Buxton line	Furness Vale
	Disused railways	
Terminus	London and North Western Railway; Cromford and High Peak Railway	Shallcross
