= Stockport, Disley and Whaley Bridge Railway =

Railway company in England

Overview
- Locale: Stockport Edgeley; Davenport (1858); Hazel Grove; Middlewood (1879); New Mills Newtown; Furness Vale; Whaley Bridge
- Dates of operation: 1853–1866
- Successor: London and North Western Railway

Technical
- Track gauge: 4 ft 8 1/2 in (1,435 mm) standard gauge

The Stockport, Disley and Whaley Bridge Railway was an early railway company in England which was opened in 1857 between Stockport Edgeley and Whaley Bridge.

== Origins ==
As early as 1828 when the Cromford and High Peak Railway and the Liverpool and Manchester Railway were still under construction, a Mr Thomas Legh had proposed in Stockport, that they could well be connected by a railway line from the former's terminus at Whaley Bridge. There were also number of other ideas for lines from London to meet the C&HPR at Cromford to reach Manchester. The main problem had been that of carrying passengers on the series of cable operated sections (see Derby station)

In the next few years the route of the line was hotly contested by the three major railways of the time. The Manchester, Sheffield and Lincolnshire Railway had gained approval in 1848 for an extension of the Whaley Bridge branch of the Peak Forest Canal, which it owned, from Bugsworth to the tramway, with the eventual aim of reaching Buxton. This was succeeded by plans for a railway line, but neither scheme had been proceeded with due to lack of funds.

The Midland Railway and the Manchester and Birmingham Railway had jointly leased the impecunious Manchester, Buxton, Matlock and Midlands Junction Railway which had reached Rowsley by 1849, with the view of running through Buxton and up the Goyt Valley to Whaley Bridge and thence to a junction with the M&B at Cheadle Hulme. However, when the M&B merged into the new LNWR the latter naturally sought to restrict competition with its own London to Manchester service.

== Construction ==
Stockport, Disley, and Whaley Bridge Railway Act 1854
- Act of Parliament
- Parliament of the United Kingdom
- Long title: An Act for making a Railway from the London and North-western Railway near Stockport to Disley and Whaley Bridge, all in the County of Chester; and for other Purposes.
- Citation: 17 & 18 Vict. c. cc

Dates
- Royal assent: 31 July 1854

Text of statute as originally enacted

Stockport, Disley, and Whaley Bridge Railway Act 1855
- Act of Parliament
- Parliament of the United Kingdom
- Long title: An Act to enable the Stockport, Disley, and Whaley Bridge Railway Company to construct a Junction Line to the Cromford and High Peak Railway, and for other Purposes.
- Citation: 18 & 19 Vict. c. cxxx

Dates
- Royal assent: 16 July 1855

Text of statute as originally enacted

In 1853 Thomas Legh, together with other landowners and financiers from London, formed the committee of the Stockport, Disley, and Whaley Bridge Railway, with its first meeting at the Swann Inn Disley. The engineers would be Joseph Locke and J. E. Errington. When the bill was put before Parliament there was opposition from both the MS&LR and the LNWR, however the Stockport, Disley, and Whaley Bridge Railway Act 1854 (17 & 18 Vict. c. cc) was passed on 31 July 1854. The line would be operated on the company's behalf by the LNWR. A further act of Parliament, the Stockport, Disley and Whaley Bridge Railway Act 1855 (18 & 19 Vict. c. cxxx), allowed for a short line from Whaley Bridge to the end of the Cromford and High Peak.

Construction of the line produced very few problems, the main one being an embankment between Hazel Grove and Norbury. The line was opened on 28 May 1857 and a special train left Stockport for Whaley Bridge where on the return a celebratory dinner was held in the schoolroom at Disley. That evening a supper was provided for the workmen.

The actual first service was on 9 June, the intermediate stations being Hazel Grove, Disley, New Town (south of New Mills) and Furness Vale. Coaching connections were provided to Buxton and Chapel-en-le-Frith.

A viaduct to connect the line with the Cromford and High Peak was not complete when traffic began in August 1857. The carrier had to transfer the limestone using his own horses and carts. The wagons carrying the limestone were added to the passenger trains, and it was reported that three wagonloads were despatched with each. The viaduct was completed towards the end of the year.

In 1855 there a meeting of the three companies at Euston Square, where it was noted that the S&WB line was virtually complete. The possibility of extending it to Buxton or Rowsley was discussed. Both the MS&LR and the Midland proposed that no one of the three companies should proceed alone with any scheme, but the meeting ended with them more than a little suspicious of the LNWR.

The SD&WBR's capital was £150,000, of which £85,000 came from the LNWR and £3,750 from the C&HPR. Although, the public message was that the line was independently financed, James Allport of the Midland Railway felt justified in saying it was an LNWR undertaking – moreover deliberately designed to prevent other railways from entering the area.

== The Buxton extension ==
Stockport, Disley, and Whaley Bridge Railway Extension Act 1857
- Act of Parliament
- Parliament of the United Kingdom
- Long title: An Act to empower the Stockport, Disley, and Whaley Bridge Railway Company to extend their Railway to Buxton, and for other Purposes connected with their Undertaking.
- Citation: 20 & 21 Vict. c. xcviii

Dates
- Royal assent: 27 July 1857

Text of statute as originally enacted

At the end of 1856, the Midland approached the LNWR with a proposal to extend the jointly leased MBM&MJR as a through route. They offered to subscribe £200,000 and the Duke of Devonshire was willing to add £50,000, even allowing the line to pass through Chatsworth Park if necessary. The LNWR turned down the offer and, in fact, were quietly pursuing plans for an extension of the SD&WB. When the bill went before Parliament the Midland Railway raised no opposition. They had been refused a hearing about the original railway on the ground that they had no locus standi. The Stockport, Disley, and Whaley Bridge Railway Extension Act 1857 (20 & 21 Vict. c. xcviii) was passed on 27 July 1857. Fox suggests this was facilitated by the Duke of Devonshire and discussions with the MSL and Midland Railways. While these may have been amicable at first they were not the destined to stay that way. Additional capital of £200,000 was to be raised for the extension and, once again, the LNWR contributed the lion's share – £105,000 with the MS&LR providing up to £35,000. Formal transfer to the LNWR took place on 16 November 1866 having been authorised by the London and North-western Railway (New Works and Additional Powers) Act 1866 (29 & 30 Vict. c. ccxlix).

Moreover, while the Midland's original plan had been to cross from Buxton to the Goyt Valley then north to Whaley Bridge, the LNWR took a roundabout route through Chapel-en-le-Frith thence by an immense curve to Dove Holes before travelling south to Buxton. It certainly didn't suit the expresses that the Midland intended to run.

The Midland Railway felt that, simply for political reasons, the LNWR had built an inferior line. As Allport put it:

"The proposed railway, for some reason which does not appear on the face of it is run along the high country where there is little or no population; and instead of taking the valley with a gradually rising ascent, it goes up the steep gradient out of Buxton, to fall down again. The line appears to me to have gone up the hill for the sake of going down again."

Work began in 1859 and progressed fairly smoothly. There were problems at Combs where there was to be a road underbridge. In the end, it proved necessary to divert the road to a point where the embankment was shallower. There was one tunnel planned – Eaves Tunnel. It had been expected to be 300 yards, but finished as 431 yards long. On the same stretch over the Barmoor, north of Dove Holes, a planned 87 feet deep cutting, became Barmoor Clough Tunnel of 111 yards. The company was now openly under the control of the LNWR with its secretary, C. E. Stewart, also the secretary of the SD&WBR.

The line was open to Buxton on 30 May 1863. On the same day as the Midland line from Rowsley, although full passenger services did not begin until 15 June.
