= Buxton railway station =

Railway station in Derbyshire, England

Buxton
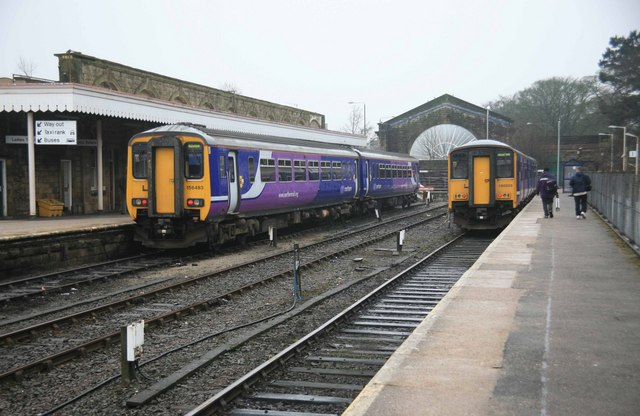
- A Class 156 and a Class 150/2 unit at Buxton station in March 2010

General information
- Location: Buxton, High Peak; England
- Coordinates: 53.261°N 1.913°W
- Grid reference: SK059737
- Manager: Northern Trains
- Platforms: 2

Other information
- Station code: BUX
- Classification: DfT category E

History
- Original company: Stockport, Disley and Whaley Bridge Railway
- Pre-grouping: London and North Western Railway
- Post-grouping: London, Midland and Scottish Railway

Key dates
- 15 June 1863: Station opened

Passengers
- 2020/21: ▼98,236
- 2021/22: ▲0.272 million
- 2022/23: ▲0.302 million
- 2023/24: ▲0.349 million
- 2024/25: ▲0.382 million
Location
Notes
- Passenger statistics from the Office of Rail and Road

Buxton railway station serves the Peak District town of Buxton in Derbyshire, England. It is managed and served by Northern Trains. The station is 25 3/4 miles (41.4 km) south-east of Manchester Piccadilly and is the terminus of the Buxton line.

== History ==
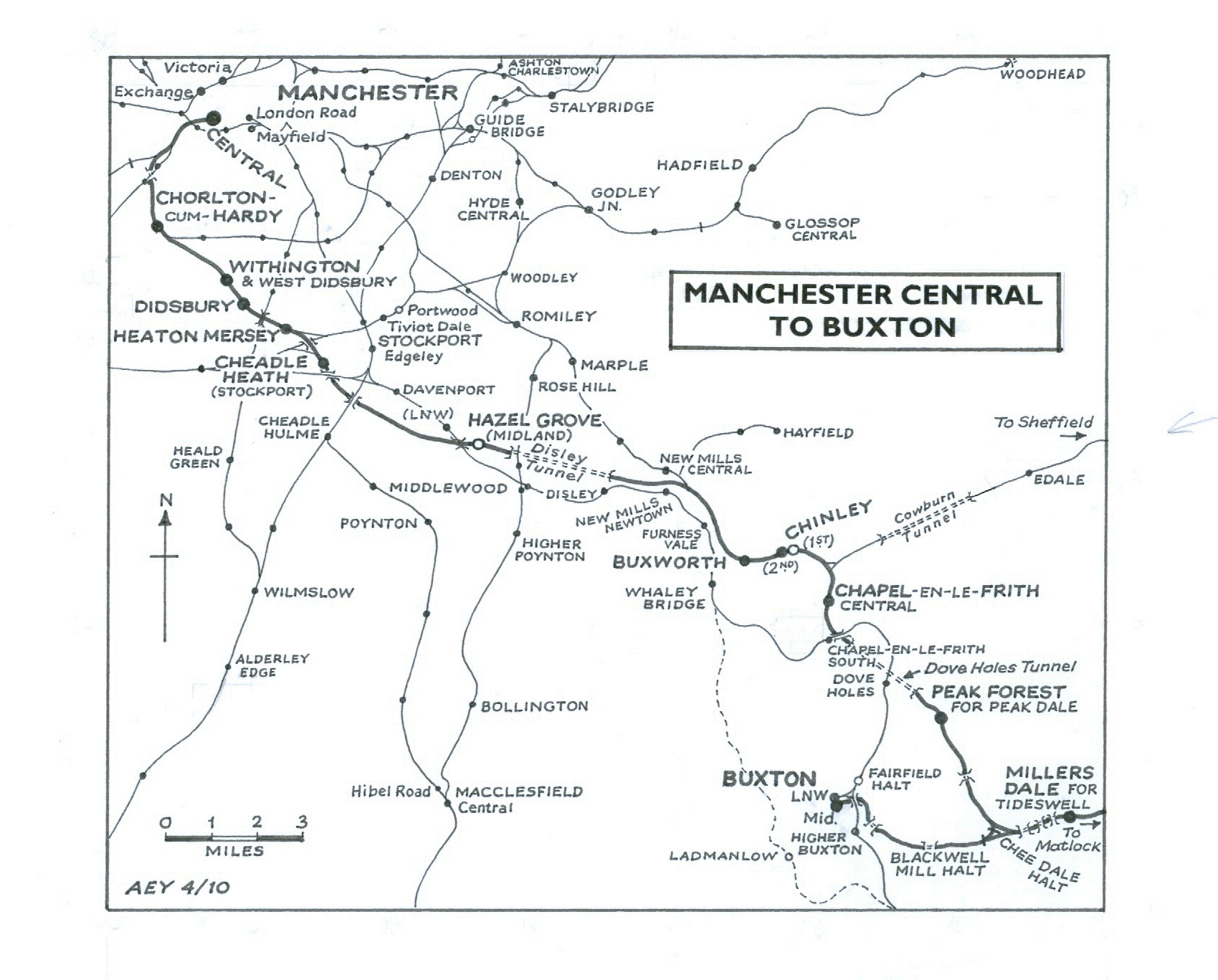
Map showing the former extent of railways around Buxton

Two railways arrived in Buxton almost simultaneously in 1863. The Stockport, Disley and Whaley Bridge Railway, heavily promoted by the London and North Western Railway (LNWR), built its line from Manchester to Whaley Bridge and extended it to Buxton. Meanwhile, the Midland Railway extended the Manchester, Buxton, Matlock and Midlands Junction Railway from Rowsley. When the Midland extended its main line to New Mills in 1867, to bypass the LNWR, Buxton became a branch line from Millers Dale. The two railways planned separate stations, but the town's leaders were concerned that the railway would damage the character of the place and requested that they be built side by side and be in-keeping with the existing architecture of the town. Consequently, the LNWR and Midland station were given identical frontages designed by Joseph Paxton, each being built from local stone and having a wrought iron glazed train shed roof, fronted with identical half-circle fan windows.

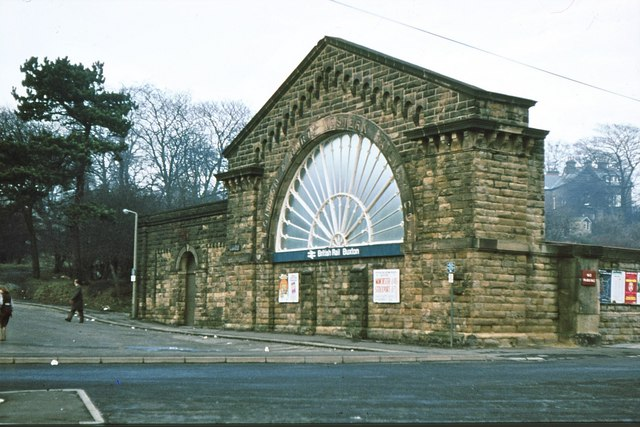
The fan window, seen here in 1979

The Midland station closed in 1967, along with the line to Rowsley, and the site is now a roadway. However, the line through Dove Holes Tunnel from Chinley is still used for freight, such as limestone from Tunstead, along with the old Midland branch into Buxton and part of the old Ashbourne Line (closed to passengers in October 1954), which remains in use to serve a lime works at Dowlow and the quarry at Hindlow. These both join the main line just outside the station, where there also a number of sidings to allow trains to reverse. The bay platform formerly used by Ashbourne line trains and the connecting curve from it towards Dowlow have been removed, though it is still possible to trace its route. The LNWR station now handles local trains into Manchester, using its line through Dove Holes and Chapel-en-le-Frith.

The trainshed roof of the remaining station was removed, leaving only the fan window and its stonework at the end of the station as a remnant. The wall and window were Grade II listed in 1970. In 2009 the fan window was restored.

=== Accidents ===
- A runaway limestone train demolished the boiler room and gents' toilet and damaged the porters' room in 1897, killing a passenger and injuring a porter.
- A LNWR Class B boiler blew up in the station yard on 11 November 1921, killing the driver and fireman.

== Facilities ==
The station is fully staffed, with a self-service ticket machine also available for use outside the ticket office opening times and for collecting pre-paid tickets. A payphone, waiting room and toilets are all provided in the main building, whilst platform 1 has a waiting shelter and bench seating. Step-free access is available to both platforms from the main entrance. In November 2022, Buxton became the first station in Derbyshire to install dementia-friendly signage.

== Services ==
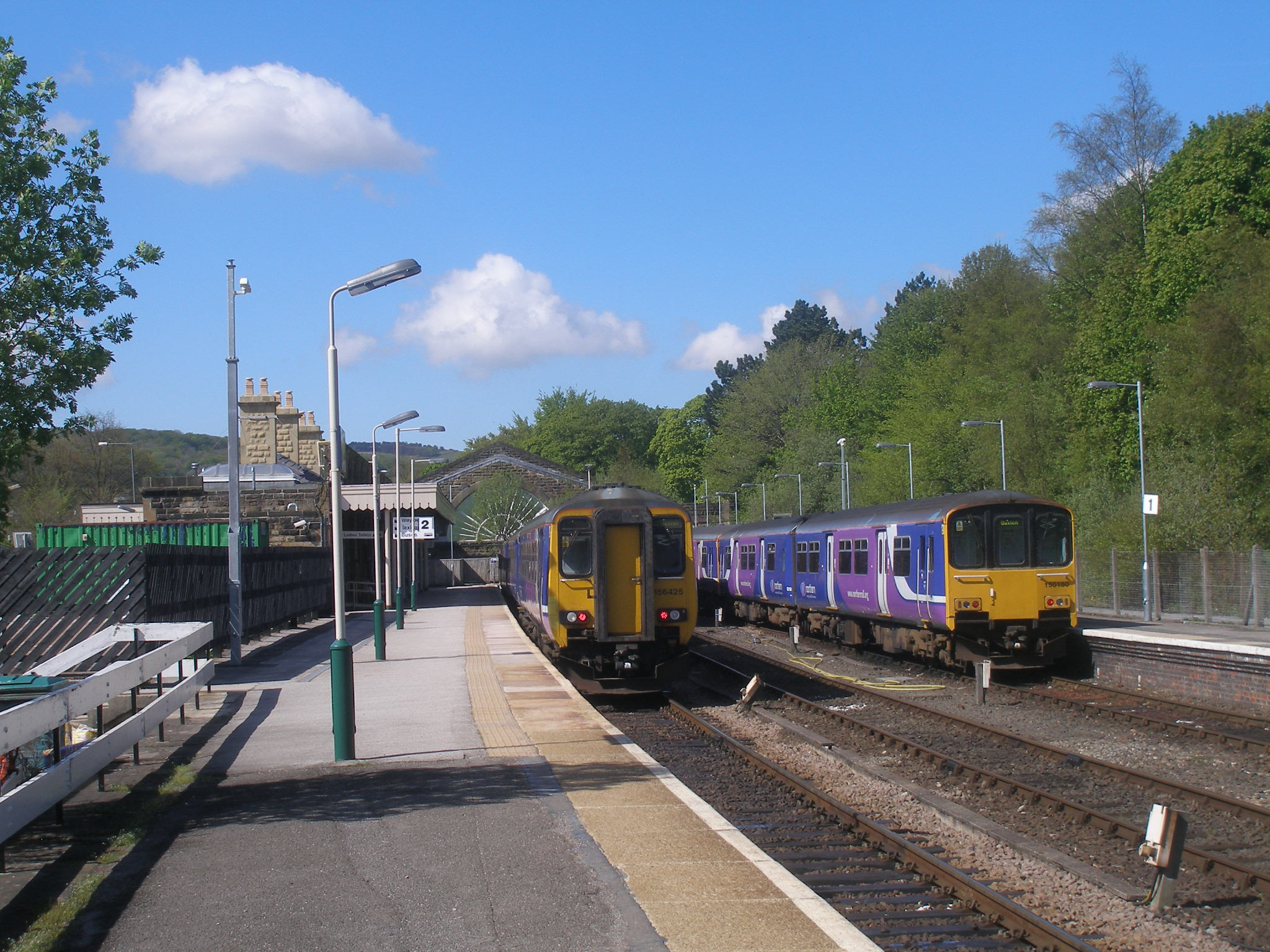
Two Northern services awaiting their respective departures towards Manchester

Until May 2018, there was an hourly service daily (including Sundays) between Buxton and Manchester Piccadilly, taking about one hour. The service frequency was enhanced to about half-hourly in the morning and evening peaks. A limited number of trains worked through beyond Manchester, with trains to/from Blackpool North, Clitheroe, Barrow-in-Furness, Wigan North Western, Preston and Kirkby.

From 21 May 2018, two trains per hour started running between Manchester and Buxton all day, one of which omits certain stations en route. The evening and Sunday service remains hourly and there are no longer any through trains north of Manchester.

The service is currently (2023) hourly during the day and evening, with additional trains in the morning and evening peaks.

Platform 2 is the main platform for arrivals and departures. Platform 1 is a departure platform by shunt move, which is usually used in early mornings by the first trains of the day.

| Preceding station | National Rail | Following station |
|---|---|---|
| Terminus | Northern Buxton line | Dove Holes |
| | Disused railways | |
| Terminus | LNWR; Ashbourne line | Higher Buxton |
| Terminus | Cromford and High Peak Railway | Ladmanlow |

== Community rail ==
The Friends of Buxton Station group won the Queens Award for Voluntary Service in 2021, for its promotion of tourism for the station. The group was originally set up in 2010.

== See also ==
- Listed buildings in Buxton

== Bibliography ==
- Radford, B. (1988). Midland Though The Peak. Unicorn Books. ISBN 9781852410018.
- Pevsner, Nikolaus (1978) [1953]. Derbyshire. The Buildings of England. Revised by Elizabeth Williamson. Yale University Press. p. 116. ISBN 0-14-071008-6.
