= Northwood and Tinkersley =

Civil parish in Derbyshire, England

Coordinates: 53.180°N 1.602°W

- Civil parish
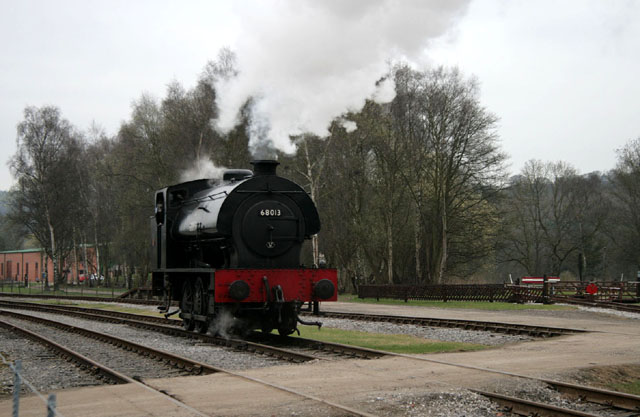
- Peak Rail engine at Rowsley South station

- Location within Derbyshire
- Interactive map of Northwood and Tinkersley
- Area: 0.87 sq mi (2.3 km^{2})
- Population: 650 (2021)
  - Density: 747/sq mi (288/km^{2})
- Created: 1980
- OS grid reference: SK 265648
  - London: 125 mi (201 km)
- District: Derbyshire Dales
- Shire county: Derbyshire
- Region: East Midlands
- Country: England
- Sovereign state: United Kingdom
- Post town: MATLOCK
- Postcode district: DE4
- Dialling code: 01629
- Police: Derbyshire
- Fire: Derbyshire
- Ambulance: East Midlands
- UK Parliament: Derbyshire Dales
- Website: northwoodtinkersleypc.com

Northwood and Tinkersley is a civil parish within the Derbyshire Dales district, in the county of Derbyshire, England. Named for its main settlements, with a mix of rural and built up areas, it had a population of 650 residents in the 2021 census. The parish is 125 miles (201 km) north west of London, 18 miles (29 km) north west of the county city of Derby, and 3 1/2 miles (5.6 km) north west of the nearest market town of Matlock. Northwood and Tinkersley is directly adjacent to the Peak District national park to the west, and shares a border with the parishes of Darley Dale, Rowsley and Stanton.

== Geography ==
=== Location ===
Northwood and Tinkersley is surrounded by the following local places:

- Rowsley to the north
- Darley Dale and Darley Hillside to the south
- Congreave, Pilhough and Stanton-in-Peak to the west.
- Sydnope is a historic area to the east.

It is 0.87 square miles (2.3 km^{2}; 230 ha) in area, 1.5 miles (2.4 km) in height and 1.1 miles (1.8 km) in width.

The parish is roughly bounded by land features such as Chesterfield Road and Copy Wood to the north, the River Derwent is to the west, Fallinge Edge is to the east and Rowley South heritage railway station lies to the south. This area lies in the north east of the Derbyshire Dales district and central portion of Derbyshire county.

Northwood and Tinkersley is adjacent to the Peak District National Park, the parish resting alongside its south eastern edge.

==== Settlements and routes ====
There are two built-up locations within the parish:

- Northwood is the larger village, and is to the central south of the area, spanning from the western valley to the eastern hill side of the parish, made up of mainly residential housing;
- Tinkersley is a self contained hamlet at the end of an unnamed no-through road in the north, 1/3 mile (0.54 km) to the north of Northwood, with a small number of farms and repurposed agricultural buildings.

Outside of these settlements, the parish is predominantly an agricultural and rural area, with some industrial locations.

The key route through the parish is the A6 road from Matlock through to Bakewell. It is a historic cross-country way, running north to south in the west part of the area.

=== Environment ===
==== Landscape ====
Primarily farming and pasture land throughout the parish outside the populated areas, there is some forestry throughout, mainly Copy Wood in the north above Tinkersley, Northwood Carr separating Northwood and Tinkersley, and a strip to the north of the industrial park alongside the River Derwent, which is the now-dismantled railway route towards Bakewell. The north eastern corner of the parish is uncultivated moorland, and part of the wider Fallinge Edge, it is also known as Little Bumper Piece.

==== Geology ====
Being alongside the Peak District National Park, the composition of the parish is broadly similar, with limestone, and gritstone featuring in the geology of the wider area. It lies on millstone grit from the carboniferous era, rising through mudstones, Bowland shales, Ashover grit sandstones and siltstone, making up the Marsden Formation which have formed soils that are mainly alluvium comprising clay, silt, sand and gravel, particularly along the banks of the Derwent.

==== Water features ====
The River Derwent forms all the western boundary of the parish. Unnamed minor tributaries flow through Northwood Carr and Copy Wood.

==== Land elevation ====
The parish rises from the River Derwent towards the east, the lowest point is around the southern river valley at ~95 metres (312 ft), Tinkersley is in the range of 150–175 metres (492–574 ft), the area around Northwood village ranges from 100 metres (330 ft) by the A6 road to 225 metres (738 ft), with the parish peak in the moorland by Fallinge Edge at 320 metres (1,050 ft).

== History ==
=== Toponymy ===
Northwood was 'Northwod' in the 14th century, and was a simple compound form of 'north wood', while Tinkersley stands for 'tinker's lea (meadow)'.

=== Local area ===
A small cairn is recorded within Fallinge Edge, dating human occupation in the parish to the Bronze Age between 2350 BC to 701 BC. Neither Northwood or Tinkersley were recorded as standalone settlements at the time of Domesday in 1086 AD, these areas then being a part of the extensive ancient parish of Darley, which along with surrounding locations, were all lands owned by William the Conqueror. Darley was divided into several manors, Old Hall and Nether Hall amongst others, with Stanclffe Hall and surrounding areas affiliated to Old Hall. These lands after the Norman Conquest while initially owned by the monarch, the manors passed to several owners through moiety.

Northwood was first noted in public record at the start of the 14th century, while Tinkersley was recorded from 1664. At the time of the Black Death in the 14th century, several local areas in Darley became depopulated, nearby Burley and Churchtown residents were dispersed by the upheaval and some relocated to Northwood, forming the new village around a cluster of older houses at the triangle, near the top of Northwood Road which was the original settlement. During much of the 1700s, the Greensmiths were Lords of the Manor. In 1791 Herbert Greensmith, a lead merchant from Wirksworth then living at Stancliffe Hall, realigned Whitworth Road to go around the eastern edge of his park and on to Northwood, removing two farm houses and their buildings to create the new route.

In 1392 William Roper passed to Nicholas Attewelle the Rector of Darley, ownership of the manor, possibly as a trustee. As later ownership became fragmented, vicar and rector William Wray from 1766 began a programme of consolidating the then scattered glebes by trading plots with other landowners, which by this time included Tinkersley. His successor Benjamin Lawrence, finally passed on Tinkersley in the manor of Little Rowsley when it was enclosed in 1817. Old Hall and Little Rowsley manors by the 18th century were mainly already held by the Duke of Rutland. Most of the area surrounding Bakewell, including the land around Darley was sold by his estate in 1920.

A key Derby to Manchester route in the 18th century, passed over Matlock Bridge, traversed the upper edge of the hillside through Darley Dale and Two Dales, and then passed through Northwood, south of Tinkersley, and Rowsley Bar before reaching Rowsley. A new main road alignment (which became the A6 road) was built alongside the river with the help of Herbert Greensmith-Beard from Stancliffe who arranged to reuse what were then private routes on their western boundary. In 1823 the new owner Arthur Heathcote-Heathcote helped to extend it to Rowsley once the land had been drained, however it flooded regularly until the Derwent was dammed near its source in the early 20th century.

Because the area was part of the wider Darley parish, there were no Church of England sites, but there were a traditional Methodist building as well as a Wesleyan Reform Church to the west of Northwood along today's A6 road, and a primitive church along Lumb Lane. The Derwent Valley Aqueduct from the Derwent dams in the Upper Derwent Valley was built through the area in the beginning of the 20th century, skirting to the east of Tinkersley and Northwood villages, and flowing to a reservoir in Ambergate. An observatory was recorded in the Lumb Lane vicinity by the middle 20th century, but was later closed.

In 1894 the North Darley Urban District was formed for local administration of public affairs out of the ancient Darley parish, but encompassing only the area above the Derwent. This was abolished in 1934 and the area subsumed into Matlock urban district which stretched from Rowsley through to Bonsall and Tansley. Derbyshire Dales district was formed in 1974 with the merger of Matlock along with many other local districts. On the 1st of April 1980, the Northwood and Tinkersley parish was formally created from part of the former urban district of Matlock.

=== Railway and depot ===
The stretch of the Manchester, Buxton, Matlock and Midlands Junction Railway line from Ambergate to Rowsley railway station opened in 1849, running to the west of Northwood and Tinkersley villages and A6 road. The parish never contained a station on this branch line, as the villages were then minor settlement areas, stations instead being opened in Darley Dale and Rowsley villages. A depot was built at the Rowsley terminus to stable locomotives. The line was extended to Buxton in 1862-3 and a new Rowsley station built along a new alignment to the south.

Over the next decade, the use of the depot facilities expanded to provide additional engines for goods trains and general assistance over the higher geography towards Buxton, along with means to be able to sort and divide trains. With these proving inadequate because of the ever increasing traffic, and the resulting congestion, the Midland Railway obtained additional land in the early 1870s to the south, adjacent to Tinkersley, and built a substantial sidings area, which opened in 1877.

Although further land had been compulsorily purchased to the south of the sidings area at the turn of the 20th century to allow further expansion, it took another couple of decades to start building works, with a second sidings and shed opening in 1926. Both sidings were in continuous usage until the Beeching cuts which mothballed the Matlock to Buxton section of the line, with complete closure by 1968. The railway between Matlock and Daley Dale was relaid by the Peak Rail heritage railway group in 1991, and by 1997 had extended the route to a new station adjacent to the former south sidings, which was initially named Northwood, but eventually renamed Rowsley South.

The cafe at the station however is still named after Northwood village, while other features of interest included the Derbyshire Dales Narrow Gauge Railway. The very north of the sidings were left to return to nature, except for a long-distance path reusing the trackbed to Rowsley village. Below this was created an area, with recycling and council depot facilities, along with some private industrial businesses. The location to the east of the southern sidings was given to the war effort in the early 1940s, with a factory built to manufacture metal components for industry, in use to the present day.

== Governance and demography ==
=== Population ===
There are 650 residents recorded within Northwood and Tinkersley civil parish for the 2021 census, a reduction (-2.3%) from 665 recorded within the 2011 census.

=== Local bodies ===
Northwood and Tinkersley is managed at the first level of public administration through a parish council.

At district level, the wider area is overseen by Derbyshire Dales district council. Derbyshire County Council provides the highest level strategic services locally.

== Economy ==
The main industrial areas in the parish are located around the A6 road corridor and the Derwent river on the fringes of Northwood village, with these employment areas including:

- Forged Solutions Group took over the Firth Rixson business in 2019, this takes up a sizeable area, with them specialising in die forgings of nickel–based superalloys, titanium alloys as well as high and low alloy steels, supplying the aerospace, power generation and civilian nuclear industries.

As well as other engineering and manufacturing facilities, business sectors within the parish include:

- haulage
- a district council depot
- waste and recycling processing centre
- a heritage railway for conservation of historic locomotives and infrastructure
- smaller varied retail premises

== Community ==
=== Amenities and facilities ===
Northwood has a small recreation area on the south side of the village.

There are various retail facilities, primarily along the A6 road.

A number of residences and farms provide holiday accommodation and bed & breakfast facilities, catering to many Peak District visitors.

== Landmarks and leisure ==
=== Conservation ===
The Eastern Peak District Moors is an extensive Site of Special Scientific Interest, the southernmost area covers the portion of Fallinge Edge that is within the parish.

=== Paths ===
The Derwent Valley Heritage Way long-distance walking route parallels the River Derwent through the western edge of the parish.

== Transport ==
Peak Rail is a heritage railway society based at the Rowley South station. The location reuses the former Rowley sidings and coal marshalling yard of the Manchester, Buxton, Matlock and Midlands Junction Railway and eventual British Rail company which was closed in 1968, and reopened in 1997 for heritage purposes. Several railway preservation groups are based at the railway, under the overall governance and premises ownership of Peak Rail.
