= Derwent Valley Heritage Way =

Long distance footpath in England

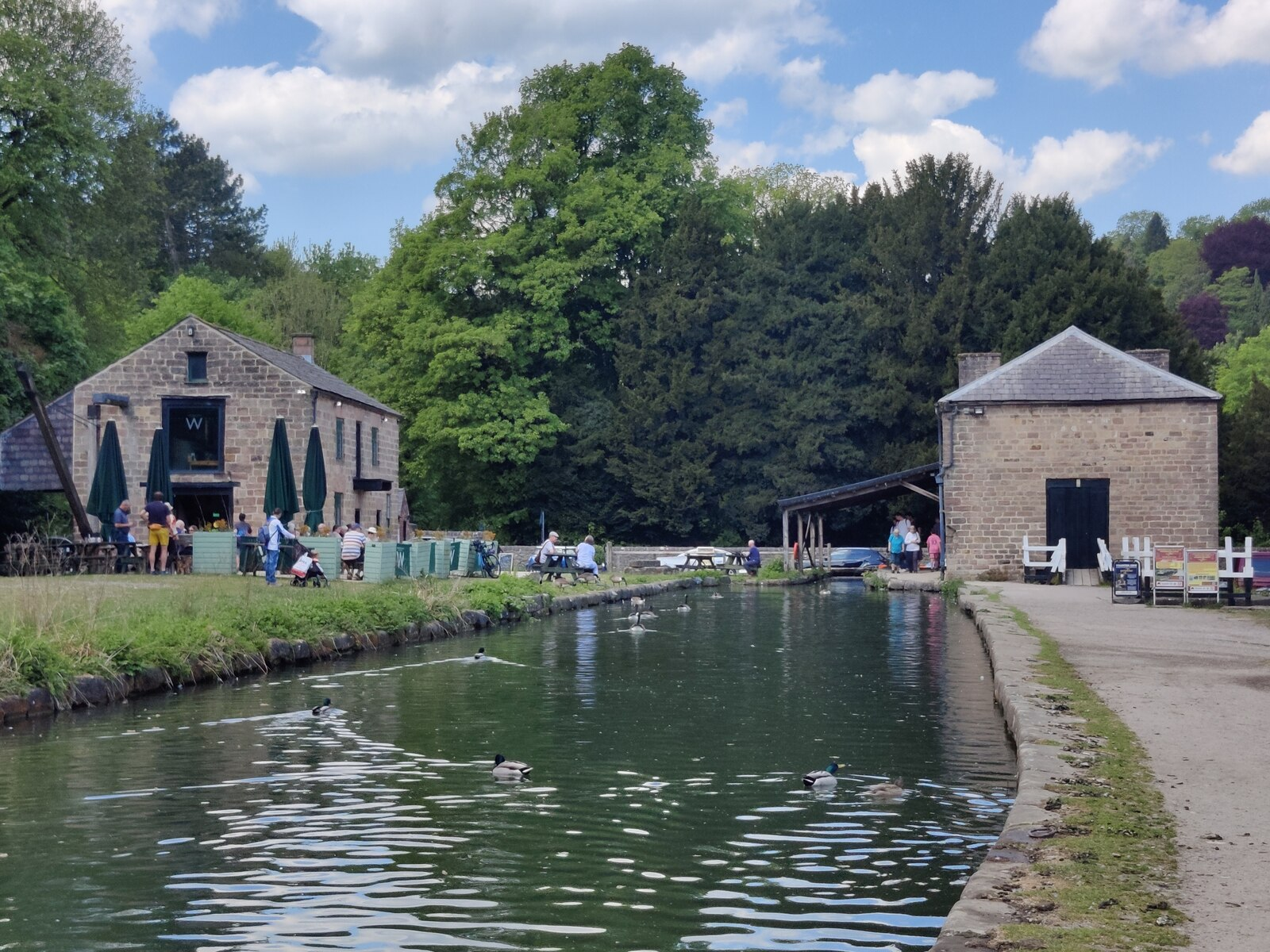
- Cromford Wharf
- Length: 88 km (55 mi)
- Location: Derbyshire
- Established: 2003
- Trailheads: Ladybower Reservoir (north of Bamford) to Shardlow
- Use: Walking
- Elevation gain/loss: 1,002 metres (3,287 ft)
- Highest point: 220 metres (722 ft)
- Season: All

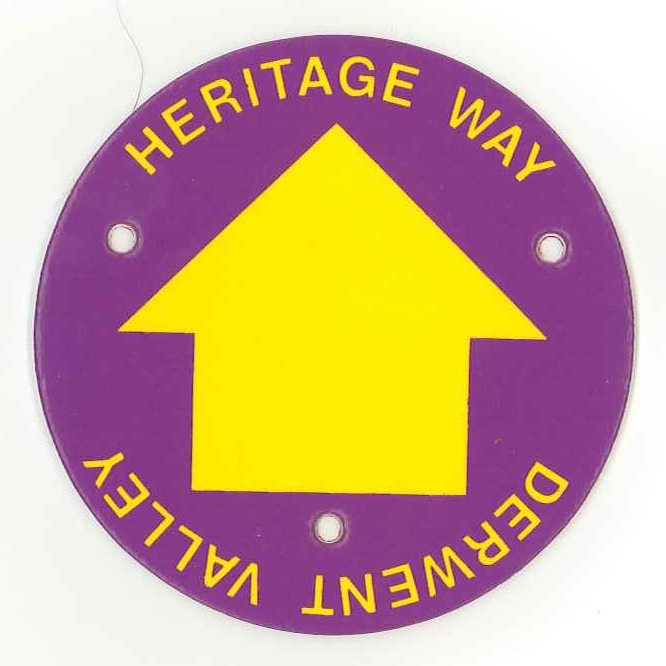
Waymark sign for Derwent Valley Heritage Way

The Derwent Valley Heritage Way (DVHW) is a 55 miles (89 km) waymarked footpath along the Derwent Valley through the Peak District (as far as Rowsley). The walk starts from Ladybower Reservoir in the Peak District National Park via Chatsworth, the scenery around the Derbyshire Dales, and through the Derwent Valley Mills World Heritage Site. It follows the Riverside Path through Derby and continues onwards to the historic inland port of Shardlow. Journey's end is at Derwent Mouth where the River Derwent flows into the River Trent.

The walk was established by The Derwent Valley Trust, which was set up in 1996. The route was planned and developed by Derbyshire Countryside Ranger, Rick Jillings. The Duke of Devonshire opened the walk at Chatsworth House in 2003.

== Route ==
Places on the route and highlights on or near the trail:

=== Ladybower Reservoir to Baslow ===
- Ladybower Reservoir: Heatherdene car park
- Thornhill
- Mytham Bridge
- Shatton Bridge over the River Noe
- Leadmill Bridge
- Hathersage
- Grindleford
- Froggatt: Froggatt Woods, Froggatt Bridge
- Calver: Calver Bridge
- Bubnell

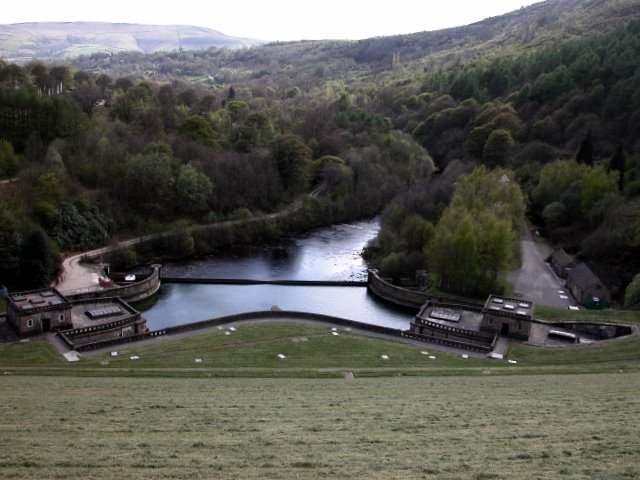
River Derwent from Ladybower Reservoir

=== Baslow to Matlock ===
- Baslow
- Chatsworth Park: Chatsworth House
- Calton Lees
- Rowsley
- River Wye
- Caudwell's Mill
- Churchtown
- Darley Bridge
- Cawdor Quarry

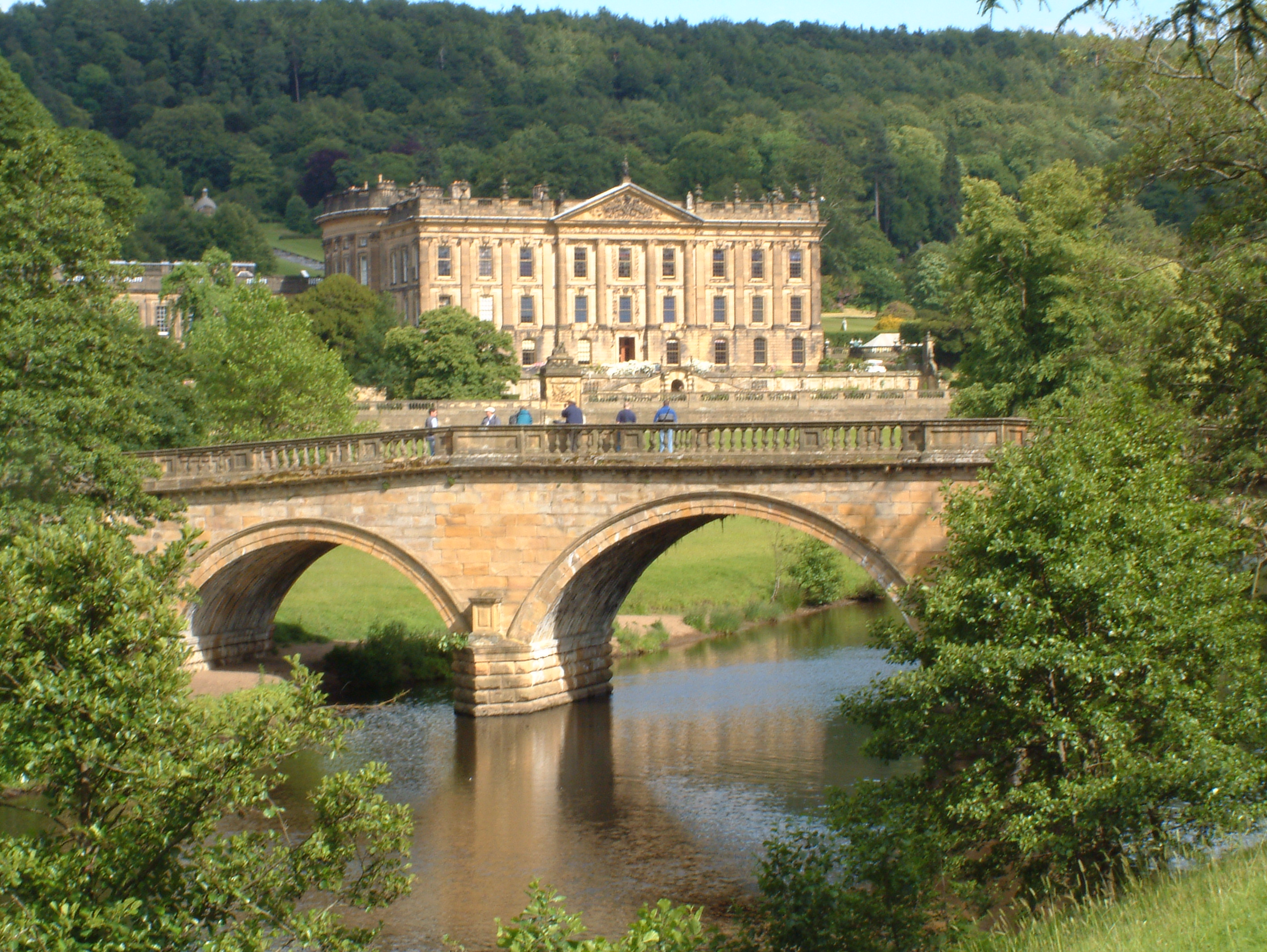
Chatsworth House

=== Matlock to Belper ===
- Matlock: Hall Leys Park, Bentley Brook
- Matlock Bath
- High Tor summit: Derwent Gorge
- Heights of Abraham cable car
- Masson Mill
- Cromford: Pavilion, Arkwright’s Cromford Mill
- Cromford Canal: High Peak Junction, Leawood Pump House
- Whatstandwell
- Ambergate: River Amber
- The Birches (Woodland Trust wood)
- North and East Mills

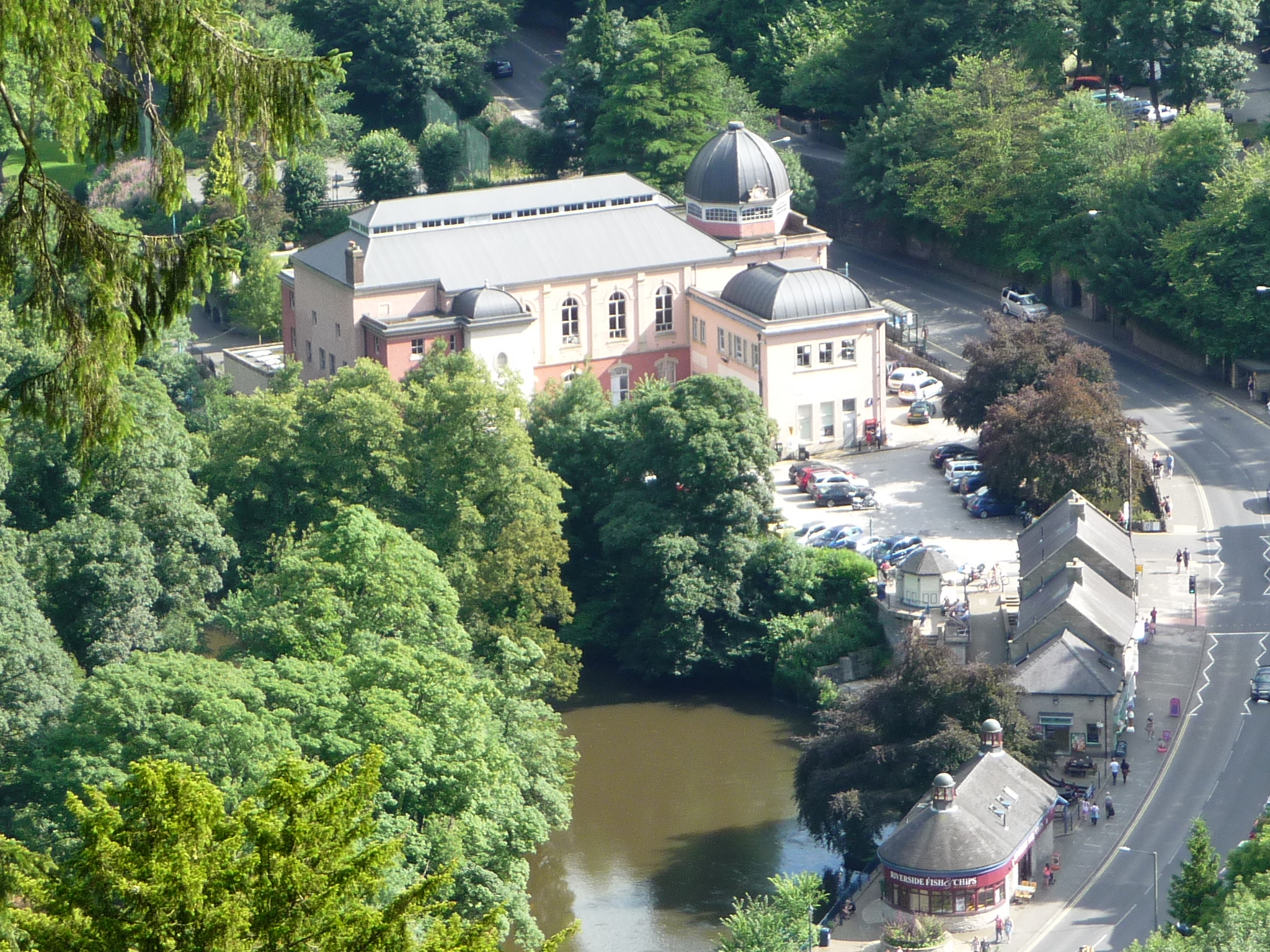
River Derwent at Matlock Bath

=== Belper to Derby ===
- Belper
- Coppice Brook
- Makeney
- Duffield Bridge
- Peckwash Mill
- Rigga Quarry
- Little Eaton
- Darley Abbey: Darley Abbey Mills, toll bridge
- Darley Park
- Derby Riverside Path at Handyside Bridge
- Derby Silk Mill
- River Gardens

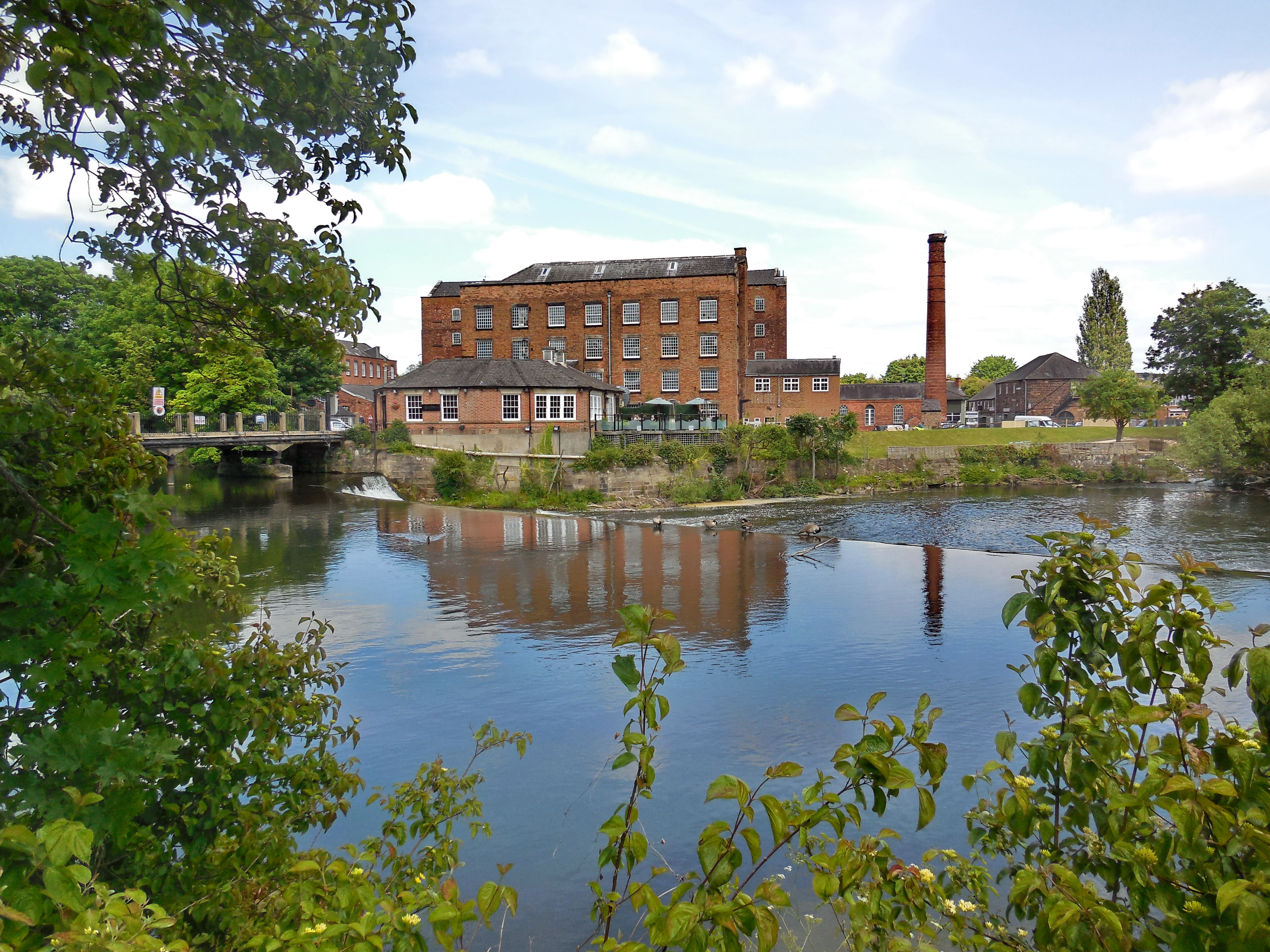
Darley Abbey

=== Derby to Derwent Mouth ===
- Derby: Pride Park, Alvaston Park
- Elvaston Castle Country Park
- Borrowash: Borrowash Bridge
- Ambaston
- Shardlow: Heritage Centre, Clock Warehouse
- Trent and Mersey Canal
- Derwent Mouth: Derwent Mouth Lock, River Trent

== Access ==
Train stations: Bamford, Hathersage, Rowsley South, Darley Dale, Matlock, Matlock Bath, Cromford, Whatstandwell, Ambergate, Belper, Duffield, Derby.

The route is covered by 4 OS Explorer maps:

- OL1 - The Peak District (Dark Peak)
- OL24 - The Peak District (White Peak)
- 259 - Derby
- 260 - Nottingham

Connected paths: Bonnie Prince Charlie Walk, Centenary Way (Derbyshire), High Peak Trail, Midshires Way.

The official guide book is 'The Derwent Valley Heritage Way' published by Bannister Publications, 2ed, 2014.
