= Chee Dale =

Valley in the Peak District, England

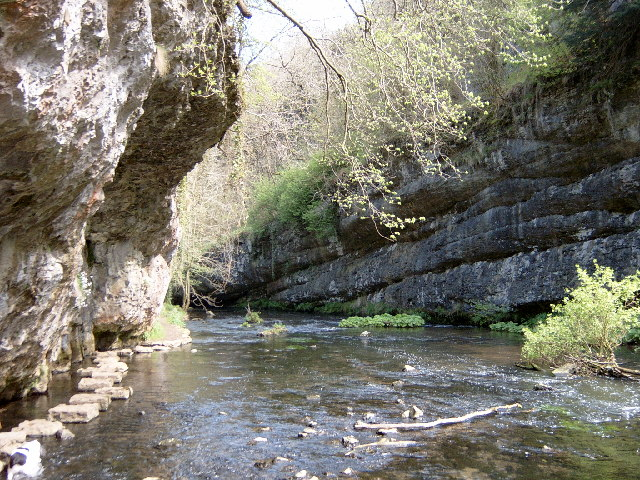
- Stepping stones in Chee Dale

Geography
- Location: Derbyshire, England
- Coordinates: 53.2526°N 1.8218°W
- Rivers: River Wye, Derbyshire
- Interactive map of Chee Dale

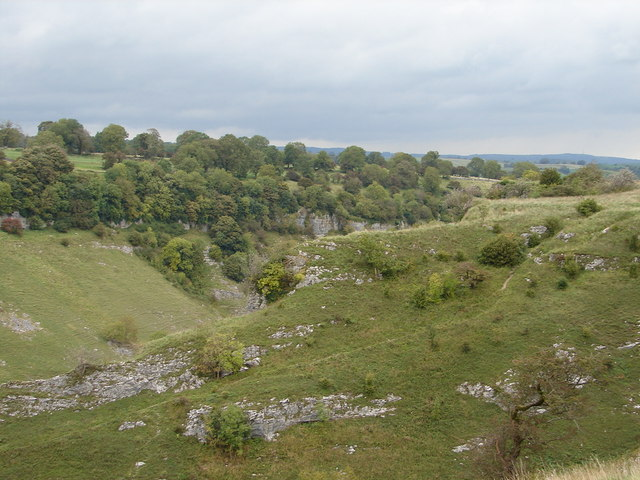
Chee Dale from A6 road

Chee Dale is a steep-sided gorge on the River Wye near Buxton, Derbyshire, in the Peak District of England.

The Wye valley continues upstream towards Buxton as Wye Dale, while downstream are Miller's Dale village and valley.

Chee Dale has a protected nature reserve (close to the village of Wormhill), which is overseen by the Derbyshire Wildlife Trust. The reserve contains ash, yew and rock whitebeam woodland on the cliff sides and abundant wild flowers including cowslips, early purple orchids, rock rose and the rare Jacob's ladder. Dippers are often seen darting low above the river and bobbing on rocks in the river. Other birds nesting in the valley include blackcap, chiffchaff and willow warbler. Chee Dale is part of the Wye Valley Site of Special Scientific Interest (SSSI), running for 15 kilometres (9.3 mi) east of Buxton.

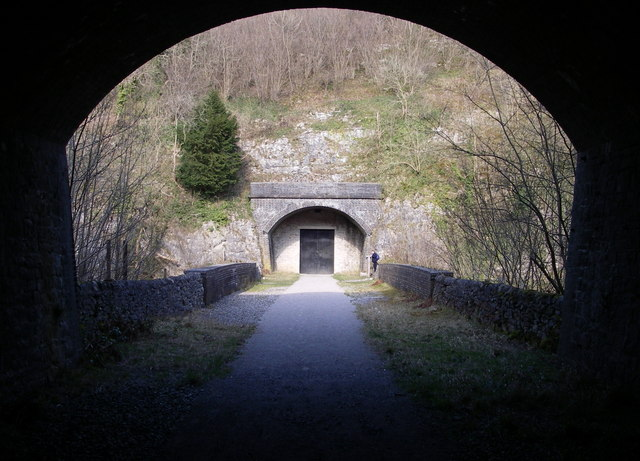
Chee Tor Tunnel

The Monsal Trail bridleway runs for 8.5 miles (13.7 km) from Topley Pike Junction (at the head of Chee Dale) to Rowsley near Bakewell, along the disused Manchester, Buxton, Matlock and Midlands Junction Railway line. It passes through Upper Chee Dale and then enters Chee Tor Tunnels 1 and 2 through to Miller's Dale.

There is also a riverside footpath along the length of Chee Dale with several wooden footbridges over the river. Sets of stepping stones allow walkers to pass the foot of the cliffs.

The crags of carboniferous limestone in Upper Chee Dale and of Chee Tor cliff in Lower Chee Dale have extensive rock climbing routes. These include the overhanging Cornice and Chee Tor. Chee Tor has the Chee Tor Girdle route, a 167-metre (548 ft) horizontal traverse 20 metres (66 ft) above the cliff base, first climbed in 1964 by Chris Jackson and J. Atkinson.

At the head of Chee Dale, Great Rocks Dale enters from the north, at the former railway stations of Blackwell Mill and Chee Dale Halt. Great Rocks Dale is a dry valley and is the site of Tunstead Quarry, one of the largest limestone quarries in the UK.

The Pennine Bridleway crosses the River Wye over a footbridge at Blackwell Mill.

Access into the deep gorge is limited, though it can be reached from Miller's Dale car park. At the west end of Chee Dale is Topley Pike layby, with limited parking by the A6 road. There is also a short steep footpath from Wormhill.
