= Headshunt =

Short length of track to release locomotives at terminal platforms

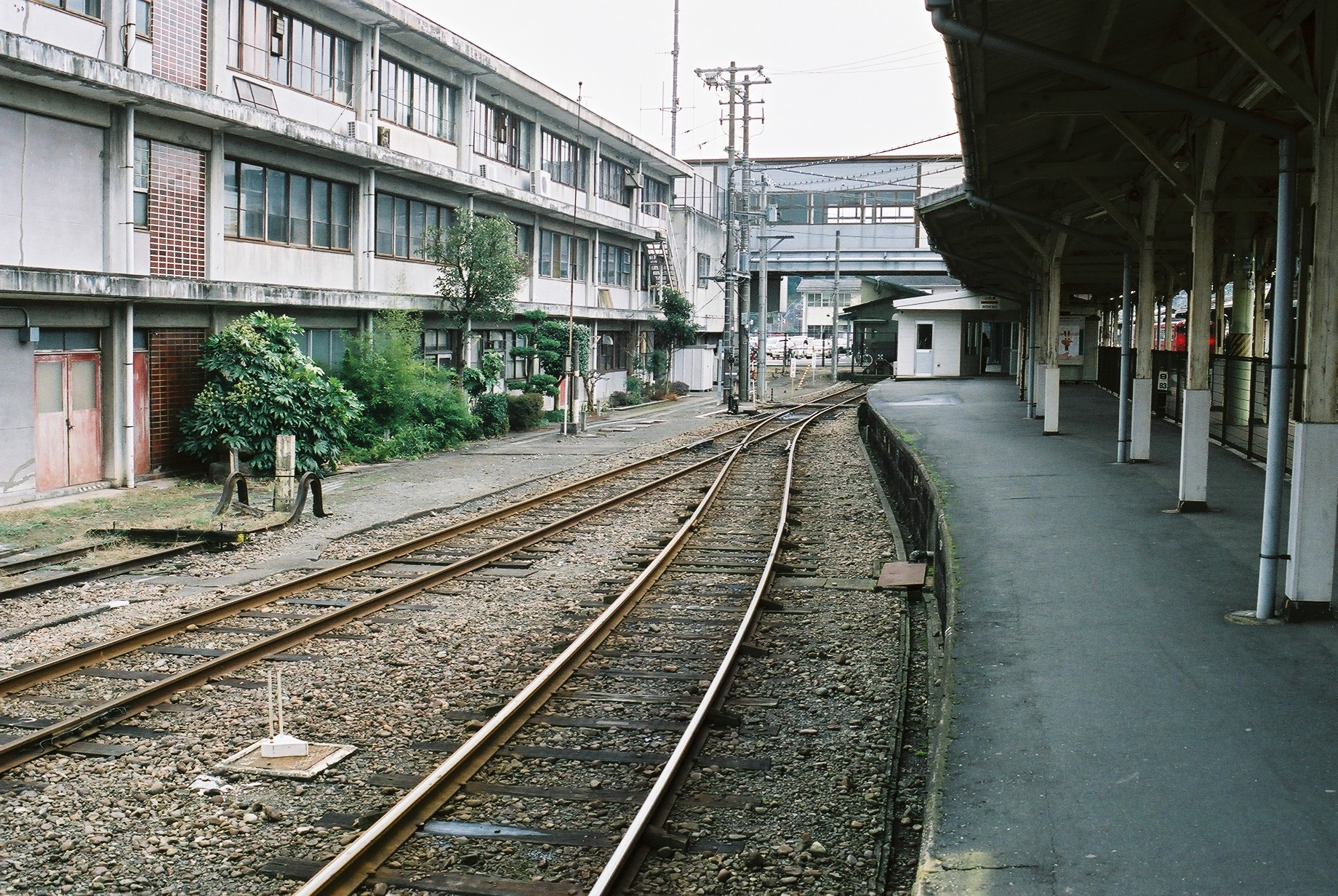
Platform track and run-round loop at Toyooka Station, Hyōgo, Japan, the terminus of the line from Miyazu

A headshunt (or escape track in the United States) is a short length of track provided to release locomotives at terminal platforms, or to allow shunting to take place clear of main lines.

== Terminal headshunt ==
Sequence at a terminal headshunt: 1. train arrives at the station; 2. locomotive is detached from the train and moves into the headshunt; 3. locomotive reverses and the points are switched; 4. locomotive travels along the passing loop to pass the cars; 5. locomotive reverses direction and the points are switched; 6. locomotive couples to the opposite end of the train; 7. locomotive reverses and the train departs

A 'terminal headshunt' is a short length of track that allows a locomotive to uncouple from its train, move forward, and then run back past it on a parallel track. Such headshunts are typically installed at a terminal station to allow the locomotive of an arriving train to move to the opposite end of (in railway parlance, 'run around') its train so that it can then haul the same train out of the station in the other direction (assuming, of course, that it is a locomotive equipped to run in either direction; for locomotives that only operate in one direction, a wye or turntable needs to be provided to physically turn the engine around, as well as a run-around track).

== Reversing headshunt ==
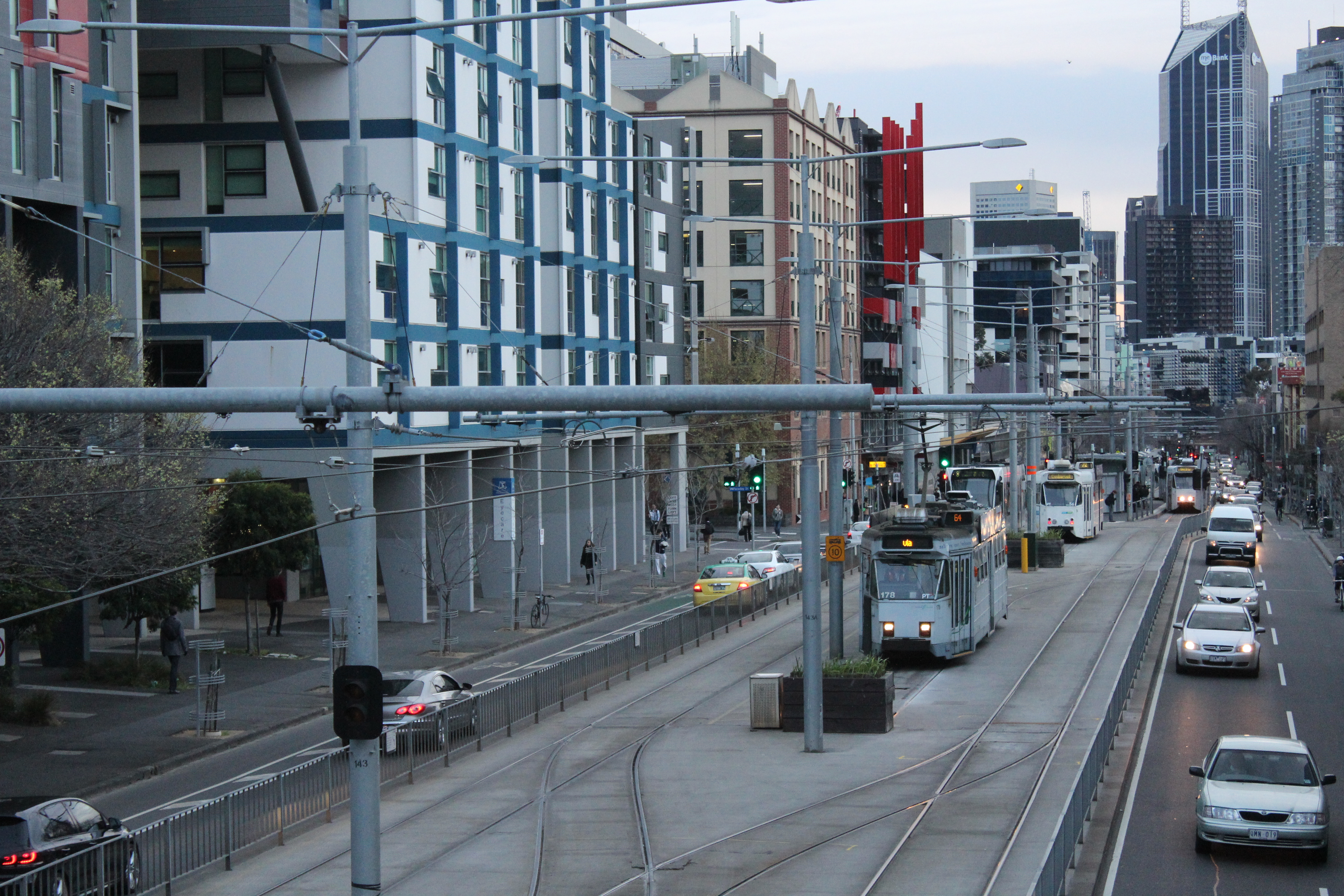
Melbourne University tram stop has three reversing headshunts in succession, between the two running lines.

Found primarily on metro systems, rapid transit light rail networks, and tramways, a 'reversing headshunt' allows certain trains or trams to change direction, even on lines with high traffic flow, whilst others continue through the station.

== Shunting neck ==
The term headshunt may also refer to shunting neck or 'shunt spur': a short length of track laid parallel to the main line to allow a train to shunt back into a siding or rail yard without occupying the main running-line.

== Run round ==
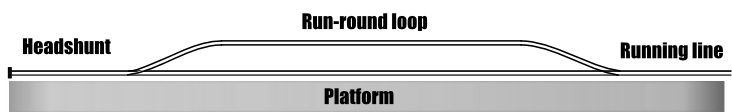
Diagram of a headshunt and run round loop

A run round loop (or run-around loop) is a track arrangement that enables a locomotive to attach to the opposite end of the train. It is commonly used to haul wagons onto a siding, or at a terminal station to prepare for a return journey. This process is known as "running round a train".

Although a common procedure for passenger trains when the majority of them were locomotive-hauled, the maneuver is now becoming rarer on public service railways. Increased use of multiple unit and push-pull passenger services avoids the requirement for dedicated track and the need for railway staff to detach and reattach the locomotive at track level. However, on heritage railways run-round loops are still usually more or less necessary at each end of the running line, partly because train services are usually locomotive-hauled, and partly because the run-round operation gives added interest to visitors. This practice is still very common on Intercity services in Victoria, Australia.

Runaround tracks are used in freight rail service in order to back cars into spurs or to change directions to keep the locomotive at the front of the train for transport. In this case the runaround track must be as long as the longest set of cars that would be pulled. The locomotive leaves the cars on the runaround track or the main line, goes around, and hooks up to the other end of the train. It can then reverse the cars into a spur.

=== Examples ===
Stations which used to have run-rounds include:

- United Kingdom
  - Edinburgh Waverley railway station; The terminal platforms of this station featured locomotive release roads between two main platforms, connected by a three-way point to the crossover from each platform line. The same arrangement of a three-way point on a central release road was also installed at the now closed stations:
    - Manchester Central
    - Liverpool Exchange
    - Leeds Central
  - St Ives railway station
  - Matlock Riverside railway station, now closed
  - Birmingham Moor Street. This station is on a confined site, so to save space the platform lines were equipped with traversers to allow locomotives to run round via the adjacent platform line (platforms 1 & 2) or an adjacent loop (platform 3).
  - Withernsea, the terminal station on the now closed Hull and Holderness Railway. At this station, instead of a crossover or points the run round loop was accessed from a turntable at the end of the platform line and run round loop. There was a similar arrangement at Ventnor and Bembridge railway stations on the Isle of Wight.
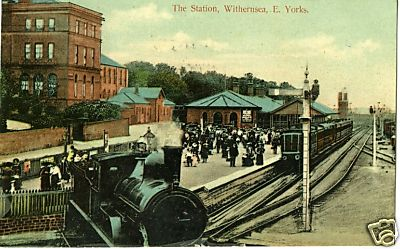
Turntable and run round loop at Withernsea

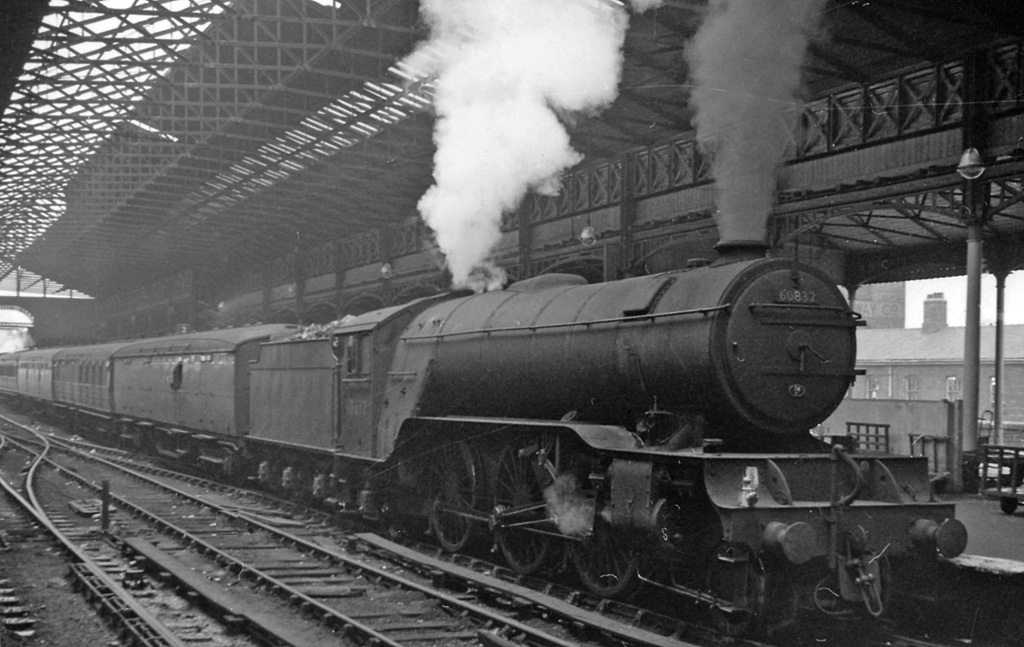
Leeds Central station showing the release crossovers
- Australia
  - Murwillumbah railway station, now closed
  - Toronto railway station, New South Wales, now closed
  - Cronulla railway station, had run-round, but never had locomotives
  - Newcastle railway station, New South Wales, now closed; run-round on Platform 1&2, not on Platform 3&4

Stations which still have run-rounds include:

- United Kingdom
  - Weymouth railway station
  - Fort William railway station
  - Morecambe railway station
  - Rowsley South railway station
  - Mallaig railway station
- Germany
  - Hagen Hauptbahnhof
- Australia (all in regular loco-hauled passenger use unless otherwise indicated)
  - Central railway station, Sydney
  - Albury railway station
  - Canberra railway station (run-around not in regular use)
  - Southern Cross railway station (Melbourne)
  - Shepparton railway station
  - Bairnsdale railway station
  - Geelong railway station
  - South Geelong railway station
  - Marshall railway station
  - Warrnambool railway station
  - Swan Hill railway station
  - Seymour railway station
  - Roma Street railway station (Brisbane) (not sure if run-around in use)
  - Toowoomba railway station
  - Charleville railway station
  - Rockhampton railway station
  - Longreach railway station
  - Townsville railway station
  - Mount Isa railway station
  - Cairns railway station
  - Kuranda railway station
  - Adelaide Parklands Terminal
  - Public Transport Centre (East Perth terminal)
  - Darwin railway station

== No loop ==
If a terminal station does not have a run-round loop trains are restricted to multiple units or Top and Tail trains.

== See also ==
- Backshunt
