= Chee Dale Halt railway station =

Former railway station in Derbyshire, England

Coordinates: 53.25052°N 1.83353°W

Chee Dale Halt
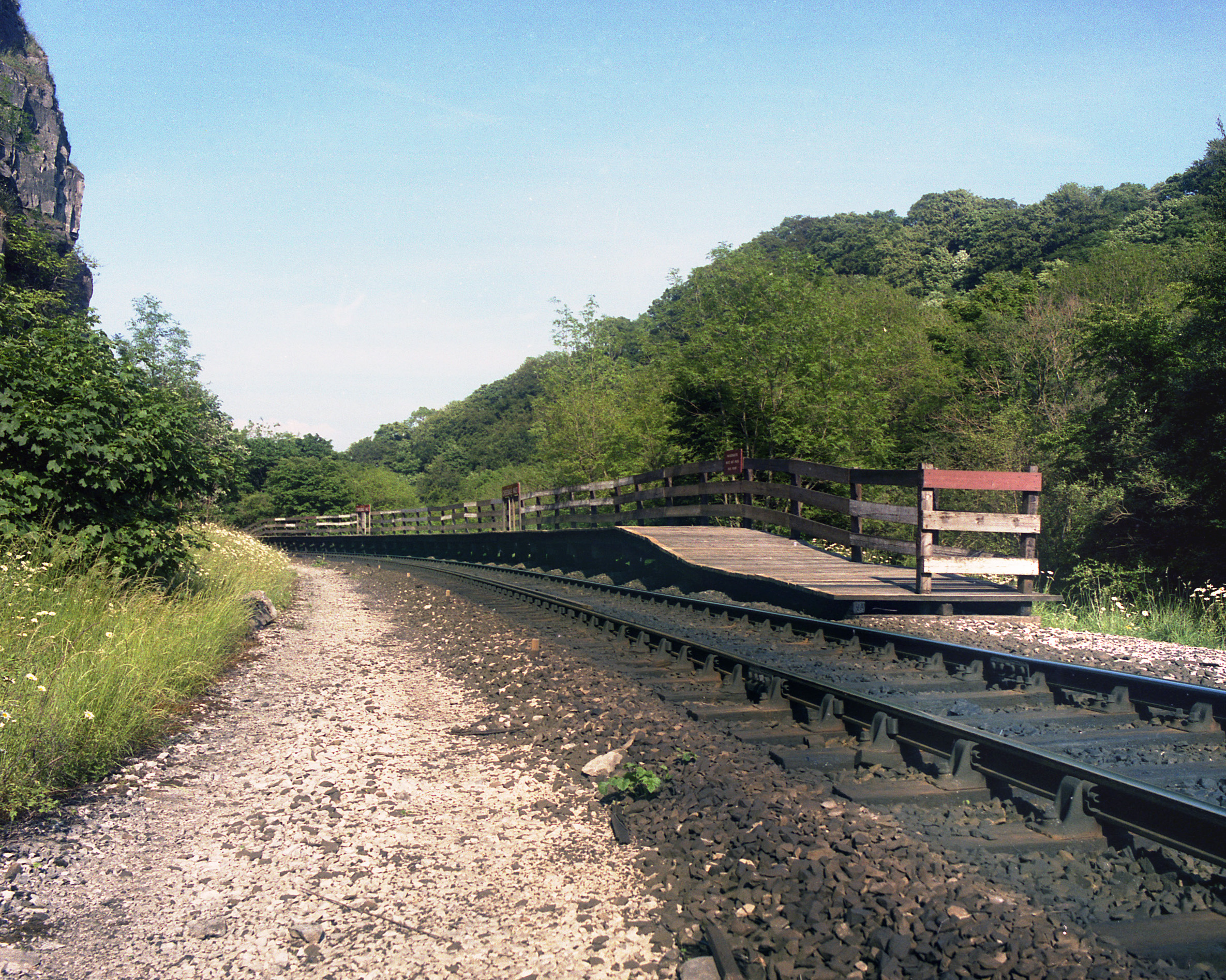
- Chee Dale Halt in 1989. Note that the station signs were still present two years after closure.

General information
- Location: Buxton, High Peak; England
- Platforms: 1

Other information
- Status: Disused

History
- Original company: British Rail

Key dates
- 5 July 1987: Opened
- 13 September 1987: Closed
Location

Chee Dale Halt railway station was a timber-built railway halt located on the Peak Forest Junction to Buxton Junction spur of a triangle of the former Midland Railway lines at Blackwell Mill. The halt was opened on 5 July 1987 by British Rail and used for a summer Sundays-only passenger service promoted by Peak Rail that ran between Edale railway station and Chee Dale, and closed on 13 September 1987.

== Use ==
The halt was used primarily by ramblers on the nearby Monsal Trail. There was no road access to the halt.

== Closure ==
The passenger train ran for one summer season, until the Health and Safety executive raised concerns that the signalling along the line was not adequate for passenger trains. British Rail decided that it would not be economically viable to upgrade the signalling for a summer Sundays-only service, and the halt closed on 13 September 1987 after the last train left. The halt remained for a few years after closure, but was removed in the early 1990s to become Peak Rail's Matlock Riverside station. The line is still open for freight services.

Preceding station	Disused railways	Following station
Terminus	British Rail	Edale; Line closed, station open
