= Matlock railway station =

Railway station in Derbyshire, England

Coordinates: 53.138°N 1.559°W

Matlock
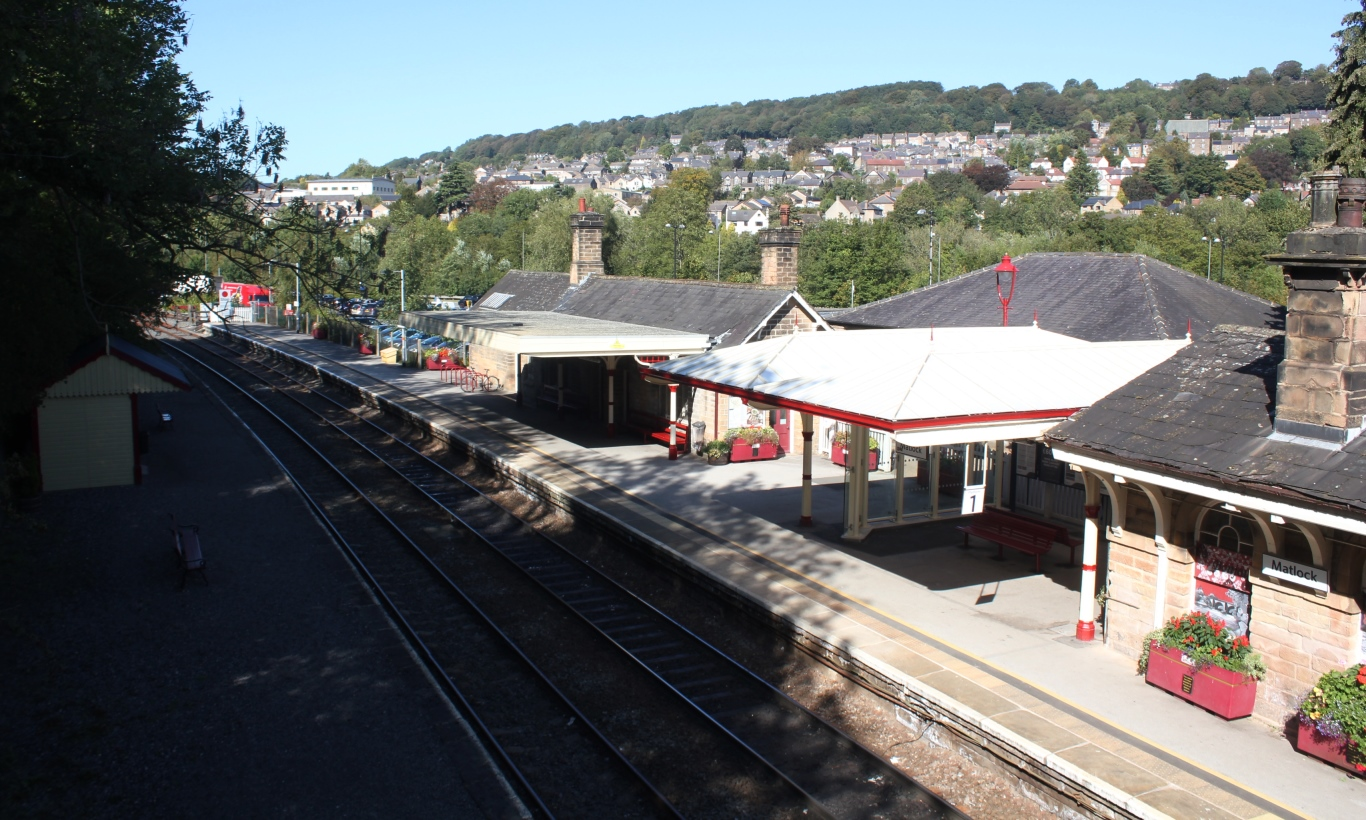
- Looking westwards in 2019

General information
- Location: Matlock, Derbyshire Dales; England
- Grid reference: SK296602
- Manager: East Midlands Railway
- Platforms: 2 (1 National Rail) (1 Peak Rail)

Other information
- Station code: MAT
- Classification: DfT category F1

History
- Opened: 4 June 1849

Passengers
- 2021/22: ▲0.149 million
- 2022/23: ▲0.174 million
- 2023/24: ▲0.190 million
- 2024/25: ▲0.227 million
- 2025/26: ▲0.243 million
Location
Notes
- Passenger statistics from the Office of Rail and Road

Matlock railway station serves the town of Matlock, in the Derbyshire Dales of Derbyshire, England. The station is the terminus of both the Derwent Valley Line from Derby and Peak Rail, which operates heritage services to Rowsley South. Both lines are formed from portions of the Midland Railway's former main line to Manchester Central; through running is technically possible, but is not done in normal service. The station is owned by Network Rail and managed by East Midlands Railway.

== History ==
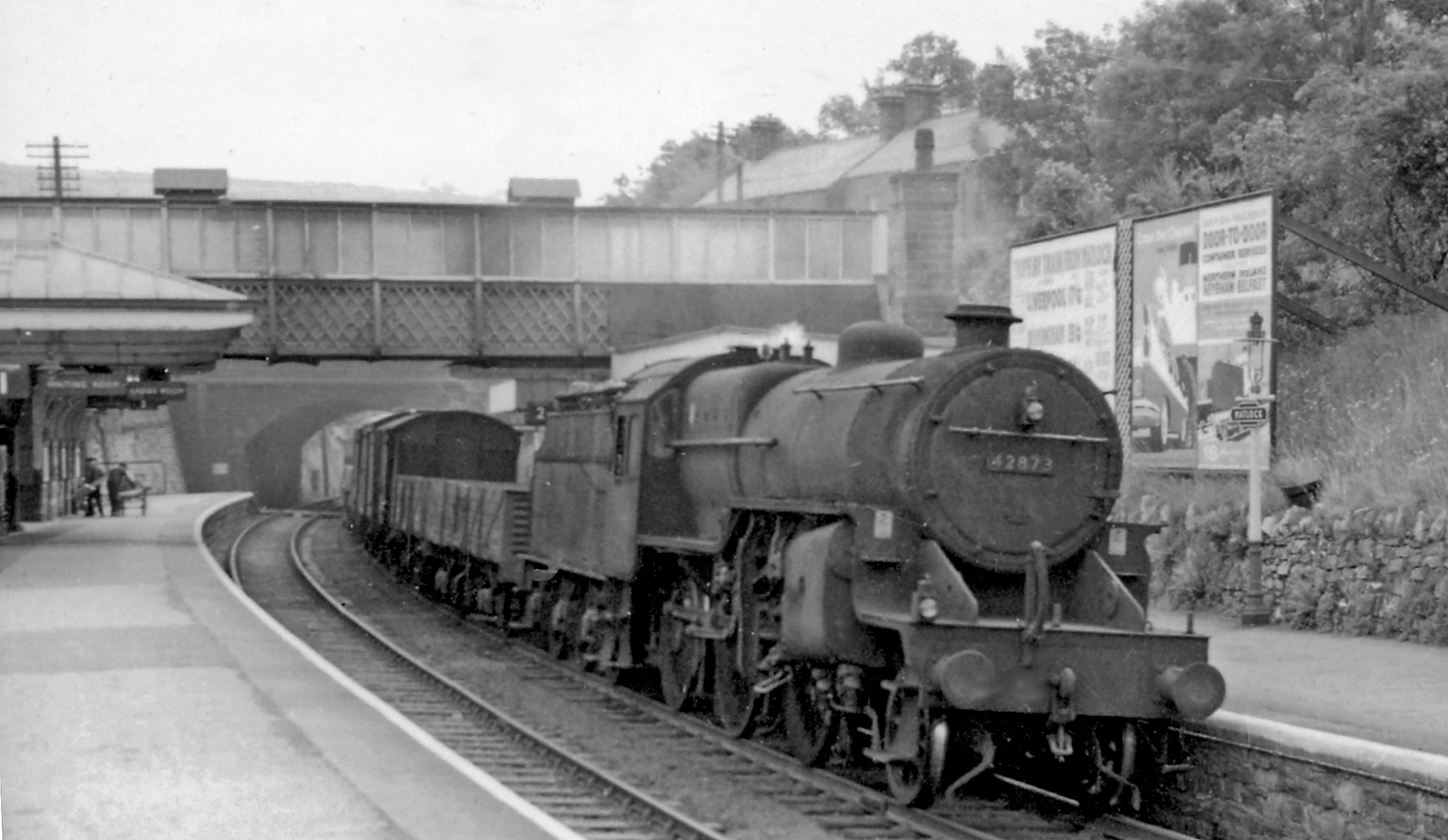
The station in 1961, showing the original footbridge

Originally named Matlock Bridge, it was opened by the Manchester, Buxton, Matlock and Midland Junction Railway. The station saw its first passengers on 4 June 1849, when the line between Ambergate and Rowsley opened. The station buildings, designed by Sir Joseph Paxton, opened in 1850.

The station master's house is now Grade II listed.

Leaving Matlock Bath, the line immediately passes into the series of High Tor tunnels, 321 yards (294 m), 58 yd (53 m) and 378 yd (346 m) long on the east side of the river, cut into the cliff side. Crossing the river and the main A6 road, the line passes through Holt Lane Tunnel (126 yd or 115 m) before entering Matlock station. Being cut through limestone, these tunnels have required a deal of maintenance over the years.

A double-track railway line used to continue from Matlock via Bakewell and Millers Dale, with a branch to Buxton; it continued on through Peak Forest to Chinley and ultimately Manchester Central. This section of the former Midland Railway's main line to Manchester Central was closed to passengers in 1968.

Contrary to popular belief, the line was not recommended for closure in part 1 of the Beeching report, The Reshaping of British Railways; however, in part 2, The Development of the Major Railway Trunk Routes, five routes over the Pennines were evaluated for future development and the Peak Forest line was not one of the two routes selected for enhancement. This, in combination with the electrification of the West Coast route from London Euston to Manchester Piccadilly, ultimately led to the closure of the route.

The last day of operation beyond Matlock was Saturday 29 June 1968, two months before regular main-line steam was fully abolished.

=== Recent history ===
Part of the route north of Matlock is now preserved as a heritage railway by the railway preservation group Peak Rail.

At present, the heritage line operates for a distance of a little under 3 1/2 miles (5.6 km) from Rowsley South; it travels through Darley Dale and nearby Matlock Riverside, and terminates at Matlock station in the former down platform, interchanging there with National Rail services on the Derwent Valley Line.

Before 2004, former train operating company Midland Mainline ran through services into London St Pancras, whilst Central Trains ran some trains to/from Birmingham New Street. A period of through running to/from Nottingham via Derby began in late 2008 and, from May 2015, most weekday trains ran to/from Newark Castle via Derby and Nottingham. Weekend services continued to start/end at Nottingham for another year but, from May 2016, most Saturday services were extended to Newark Castle, leaving Sunday as the only day with no direct service between Matlock and Newark. In October 2021, East Midlands Railway rearranged their service patterns and, as part of this, weekday services from Matlock were terminated at Derby.

Work within the adjacent Cawdor Quarry resulted in a new superstore for Matlock being opened in 2007; several hundred new homes are planned to be located nearby. Matlock bus station has also been relocated, so it is now adjacent to the railway station, thus giving Matlock a true transport interchange. In the year 1 April 2009 to 31 March 2010, journeys from the station had increased by 40.70%.

== Station layout and facilities ==
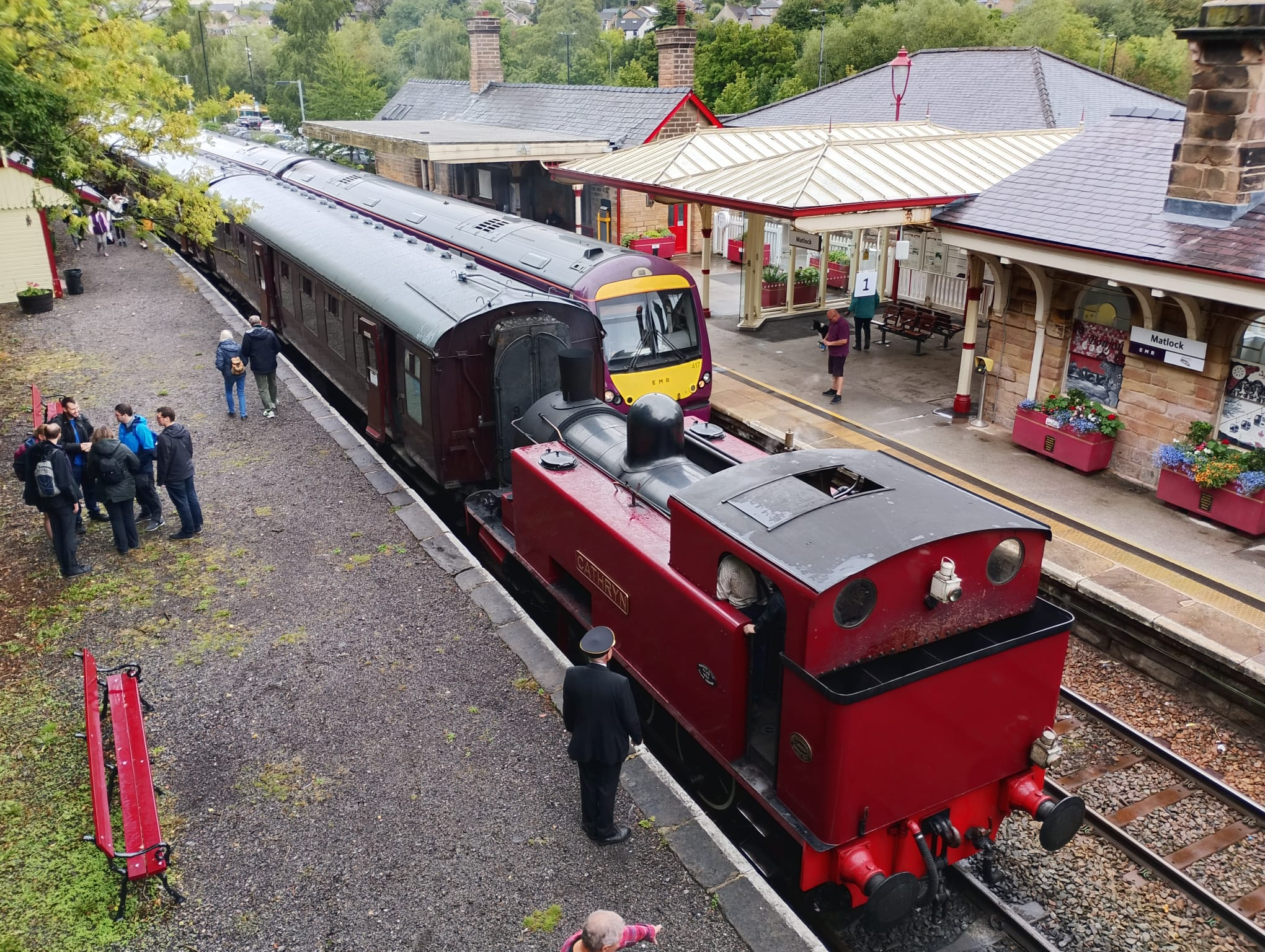
A Peak Rail service at Platform 2 and an East Midlands Railway service at Platform 1

The station has two platforms. The former up platform is used by the Derwent Valley Line while the former down platform is used by Peak Rail. The National Rail platform is accessed from the station car park, while the Peak Rail platform is accessed by a small ramp at the north end connecting to a footpath alongside the station. A footbridge at the south end of the station connects the footpath to the car park. The station building, which is located on the former up platform, is occupied by Peak Rail's transport book shop and a limited station buffet.

The track beside the National Rail platform is connected at both ends, while the track by the Peak Rail platform is only connected at the north end. To the north of the station is a run-round loop for Network Rail engineering trains. One line of this loop also serves as the access route for Peak Rail trains to run into the station.

The full range of tickets for travel for any destination in the country are purchased from the guard on the train at no extra cost; however, in June 2009, an automatic ticket machine was installed on the platform, enabling passengers to buy or collect tickets bought in advance.

== Services ==
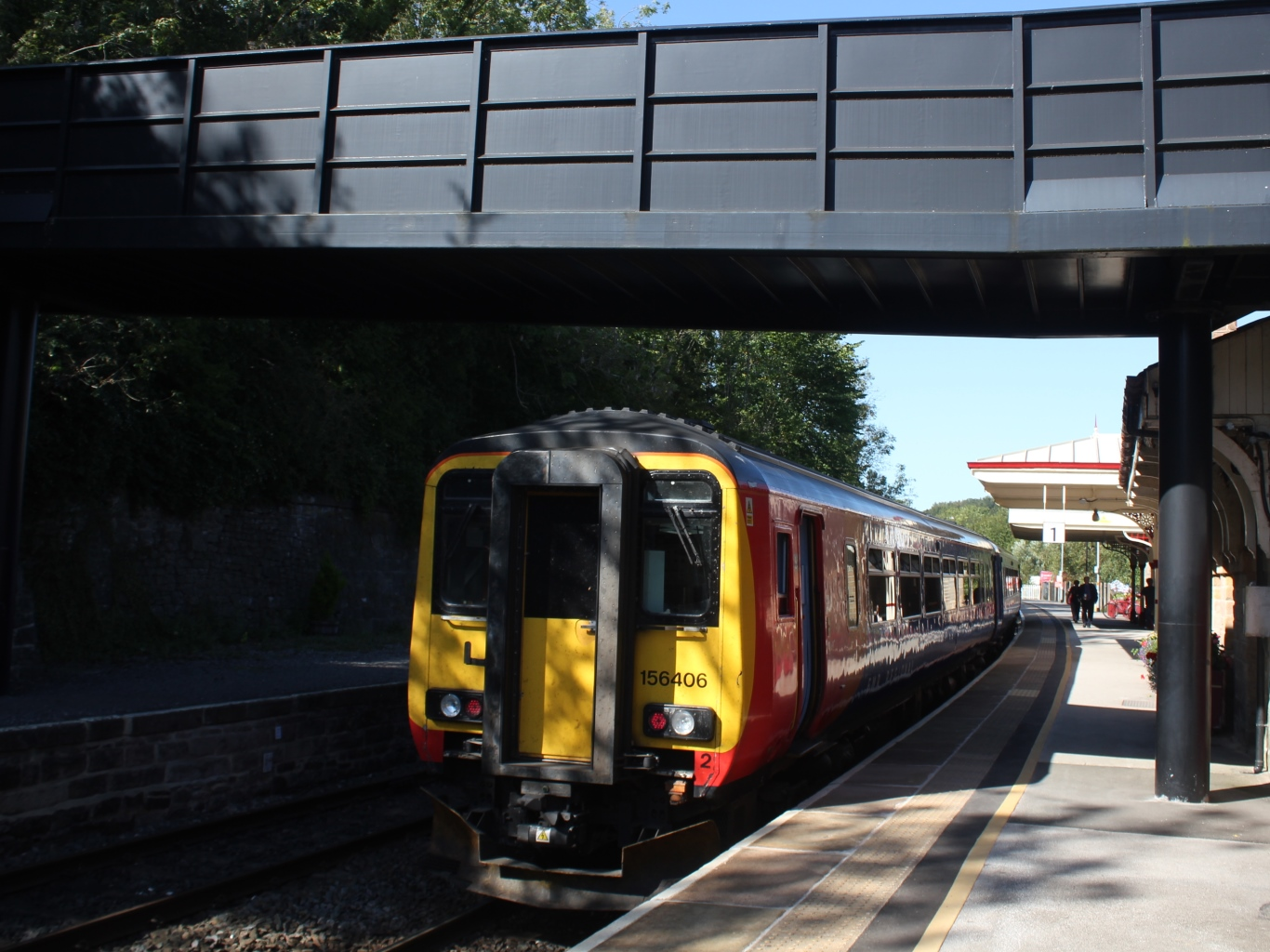
An East Midlands Railway Class 156 under the new footbridge

National Rail services at Matlock are operated by East Midlands Railway, using Class 170 diesel multiple units. The typical off-peak service is one train per hour in each direction to and from Lincoln, via Derby, Nottingham and Newark Castle with one train every two hours extending to Cleethorpes.On Sundays, the station is served by hourly.

Peak Rail services run to Rowsley South on a seasonal timetable during the year, with frequencies increased during holiday periods. Service patterns include the Green Steam, Blue Diesel and Gold High Season timetables.

Preceding station	National Rail	Following station
Terminus	East Midlands Railway Derwent Valley Line	Matlock Bath
Preceding station	Heritage railways	Following station
Darley Dale towards Rowsley South	Peak Rail	Terminus
Historical railways
Darley Dale	Midland Railway Manchester, Buxton, Matlock and Midland Junction Railway	Matlock Bath

== See also ==
- Listed buildings in Matlock Town
