= Rowsley railway station =

Former railway station in Derbyshire, England

Rowsley
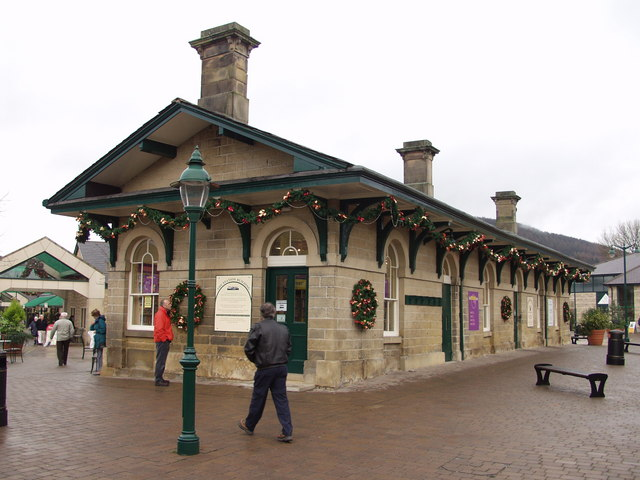
- Rowsley's first station building was designed by Joseph Paxton (1849-62)

General information
- Location: Derbyshire Dales; England
- Coordinates: 53.1905°N 1.6141°W
- Grid reference: SK258659
- Platforms: 2

Other information
- Status: Disused

History
- Original company: Manchester, Buxton, Matlock and Midlands Junction Railway.
- Pre-grouping: Midland Railway
- Post-grouping: London, Midland and Scottish Railway

Key dates
- 4 June 1849: First station opened
- 1 August 1862: Second station opened
- 1 September 1867: Renamed Rowsley for Chatsworth
- 14 June 1965: Renamed Rowsley
- 6 March 1967: Closed
Location

Rowsley railway station was opened in 1849 by the Manchester, Buxton, Matlock and Midlands Junction Railway to serve the village of Rowsley in Derbyshire, England. It was resited in 1862.

== History ==
=== Opening ===
The station was built by the Manchester, Buxton, Matlock and Midlands Junction Railway. Their original plan was to complete a line northwards from the proposed Ambergate, Nottingham, Boston and Eastern Junction Railway at Ambergate that would provide a route to Manchester and the East Coast. The proposal was supported by the Midland Railway which bought shares in the line because it saw an opportunity to run through-trains to London. The Manchester and Birmingham Railway, which would provide access over its own line from Stockport to Manchester, also supported the project for the same reason. However, after its 1846 merger with the new London and North Western Railway, it opposed to any competition into London.

In preparation of becoming part of a trans-Pennine network to the East Coast, the first station (which had been designed by Joseph Paxton) had been built on a northwards alignment. The line from Ambergate terminated at Rowsley. Despite this, in the 1850s, it had a busy trade with sixty to seventy thousand visitors per year passing through the station on their way to Chatsworth House.

The stalemate lasted until 1862, when the Midland decided to build a new track. A new station was built on the extended the line to Buxton (Midland)). The original station building was used as a goods office until the line's closure in 1967. It is now within a shopping centre. Rowlsey's new station was particularly grand, with large first- and third-class facilities and, unusually, a subway between the side platforms to cater for dignitaries visiting the Duke of Devonshire in 1891.

== Express era ==
In 1867, the line reached Manchester and became part of one of the Midland's most prized assets. Besides the London expresses, some of which called at the station, there was substantial goods traffic; this included limestone southwards from the Peak District and, in particular, coal northwards from the Nottinghamshire and Derbyshire Coalfield.

Northwards from Rowsley, the line climbed over 600 feet in fourteen miles to its summit at Peak Forest with punishing gradients. A large motive power depot and marshalling yard was opened in 1877 to provide banking engines and to split trains as necessary. This was not so much due to the lack of powerful engines, but because of the need to limit the strain on wagon couplings. Thus, in theory, a class 8F locomotive could haul 37 wagons, but a banker would still have to be provided. Moreover, account had to be taken of the braking capacity on the downhill stretch towards Chinley, such that larger engines were no more capable than the ubiquitous "4Fs".

The Midland Railway became part of the London, Midland and Scottish Railway during the Grouping of 1923.

== Dairy ==
In June 1933, Express Dairies were granted a 99-year lease on approximately 2,538 square yards (2,122 m^{2}) of railway land, on which to build a creamery. The company were also granted dedicated use of one of the five newly created sidings. Express built a facility that included a milk cooling depot, spray, pond condenser and filter plant. Milk Tank Wagons were normally attached to the 5.18pm local to Derby for Cricklewood or the 10.15pm express freight to Brent sidings. In the 12 months to the end of May 1934, the LMS noted that the carriage value of milk forwarded from Rowsley was £16,886.

== Closure ==
The station closed along with the entire line in 1967; the track was removed. In the 1980s, Rowsley's second station was demolished.

=== Stationmasters ===
- Henry Swift ????–1852
- William Beck c.1855–1875
- Amos Reed 1875–1890 (afterwards stationmaster at Hitchin)
- Thomas Pitt 1890–1897
- Samuel Pitt 1897–1907 (formerly stationmaster at Spondon, afterwards stationmaster at Buxton)
- James Sparling 1907–1913 (formerly stationmaster at Nottingham Road, Derby, afterwards stationmaster at Melton Mowbray)
- J.W. Griffin 1913–1920 (afterwards stationmaster at Redditch)
- W.E. Heming 1920–1925
- Henry Ernest Fews 1925 – ca. 1937 – ????
- George Raymond Hemming ????–1947 (afterwards stationmaster at Spondon)
- Derrick Hoyle ????–1963 (also stationmaster at Darley Dale from 1958)

== Current status and future plans ==
The line has since been reopened in stages from Matlock by Peak Rail as a heritage railway, reaching its present terminus at a new station at Rowsley South, which opened in 1997.

Peak Rail are close to securing a 99-year lease with the local council on the disused trackbed from Rowsley South to the A6 road, at the site of the former station site. Rowsley station will have to be rebuilt.

== Route ==
Disused railways
Bakewell	Manchester, Buxton, Matlock and Midlands Junction Railway	Darley Dale
Preceding station	Heritage railways	Following station
Proposed extension
Bakewell Terminus	Peak Rail	Rowsley South towards Matlock
