= Matlock Riverside railway station =

Railway station in Matlock, England

Coordinates: 53°8′28.1″N 1°34′1.1″W

Matlock Riverside
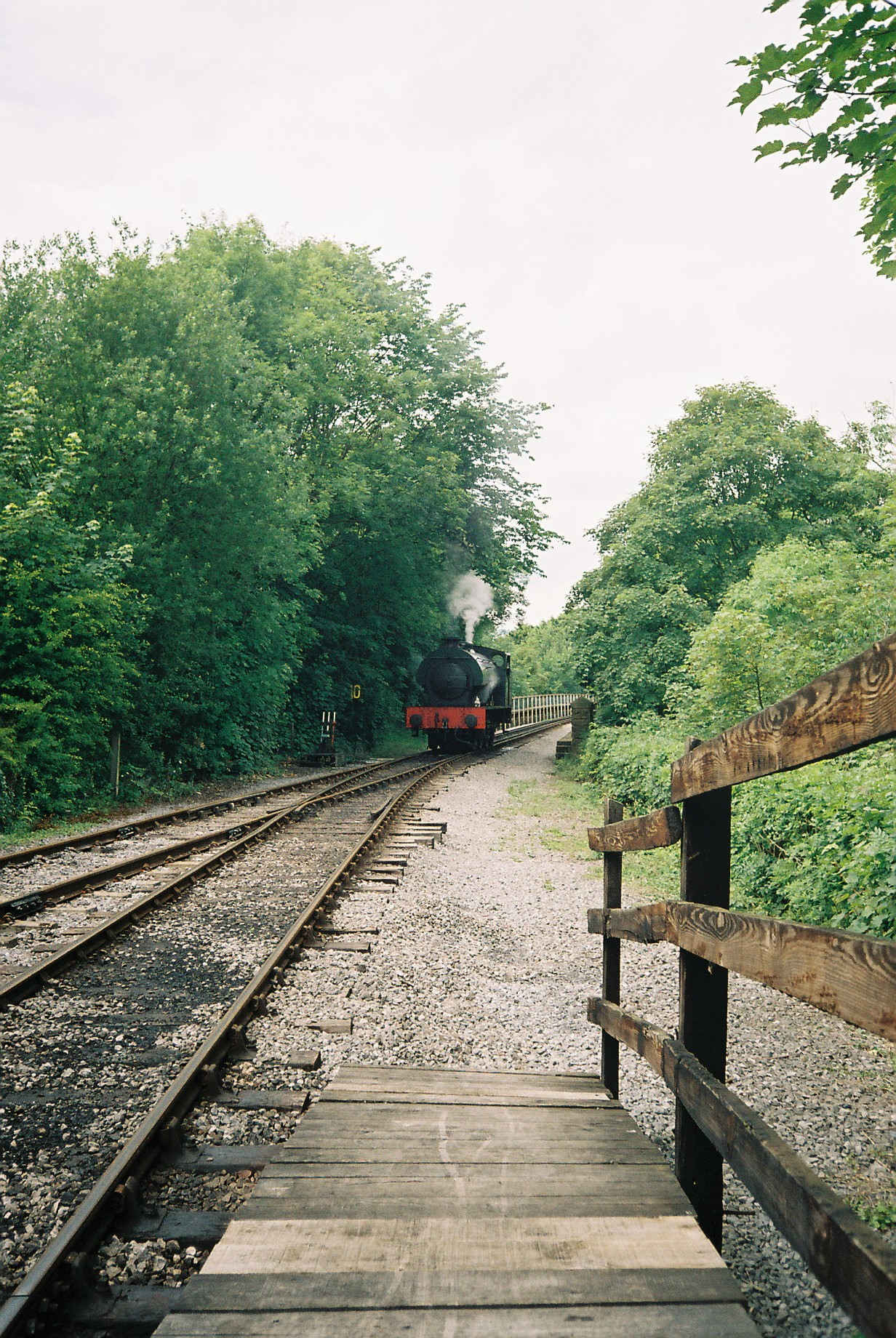
- No.WD 150 'Royal Pioneer' (Peak Rail's main service engine) at Matlock Riverside in June 2007

General information
- Location: Matlock, Derbyshire Dales; England
- Platforms: 1

Other information
- Status: Disused

History
- Original company: Peak Rail

Key dates
- 1991: Opened
- 2 July 2011: Closed for regular operations but used occasionally
Location

Matlock Riverside was the terminus of Peak Rail, a preserved steam railway of approximately 4 miles (6.5 km) in length. For many years Peak Rail had planned to run trains into Matlock station, shared with the main line from Derby (the Derwent Valley Line).

The station was built in 1991 because of problems negotiating with British Rail to run into the station at Matlock at that time. In 2008, Peak Rail negotiated a 50-year lease to run into Platform 2 at Matlock. Track layout adjustments and refurbishment of the Matlock down platform followed and, in July 2011, Peak Rail commenced running services into Matlock station. At that time, it was announced that Matlock Riverside was being retained for special events and demonstration goods trains. It has since also been used for winter trains.

The station itself is a temporary wooden construction, and was previously used at Chee Dale Halt near Buxton when Peak Rail was based at Buxton in the 1980s. Due to operating complications at the Buxton end of the route, Peak Rail moved south to Darley Dale near Matlock and the former Chee Dale Halt structure was re-used at Matlock Riverside.

The station consists of one platform, situated on the Up (east) side of the former deviation, whilst the Down line is used as a run-round loop, which permits the use of a single locomotive on services (although top-and-tail operation occurred on Special Event Days). The current connection to Matlock station branches from the Down side of the line so it is not possible for a train to call at both Matlock Riverside and Matlock stations. Access to the station is via a public footpath from Matlock Town, the distance between the two being no more than one-quarter mile (0.4 km).

For a time, Matlock Riverside possessed a small hut that functioned as a ticket office. After this was frequently damaged by local vandals, the station became permanently unstaffed, with tickets required to be purchased aboard the train.

| Preceding station | Heritage railways | Following station |
|---|---|---|
| Darley Dale towards Rowsley South | Peak Rail Special service only | Terminus |
