= Derbyshire Dales Narrow Gauge Railway =

Railway line in Derbyshire, England

Coordinates: 53.1746°N 1.6095°W

The Derbyshire Dales Narrow Gauge Railway (DDNGR) was a short, 2 ft (610 mm) narrow-gauge railway located at Rowsley South at Peak Rail. It operated ex-industrial diesel locomotives and carriages.

== History ==
The DDNGR was established by Henry and Mary Frampton-Jones at Rowsley South during the 1990s. They had accumulated a collection of narrow-gauge rolling stock at various other railways and needed a running line. At Rowsley South the area behind the turntable was found to be suitable and work started on clearing and laying the track. 1998 saw the arrival of the first items of rolling stock, and the two 40-foot containers used as engine sheds.

In 2001 the Derbyshire Dales Narrow Gauge Supporters Group formed to support the narrow-gauge operation.

Initially, the main running line ran from Nannygoat crossing, through Parkside Station, across a level crossing to a buffer stop beyond where the containers were positioned. A loop was created at Parkside and various sidings laid to access the containers. Top and tail operation was the norm, with a locomotive formed either side of the carriages.

Her Majesty's Railway Inspectorate approval was gained for operations in 2004, and the first DDNGR passengers were carried on Easter Sunday, 11 April 2004. The railway operated on 44 days (mostly Sundays) and carried approximately 1,400 passengers in 2009.

During 2018–2019 the track was lifted and stock sold. The site is now being developed by the Ashover Light Railway Society.

== Rolling stock ==
=== Locomotives ===
All are 2 ft (610 mm), although some were built/rebuilt to different gauges.

Builder	Works Number	Build Year	Details	Image
Motor Rail	435; 3663	1917 rebuilt 1924	40HP Simplex 4wDM. Built for the First World War battlefield supply lines as WD 2156. Originally fully open, but later fitted with the armour protection. Rebuilt in 1924 by Motor Rail 3663 and re-gauged to 2 ft 6 in (762 mm) and sent to St Kitts. Later brought back from Antigua and re-gauged back to 2 ft (610 mm).	
Motor Rail	4572	1929	ex-Birmingham and Rea District Drainage Board (Water Orton)	
Motor Rail	5853	1934	Initially hired out to Merton Eng Co Ltd, Feltham via Petrol Loco Hirers Ltd (a Motor Rail subsidiary) and sold to them on 23 May 1934. It changed hands before eventually being acquired by Rev E R (Teddy) Boston at the Cadeby Light Railway in 1964. It was sold to Pete Wood in 1974.	
Motor Rail	8756	1942	ex-Joseph Arnold and Sons Ltd Silica Sand Quarries, Leighton Buzzard	
Ruston & Hornsby	393325	1952	ex-BR 85049, previously used at Chesterton Junction permanent way depot near Cambridge Now based at the Mountsorrel and Rothley Community Heritage Centre	
Ruston & Hornsby	404967	1957	ex-BR 85051, previously used at Chesterton Junction permanent way depot near Cambridge Now owned by the Ashover Light Railway Society	
Motor Rail	22070	1960	From the London Brick Co.'s Kempston Works, Bedfordshire	
Ruston & Hornsby	487963	1963	4wDM, ex-Butlins, Minehead and Stanley Gravel Pits, Wakefield	
Hunslet	8917	1980	ex Linby Colliery (Nottingham) and Sutton Manor Colliery (Lancashire). Flameproof 4wDHF. Now owned by the Ashover Light Railway Society	
