= Cawdor Quarry =

Disused quarry in Derbyshire, England

Coordinates: 53°08′22″N 1°33′59″W

Cawdor Quarry is a disused quarry in Matlock, Derbyshire. Much of it is designated as a Site of Special Scientific Interest.

Within the SSSI the quarry still contains some old derelict machinery and warehouses. Cawdor Ponds, three lakes left over from the quarrying, are now owned by Matlock Angling Club.

The Peak District is renowned for its quarrying, and stone from Cawdor Quarry was used in the construction of both Hyde Park Corner and the Thames Embankment in London.

Around 2000, the quarry land was purchased by the supermarket giant Sainsbury's who proposed the building of a new supermarket by the spring of 2002. This met much opposition from local shopkeepers and proposals to regenerate most of the centre of Matlock became part of the plan. This included a new bus station (to be located close to Sainsbury's), the diversion of the A6 road, the possibility of making Crown Square into a pedestrianised area where markets could be held and the possibility of making the bridge over the River Derwent one-way. The bus station, the diversion of the A6, and the one-way bridge were all incorporated into the plan which was approved. From January 2007, Birse Engineering started work on developing the new road and Bowmer & Kirkland Ltd, main contractors for Sainsbury's, started work on the superstore. The store opened on Thursday 4 October 2007, with the petrol station opening on 25 October, later that month.

The Peak Rail Heritage Railway centre used part of the former Cawdor Quarry sidings as their connection to the mainline at Matlock. Part of the old loading docks will have to be removed to make way for a new alignment in order to restore the mainline connection at Matlock.

There are also plans to build 400+ new homes at Cawdor Quarry in a development called Matlock Spa. This additional development will occur soon, following on from the completion of the supermarket project.
