= Rowsley =

Village in Derbyshire, England

Coordinates: 53.190°N 1.614°W

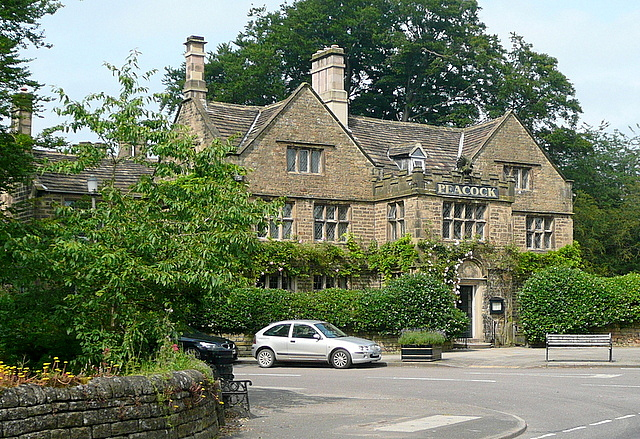
- The Peacock Hotel

- Location within Derbyshire
- Population: 507 (2011)
- OS grid reference: SK258659
- District: Derbyshire Dales
- Shire county: Derbyshire
- Region: East Midlands
- Country: England
- Sovereign state: United Kingdom
- Post town: MATLOCK
- Postcode district: DE4
- Police: Derbyshire
- Fire: Derbyshire
- Ambulance: East Midlands
- UK Parliament: Derbyshire Dales

Pronounced
(listen)

Rowsley (/ˈroʊzli/) is a village on the A6 road in the English county of Derbyshire. The population as at the 2011 census was 507.

It is at the point where the River Wye flows into the River Derwent and prospered from mills on both. The border of the Peak District National Park runs through the village west of the River Wye and immediately to the north of Chatsworth Road. The Peak District Boundary Walk goes through the village.

== Overview ==
Notable features are the bridge over the River Derwent, St Katherine's Church, Rowsley and the Grade-II*-listed Peacock hotel, originally built in 1652 as a manor house by John Stevenson, agent to Lady Manners, whose family crest bearing a peacock gives it its name. Both Longfellow and Landseer are said to have stayed there. Nearby is Chatsworth House, home of the Duke and Duchess of Devonshire.

It was the site of an extensive motive power depot and marshalling yard, the first being built by the Manchester, Buxton, Matlock and Midlands Junction Railway with a railway station designed by Joseph Paxton in 1849. This was replaced by a new station when the line was extended northwards in 1862. It was frequently used by King Edward VII when he visited Chatsworth House. The original station became a goods depot until 1968, when it was used as a contractor's yard. It then became the centrepiece of a shopping development known as Peak Village.

== Railway stations ==
=== Rowsley South ===
Rowsley South is the northern terminus of the preserved heritage railway Peak Rail; it is about a quarter of a mile south of the village itself. The line currently runs for a length of four miles from Matlock.

=== Rowsley ===
Peak Rail are close to securing a 99-year lease with the local council on the disused trackbed from Rowsley South to the A6 road, at the site of the former Rowsley station site. The former station, which is still extant, will have to be rebuilt.

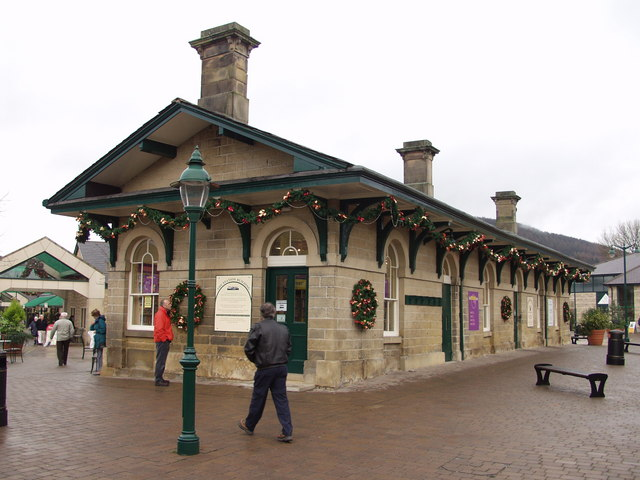
The original Rowsley railway station

Preceding station	Heritage railways	Following station
Rowsley South	Peak Rail; Future Extension	Bakewell

== Notable residents ==
- Phillip Whitehead, MP, MEP, author and Emmy Award-winning television producer, was brought up here.

== See also ==
- Listed buildings in Rowsley
