= Peak Rail =

Heritage railway in Derbyshire, England

Coordinates: 53.1603°N 1.5941°W

Commercial operations
- Original gauge: 4 ft 8 1/2 in (1,435 mm) standard gauge

Preserved operations
- Operated by: Peak Rail
- Stations: 4
- Length: 4.3 miles (6.9 km)
- Preserved gauge: 4 ft 8 1/2 in (1,435 mm)

Commercial history
- Opened: 1863
- Closed: 1968

Preservation history
- 1987: Acquires Darley Dale and track relay work begins
- 1991: Light railway order granted
- 1992: Re-opened
- 1997: Extended to Rowsley South
- 2 July 2011: Extended to Matlock
- Headquarters: Rowsley South Railway Station

Peak Rail is a heritage railway in Derbyshire, England, which operates a steam and heritage diesel service for visitors to the Peak District and the Derbyshire Dales.

The heritage railway line is over 3 1/2 miles (5.6 km) in length and, as of October 2026, operates train services from Matlock station (shared with Derwent Valley Line services from Derby via Ambergate) via the site of Matlock Riverside and Darley Dale to Rowsley South.

Peak Rail intends to extend its operational services northward to Bakewell when resources allow, extending to a total of 4 1/4 miles (6.8 km). Beyond Bakewell, the railway trackbed is used by the Monsal Trail.

== History ==
=== First preservation attempts with the Buxton Steam Centre ===
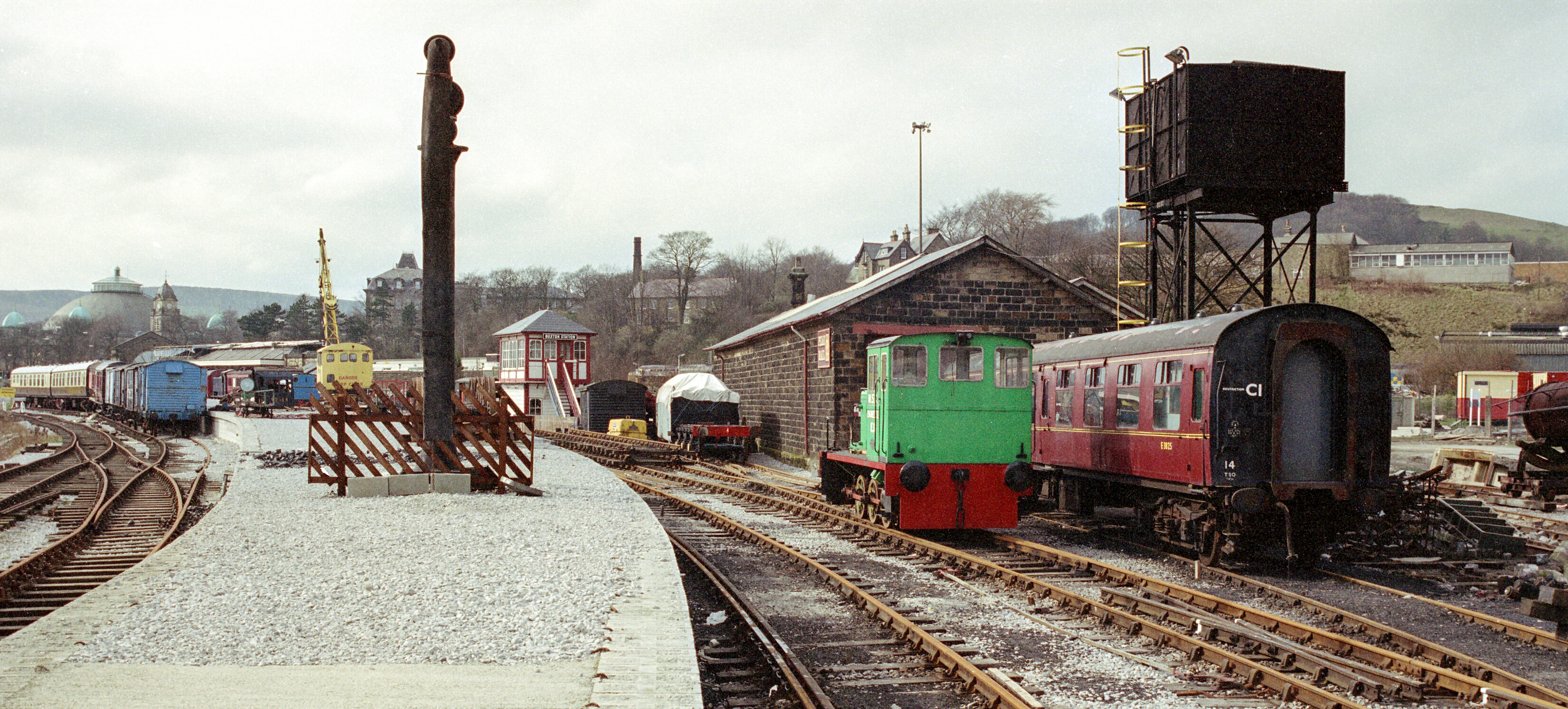
The Buxton Steam Centre of the Peak Railway Preservation Society as it was in March 1990 before closure

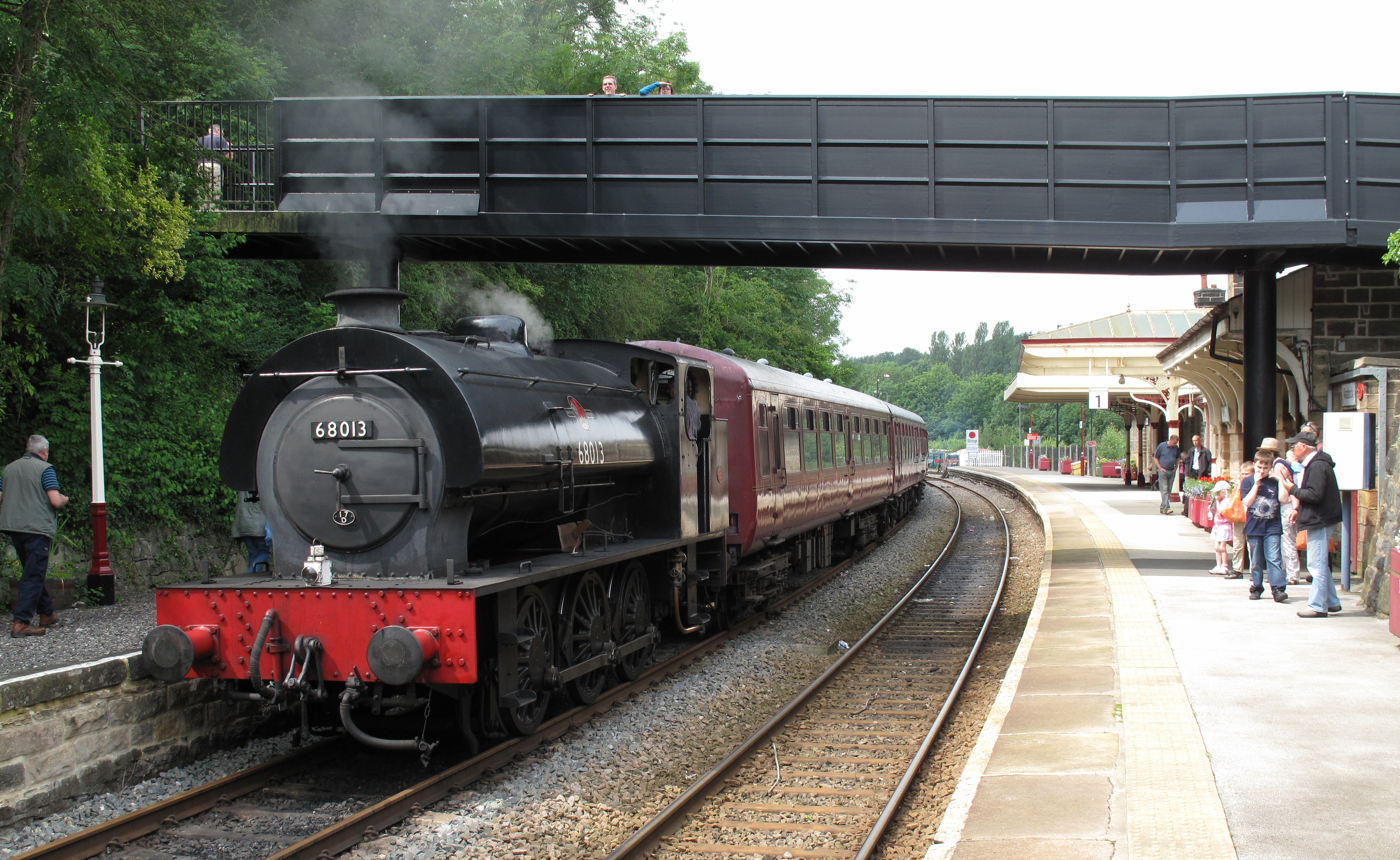
Matlock station with a Peak Rail train hauled by Hunslet Austerity 0-6-0ST 68013, 21st July 2012. The platform on the right is the one used by trains on the Network Rail network.

In 1975, the Peak Railway Preservation Society was established and opened a site at the now-closed Buxton Steam Centre with restoration facilities and a 300-yard (274 m) operating line. Proposals were put forward to extend the operating line onto the single track freight line towards Peak Forest, but were not met with success. However, a bridge was purchased and installed over Charles Street to reconnect to British Rail's Ashwood Dale route. The bridge was never used as the whole site was sold to Buxton Water who built a factory shortly after Peak Rail moved to Darley Dale using funds from the sale. The factory was demolished in 2011 and the site is vacant again and so available should Peak Rail ever reach Buxton.

The BBC reported in 2014 that the station site was proposed for redevelopment.

The Buxton Advertiser reported in June 2019 that Peak Rail intended to reoccupy the Buxton site and start a new Buxton Branch within two months with the first priority being to clear the site. The Peak Rail Association news quotes the support of the local MP however the builder of a new development is causing difficulties with access.

=== Closure of the Buxton Steam Centre and relocation to Darley Dale ===
In the 1980s, Peak Rail relocated its headquarters to Darley Dale and by 1991 the railway had reopened the section of line between Matlock Riverside and Darley Dale.

In 1997, the line was extended within 1/2 mile (0.8 km) south of the Derbyshire village of Rowsley itself. A new station was constructed next to the site of the former loco shed at Rowsley South. The station was capable of holding long incoming charter trains and had a car park to accommodate a large number of cars and other vehicles. The station at Rowsley South has also been used for local charity events and cycle races, as well as steam and vintage vehicle rallies. With its location on the edge of the Peak District, the railway joins other attractions in the area, including Bakewell, Haddon Hall, Chatsworth House, the Rowsley shopping village, the village of Rowsley and the Cauldwell's Mill museum.

=== Extension to Matlock (Network Rail) station ===
After the construction of the Matlock by-pass, and the new Sainsburys supermarket in the former Cawdor Quarry, a new track alignment and track layout was installed between Matlock Riverside and Matlock (Network Rail) station to provide a new connection to the national network.

Discussions regarding access to the Matlock down platform have resulted in an agreed 50-year lease, including the re-connection of the Network Rail and Peak Rail metals. The rails were originally disconnected due to a rearrangement of Network Rail track as a part of other redevelopments in the area south of the present Matlock Riverside station. The extension to Matlock re-opened on 2 July 2011.

== Future developments ==
=== Expansion towards Bakewell ===
- Phase 1 would restore and re-lay track to the site of Rowsley station in Rowsley itself.
- Phase 2 would be reinstating a bridge over the A6 road joining up to Rowsley viaduct, along with restoration of both the viaduct and trackbed as far as a proposed Haddon Halt.
- Phase 3 would then be restoring both the old Haddon Tunnel and Coombes Road viaduct to former use before relaying track into the old station site and restoring the site to its former use.

Negotiations for the lease of the 1 mile (1.6 km) of trackbed to the north have resulted in the offer of a 99-year lease, from Rowsley South to Rowsley village. However, the extension is dependent on the required finance being raised or bequeathed.

=== Monsal Trail ===
Derbyshire County Council and the Peak Planning Board supported a scheme to develop the trackbed from Bakewell to Blackwell Mill as a cycle track, the Monsal Trail. With a stated aim to extend to Rowsley as part of the White Peak Loop Trail, the plans make no mention of the proposed railway extension beyond Rowsley village toward Bakewell.

=== Rowsley South Station Bay Platform ===
Underway currently is the construction of a new bay platform which will add additional capacity to the station. As of Oct 2026 most of the trackbed has been laid with one point off the mainline and another that allows access to a new siding/loading dock.

== Signalling on the railway ==
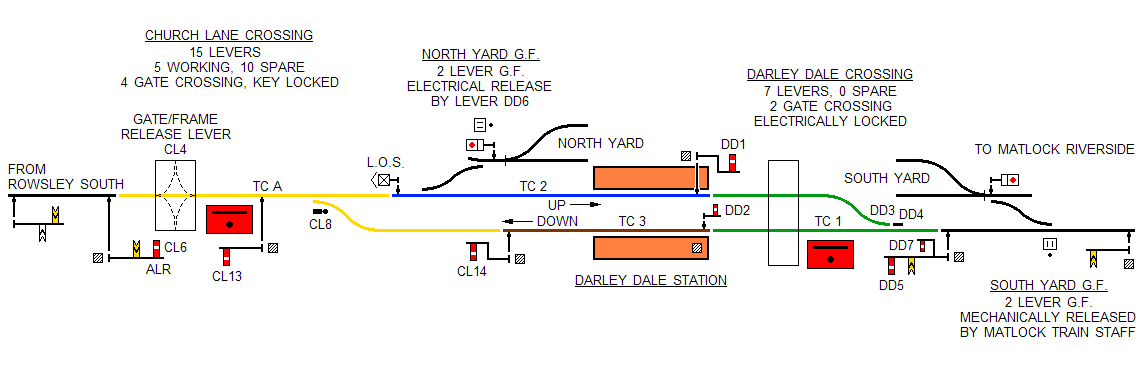
Signalling diagram for the Darley Dale and Church Lane area

There are four signal boxes on the route. Two boxes control the only two level crossings on the old Midland Railway main line route from Manchester to London St Pancras. The crossings are both in the Darley Dale area on the Peak Rail line. The third signal box at Rowsley is being commissioned to control the sidings and be a public viewing exhibit. This is the former Bamford signal cabin from the Hope Valley. There are plans at Rowsley South railway station for refurbishment and future operational use. The fourth cabin at Riverside came from Luffenham. It controls the Matlock connection to the national network.

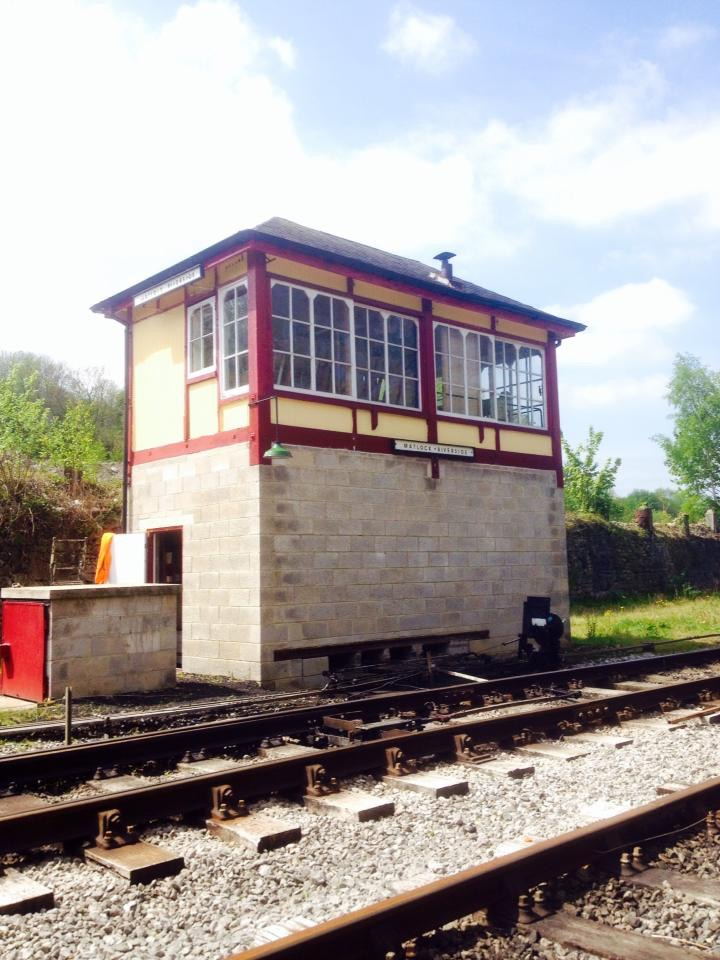
Ex-Luffenham signalbox now Matlock Riverside

- Matlock Riverside: an original British Rail cabin, formerly located at Luffenham junction. The restored cabin is mounted on a non prototypical stone-block base with an internal staircase to protect the box from vandalism, required due to its isolated location. The 19-lever frame was recovered from Glendon North Junction near Kettering. Mechanical interlocking allows the signals exiting and entering the loop via the Darley Dale end to be cleared in opposing directions when the cabin is switched out via the King locking lever.
- Darley Dale Crossing: controls the section from Darley Dale to Matlock Riverside under the one train staff key, as well as the other gated level crossing at Station Road. Based on an L.M.S. ground level design, it was erected in 2007 to replace the older Midland style replica cabin which had become life-expired.

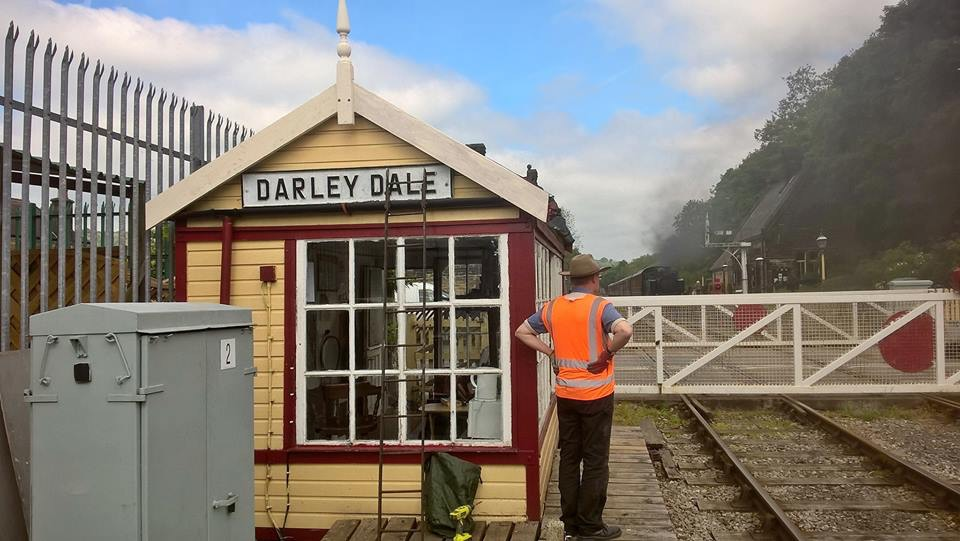
Darley Dale signalbox

- Darley Dale station: the passing loop at Darley Dale is worked using the Absolute Block method, with the signal box at the other end releasing the signal of the adjacent signal box to allow trains to enter the applicable up or down loop line. Due to the small length of the loop all signals are Home Starter combined signals, rather than the traditional separate distant, home and starter arrangements.

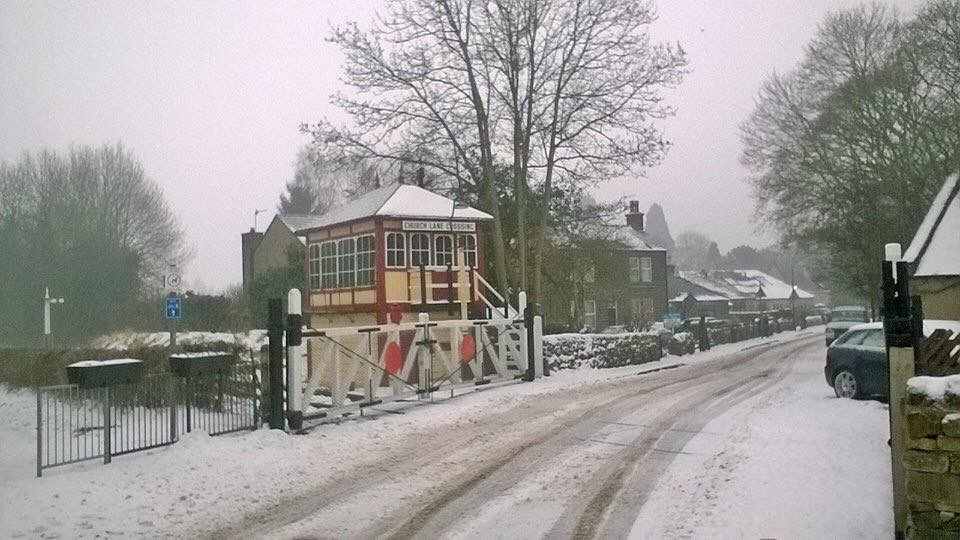
In suitably snowy Derbyshire weather Church Lane signalbox controls the level crossing.

- Church Lane Crossing: controls the section from Darley Dale to Rowsley South under the electric key token block method, as well as the traditionally gated level crossing at Churchtown. Originally this signal box came from Gorsey Bank level crossing on the nearby Wirksworth branch. The signals here are Midland Railway lower quadrant examples on wooden posts dating from 1927. The signal box operates the first preserved example of a "Josslock" motor point, an electro-hydraulically worked electro-pneumatic point machine, whereby a standard electro-pneumatic point is driven by a hydraulic power pack.

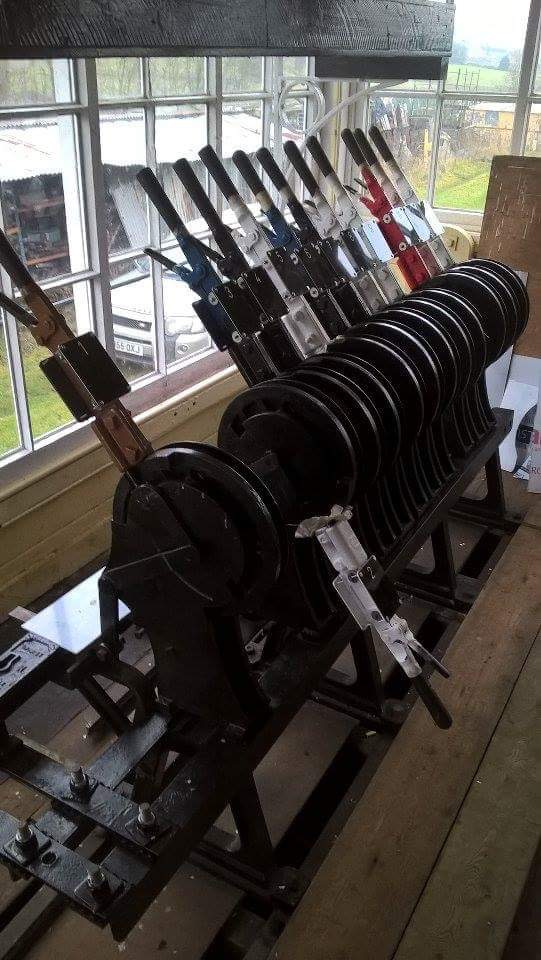
The unique LMS turnover style lever frame which works points and signals via a doublewire method of operation.

- Rowsley South: The Cabin was originally located at Bamford before it was moved to the up platform at Darley Dale initially, though it was never commissioned. Eventually it was moved to Rowsley in January 2014, whereafter restoration began. It will be used to control the loco shed sidings and yard exits as a shunt frame using a unique now in the UK, though still widely used in Europe, double wire driven point operation using the ex Barrow Hill sidings turnover style lever frame kindly donated by the National Railway Museum and point operating gear which has now been installed at Rowsley.

=== Two-train running ===
In late February 2007, the railway's 'Two-Train Running' project was completed and approved by HM Railway Inspectorate. Through improvements to infrastructure and signalling, this project allows two trains in steam on the line, using a refurbished and extended passing loop at Darley Dale. Each section of the railway is worked by a train staff, each with a key to operate the ground frames and electrical signal releases at the signal boxes and the ground frames at Rowsley South, Rowsley North, Darley South Yard sidings and Matlock Riverside.

== Darley Dale footbridge ==
In mid-2009, the original ex-Midland Railway Darley Dale footbridge was purchased from the Midland Railway - Butterley with an aim towards restoration and eventual repositioning at its original location at Darley Dale. Part of this project requires the removal of the unused signal box structure to facilitate the erection of the footbridge. Fundraising for this project began in late 2009 and In 2024 investment from The National Lottery Heritage Fund, The footbridge at Darley Dale station will be restored & The project is being led by the Derwent and Wye Valley Railway Trust. It is planned to be fully installed by Mid-2027.

== Operating groups at the railway ==
Several railway preservation groups are based at the railway, often working in support of and in co-operation with Peak Rail. These include:

- The Heritage Shunters Trust, which has a large collection of former British Railways and private company shunters.
- The now defunct Derbyshire Dales Narrow Gauge Railway, which operated narrow gauge trains over a short running line by the picnic ground at Rowsley. The track was lifted and stock sold between 2018 and 2019.
- The LMS Carriage Association, which restore examples of L.M.S and other coaching stock.
- The Renown Repulse Locomotive Group, responsible for the restoration of two former British Rail Class 50 locomotives.
- Andrew Briddon, who has several of his locomotives based around the Railway with a main base at Darley Dale.
- Other locomotive and stock owners who are restoring wagons and stock upon the line.

For further details see Rowsley South.

== Motive power ==
=== Steam locomotives ===
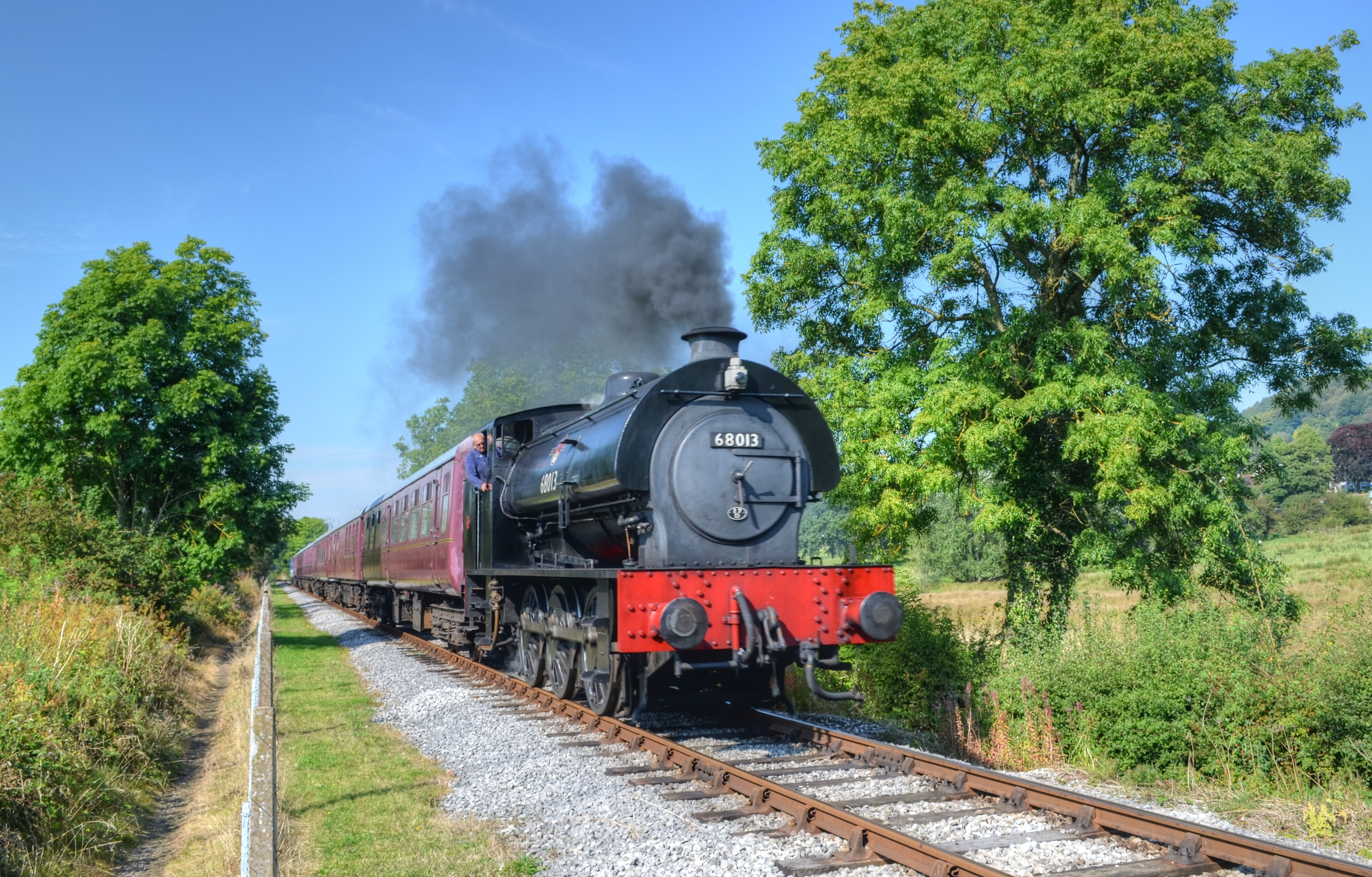
No. 68013 'Royal Pioneer' in service in 2012

==== Operational ====
- Hudswell Clarke Works No 750 ‘Waleswood’0-4-0ST
- Hudswell Clarke Works No. 1884 'S102 Cathryn' 0-6-0T
- Peckett and Sons Works No. 2000 'Peckett 2000' 0-6-0ST

==== Undergoing overhaul ====
- Hunslet Austerity 0-6-0ST RSH No. 7136, built in 1944. (Carries No. 68013 "Royal Pioneer" (originally named Warrington). Previously No.WD150)

==== Stored ====
- GWR 5205 Class 2-8-0T No. 5224, built in 1924. Owned by Pete Waterman. Moved in 2015 from Crewe Heritage Centre and will be overhauled on site.
- GWR 5600 Class 0-6-2T No. 6634, built in 1928. Owned by Pete Waterman. Moved in 2017 from the Severn Valley Railway following its restoration from scrapyard condition never commencing, is due to be restored to working order.

=== Diesel locomotives ===
==== Operational - In Regular Use In Passenger Service ====
- BR 0-6-0DE Class 09 no. 09001. EWS Red. Built in 1959.
- BR 1Co-Co1 Class 44 no. D8 "Penyghent". BR Green. Built in 1959. In use regularly on passenger trains.

==== Operational - Not In Regualar Use In Passenger Service ====
- BR 0-4-0DM Class 01 no. D2953. BR Green. Built in 1956. (Heritage Shunters Trust owned)
- BR 0-4-0DH Class 02 no. D2854. BR Green. Built in 1960. (Heritage Shunters Trust owned)
- BR 0-6-0DM Class 03 no. 03099. BR Blue. Built in 1960. (Heritage Shunters Trust owned)
- BR 0-6-0DM Class 03 no. 03113. BR Blue. Built in 1960. (Heritage Shunters Trust owned)
- BR 0-6-0DM Class 03 no. D2139. BR Green. Built in 1960. (Heritage Shunters Trust owned)
- BR 0-6-0DM Class 04 no. D2284. BR Green. Built in 1960. (Heritage Shunters Trust owned)
- BR 0-6-0DE Class 07 no. 07001. BR Blue. Built in 1962.
- BR 0-6-0DE Class 08 no. 08016. BR Blue. Built in 1953.
- Thomas Hill Vanguard 4wDH "Cheedale" no. 284V. Built in 1979. Current Yard Shunting Locomotive.
- Many locomotives located at Andrew Briddon's yard at Darley Dale in varying condtions.

==== Undergoing overhaul/restoration ====
- Hudswell Clarke 0-6-0DM E1 'Castlefield' no. D1199. Built in 1960.
- BR 0-6-0DM Class 04 no. D2205. Built in 1953.
- BR 0-4-0DM Class 06 no. 06003. BR Blue. Built in 1959.
- BR 0-6-0DH Class 14 no. D9525. BR Green. Built in 1965.
- BR Co-Co Class 37 no. 37152. BR Railfreight livery. Built in 1963.
- BR Co-Co Class 50 no. 50030 Repulse BR large logo Blue. Built in 1968.
- Yorkshire Engine Co 0-6-0DH no. 2940 of 1965 "Libby"
- Many locomotives located at Andrew Briddon's yard at Darley Dale in varying condtions.

==== Stored ====
- BR 0-4-0DH Class 02 no. D2866. BR Blue. Built in 1961.
- BR 0-4-0DH Class 02 no. D2868. BR Green. Built in 1961.
- BR 0-6-0DM Class 03 no. 03027. BR Blue. Built in 1958.
- BR 0-6-0DM Class 03 no. 03180. BR Blue. Built in 1962.
- BR 0-6-0DM Class 03 no. D2199. BR Green. Built in 1961.
- BR 0-6-0DM Class 04 no. D2229. BR Black. Built in 1955.
- BR 0-6-0DM Class 04 no. D2272. BR Green. Built in 1958.
- BR 0-6-0DM Class 04 no. D2289. BR Green. Built in 1960.
- BR 0-6-0DM Class 04 no. D2337. BR Green. Built in 1956.
- BR 0-6-0DM Class 05 no. D2587. BR Green. Built in 1959.
- BR 0-6-0DE Class 08 no. D3000. BR Black. Built in 1952.
- BR 0-6-0DH Class 14 no. D9500. BR Green. Built in 1964.
- BR 1Co-Co1 Class 46 no. 46035 "Ixion". BR Blue. Built in 1962.
- BR Co-Co Class 50 no. 50029 Renown BR Large Logo Blue. Built in 1968.
- North British 0-6-0DH 27932 of 1959
- North British 0-4-0DH 27097 of 1953 (oldest s.g. diesel hydraulic in the UK)
- Brush Traction 0-6-0DE BT803 of 1979 (formerly with Tyne & Wear Metro and Channel Tunnel construction)
- Yorkshire 0-4-0DH (2679 of 1961)
- Many locomotives located at Andrew Briddon's yard at Darley Dale in varying condtions.

=== Diesel Multiple Units ===
==== Operational ====
- BR Class 108 nos. 51950 and 52062. Built 1959/1960.

==== Undergoing overhaul/restoration ====
N/A

== Former residents ==
=== Steam ===
Note that the locations given may not be current as locomotives move between railways from time to time.

- Hunslet 14" Saddle Tank 0-6-0ST Brookes No. 1 built in 1943. Now operational at the Middleton Railway.
- Hunslet Austerity 0-6-0ST No. 3883 built in 1944. (previous number WD 168 Lord Phil)
- GWR 4073 Class 4-6-0 no 7027 Thornbury Castle. Undergoing restoration from scrapyard condition at the Great Central Railway.
- LMS Stanier 8F Class 2-8-0 no 48624. Operational at the Great Central Railway, was originally painted in unauthentic LMS Crimson lake.
- GWR 4575 Class 2-6-2T No. 5553, built in 1928. Owned by Pete Waterman. Moved in 2015 from Crewe Heritage Centre. Returned to service December 2021.

=== Diesel ===
- MetroVick Co-Bo D5705, the sole remaining member of Class 28, was preserved from Swindon Works in 1980, stored at Darley Dale/Matlock Bath Goods Shed for many years before removal to Bury on the East Lancashire Railway by 1998 for completion.
- 25265 (7615) Harlech Castle used on passengers trains in the 1990s. Now at Nemesis Rail (stored).
- 31270 Athena used on passenger trains. Now at Didcot Rail Centre
- BR Bo-Bo Class 25 no. D7659. BR Two-Tone Green (Yellow Warning Panels). Built in 1966.

== See also ==
- Manchester, Buxton, Matlock and Midlands Junction Railway
- Monsal Trail
