= Rowsley South railway station =

Railway station in Darley Dale, England

Rowsley South
- Rowsley South Station in December 2007, looking northward

General information
- Location: Darley Dale, Derbyshire Dales; England
- Coordinates: 53.1746°N 1.6095°W
- System: Station on heritage railway
- Operator: Peak Rail
- Platforms: 1

History
- Opened: 1997
Location

Rowsley South railway station lies approximately 1 mile (1.6 km) short of Rowsley village, the location of the settlement's previous stations. Rowsley South was the third station to be built in the area, constructed by Peak Rail volunteers in the late 1990s.

Opened to passenger services in 1997, the station was for a time referred to as 'Northwood', which is the part of Rowsley settlement that is near to the terminus. This association can still be observed through the name of the café that stands on the station, which is known as the Northwood Buffet.

== History ==
The initial station in Rowsley was opened in 1849 and formed a terminus for the Manchester, Buxton, Matlock and Midlands Junction Railway line from Ambergate. That location became a goods yard in 1862, serving a new station built at that time, which lay on a through deviation. The latter took the line over the present day A6 road and the River Derwent, then into the Duke of Rutland's estate and on towards Bakewell. This later station in Rowsley closed in 1967 when the route itself was rationalised, prior to complete closure early in 1968.

== Present day ==
Rowsley South is now the main centre for the activities of preservation and heritage group Peak Rail and its various affiliated societies. The former operates a heritage steam service over some 3 1/2 miles (5.6 km) of the one-time London, Midland and Scottish Railway route to the south, with an intermediate station at Darley Dale a halt at Matlock Riverside and (since 2 July 2011) terminating at Matlock.

Built as it is by the site of Rowsley's former Goods Yard, the station has both good access and extensive space available for future developments. Part of the Goods Yard has been restored as sidings for locomotives and coaching stock, a number of which lead to the sheds that are operated by other societies.

Other tracks from the sidings lead to Peak Rail's locomotive shed, which is under construction, and also to a turntable (previously located at Mold Junction) which returned to full working order on 1 May 2010, being opened in a special ceremony by Pete Waterman.

The station is currently a single platform based on the Up side of the track and is Peak Rail's northern terminus. Peak Rail has secured a 99-year lease on the trackbed up to the A6 at Rowsley village for a proposed extension, which will involve rebuilding and full restoration of the former Rowsley railway station site itself. There are hopes of extending (via a proposed Haddon Halt) towards Bakewell in the future.

== Other societies ==
Other societies on the site include:

- London, Midland and Scottish Carriage Association
- Heritage Shunters Trust (South Yorkshire Railway Co Ltd)
- Renown and Repulse Preservation Group, who are currently restoring two Class 50 locomotives.

== Facilities ==
Facilities at the location include a Ticket Office (open many operating days), the 'Northwood Buffet' (open all operating days), and a shop (opening times as Buffet), along with disabled access toilets.

Parking at the station is both extensive and free of charge. Access to the station's facilities and to the yard is also without charge, though this only applies on operating days (on other occasions, the site is closed to the public). The LMSCA operate a small visitor centre inside their shed at the yard's southern end, and both they and the Heritage Shunters Trust welcome interested visitors. However, except in the case of such visits, the yard is closed to public access.

In 2008, Peak Rail was awarded £10,000 from the National Lottery's "Awards for All" scheme to upgrade facilities at the station itself, and this has since resulted in the construction of a new wooden station building, with new housing for a ticket office, shop and customer toilets, as well as rooms for stores and the stationmaster.

== Narrow gauge line ==
At the station's northern end is a small park and a play-area. There was previously also the narrow gauge line of the now-defunct Derbyshire Dales Narrow Gauge Railway.

| Preceding station | Heritage railways | Following station |
|---|---|---|
| Terminus | Peak Rail | Darley Dale towards Matlock |
Proposed extension
| Rowsley towards Bakewell | Peak Rail | Darley Dale towards Matlock |
