= Darley Dale railway station =

Heritage railway station in England

Darley Dale
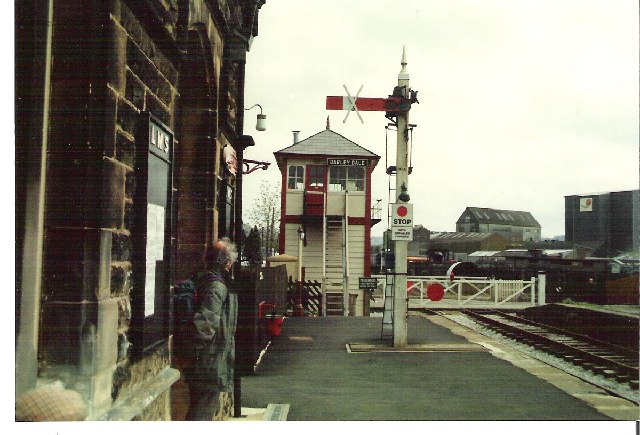
- Darley Dale Station, 1990s

General information
- Location: Darley Dale, Derbyshire Dales; England
- Coordinates: 53.1601°N 1.5937°W
- System: Station on heritage railway
- Operator: Peak Rail
- Platforms: 2

History
- Original company: Manchester, Buxton, Matlock and Midland Junction Railway
- Pre-grouping: Midland Railway
- Post-grouping: London, Midland and Scottish Railway

Key dates
- 4 June 1849: Opened as Darley
- 1 October 1890: Renamed Darley Dale
- 6 March 1967: Closed
- December 1991: Reopened in preservation
Location

Darley Dale railway station is a railway station on the heritage line Peak Rail.

== History ==
Lying at the bottom of Station Road in the settlement of Darley Dale, Darley Dale in its current form is not the first station to have existed upon the site. That halt was built in 1849, by the Manchester, Buxton, Matlock and Midlands Junction Railway, and existed on the other side of the level crossing. The present structure dates back to 1873, and at one time the station possessed both a footbridge and a goods yard.

The station survived into the British Rail era but succumbed to the round of closures that followed the Beeching Report of 1963, services ending on 6 March 1967. The line itself was then closed on 1 July 1968 and the track was subsequently removed. The station reopened in its current guise in 1991, as a result of the efforts of heritage and preservation group Peak Rail. Since then, the latter have run heritage steam services on the former London, Midland and Scottish Railway route to both Matlock and since 1997, to Rowsley South.

== Present day ==
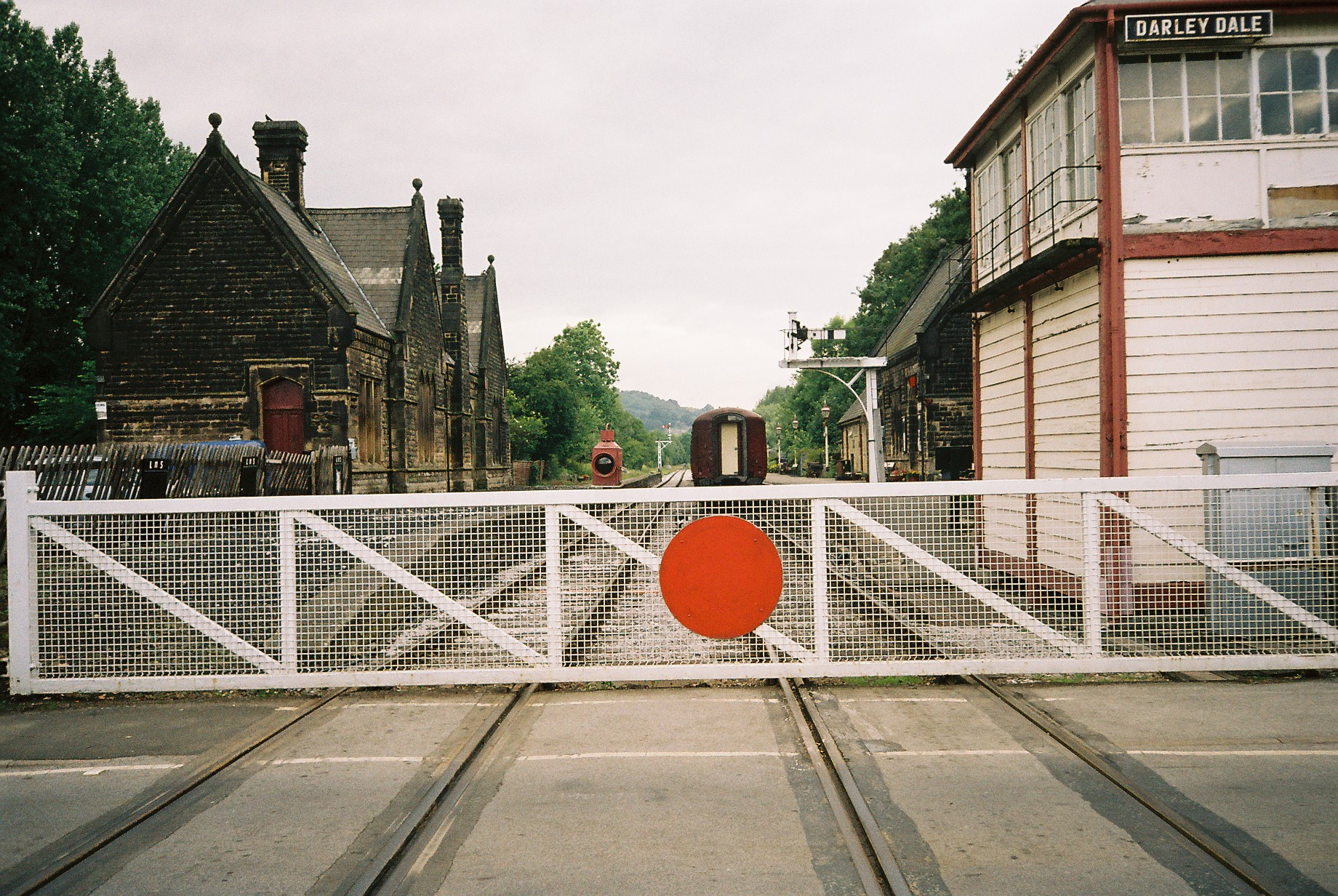
Darley Dale Station in June 2007, looking northward

Both platforms are now in use by Peak Rail. The station building on the Up platform contains an exhibition and waiting room, other facilities at the location include toilets with disabled access and parking for a small number of cars. Tickets must be purchased on the train however, as there is no longer a dedicated ticket office at this location.

In its latterday BR guise, the signal box was located on the south side of the level crossing (up side) and there was a lattice footbridge immediately north of the crossing. The signal box disappeared after closure and the footbridge was eventually removed for use on a heritage railway. Under Peak Rail auspices, a signal box (originally at Bamford but relocated from the erstwhile Buxton steam centre) was sited at the southern end of the Up platform (see pictures), with a level crossing (Station Road) just beyond it. This signal box was merely of cosmetic use, with the crossing controlled by a crossing keeper's hut at road level (located on the Down side, and across the road from the station). In March 2008, the crossing keeper's hut was replaced by a more extensive new structure built in a traditional style, required as part of the increased signalling equipment on the railway. The latter has, in effect, split the operation into three controlled sections, permitting better timetabling and more efficient services, while also providing the necessary infrastructure to cater for extensions to the present line. The raised signal box was dismantled on 14 January 2014, the upper half being removed for further use at Rowsley, the lower section being judged unfit for further use and dismantled. As the original footbridge has subsequently been re-acquired and returned, the plan is that it will take its old position in due course.

Darley Dale also possesses one small yard, at the south end of the station. Previously used to stable small amounts of rolling stock and locomotives, it has now been cleared pending a full-scale refurbishment of the life-expired facilities. In June 2013, agreement was reached for a locomotive maintenance/restoration building for the Andrew Briddon Loco collection to be built there, with foundations commencing in January 2014. The yard is not open to the public. Darley Dale also used to have a yard at the north end for the station, though this was completely removed over the 2012-2013 winter period.

Preceding station	Heritage railways	Following station
Rowsley South Terminus	Peak Rail	Matlock Terminus
Rowsley South Terminus	Peak Rail Special service only	Matlock Riverside Terminus
