= White Peak Loop Trail =

Recreational trail in the Peak District, England

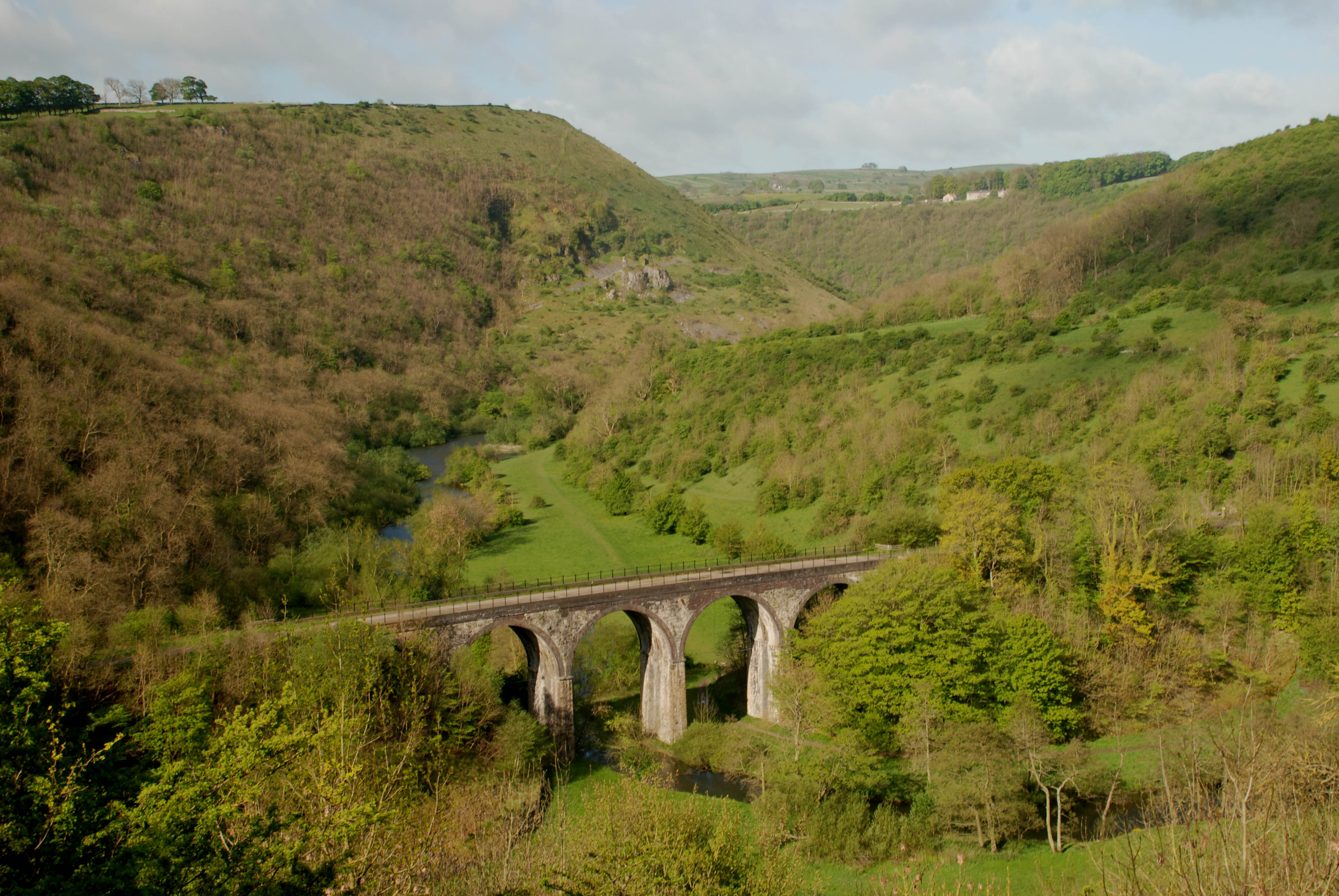
Monsal Trail over Monsal Head Viaduct

The White Peak Loop is a 42-mile (68 km) mostly offroad route for walking, cycling and horse riding in the Peak District of England. The trail combines sections of the High Peak Trail and the Monsal Trail with linking sections through the towns of Bakewell and Matlock. The White Peak Loop was developed by Derbyshire County Council and opened in 2025.

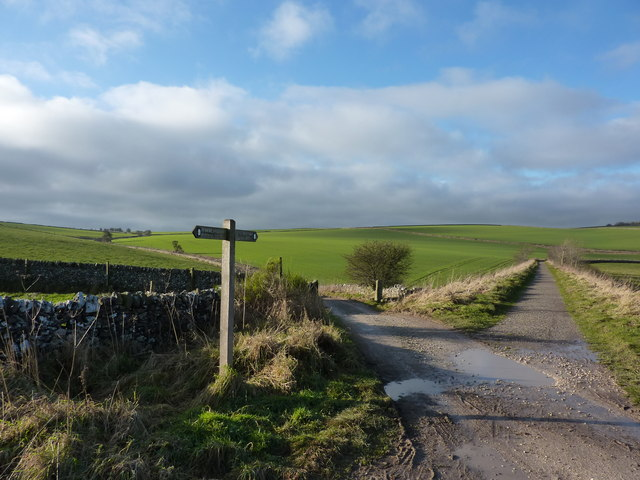
High Peak Trail

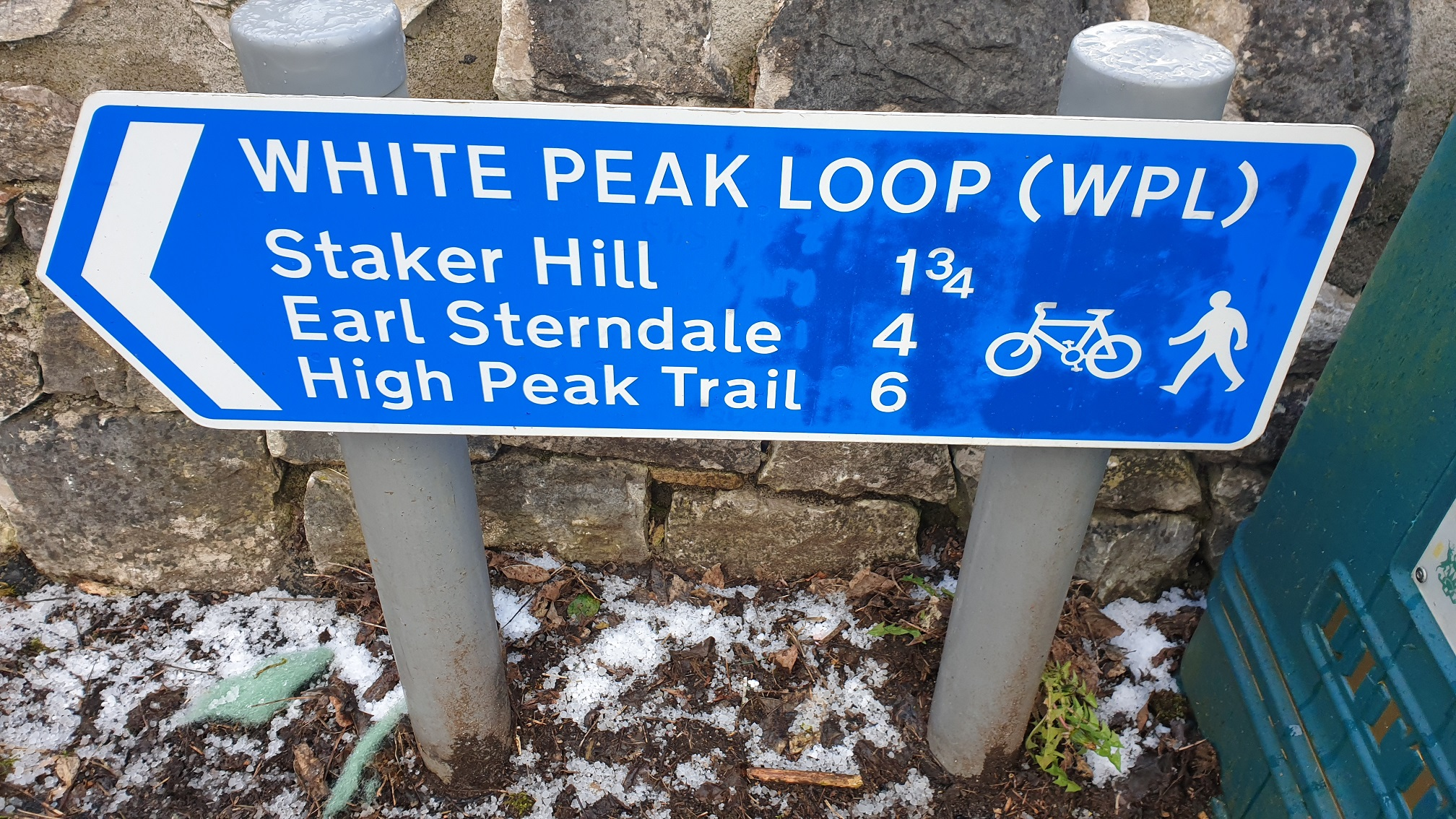
White Peak Loop trail sign at Harpur Hill

== Route ==
Sections clockwise from Matlock:

- Matlock to Cromford – 4 miles (6.4 km), A6 road then offroad
- High Peak Trail from Cromford to Dowlow – 17 miles (27 km), along the former Cromford and High Peak Railway line
- From Dowlow to Chee Dale – 4 miles (6.4 km), along country lanes
- Monsal Trail from Chee Dale to Bakewell – 8 miles (13 km), along the former Manchester, Buxton, Matlock and Midlands Junction Railway line, opened in 1981
- Bakewell to Rowsley – 4 miles (6.4 km) offroad track
- Rowsley to Matlock – 5 miles (8.0 km) offroad track following the line of the former Midland railway line, with a detour into Whitworth Park, opened in 2018

Harpur Hill spur towards Buxton:

- From Dowlow through Earl Sterndale and along Dale Head Road – 6 miles (9.7 km), quiet lanes
- From Dale Head Road over Staker Hill to Harpur Hill – 2 miles (3.2 km), offroad track completed in 2018

Planned extension:

- From the end of the Monsal Trail at Blackwell Mill, through Woo Dale to Buxton town centre and on to Harpur Hill

== Access ==
The High Peak Trail section links with the Tissington Trail, the Pennine Bridleway and the Midshires Way at Parsley Hay.

The White Peak Loop follows the Sustrans-sponsored National Cycle Route 54 from Cromford to Parsley Hay and National Cycle Route 68 from Parsley Hay to Buxton.

There are car parks on the High Peak Trail at Hurdlow, Parsley Hay, Friden, Minninglow, Middleton Top and Black Rocks.

There are car parks on the Monsal Trail at Bakewell, Hassop Station, Monsal Head, Tideswell Dale, Millers Dale and Wyedale.
