= Monsal Dale =

Valley in the Derbyshire Peak District

Coordinates: 53.24472°N 1.73172°W

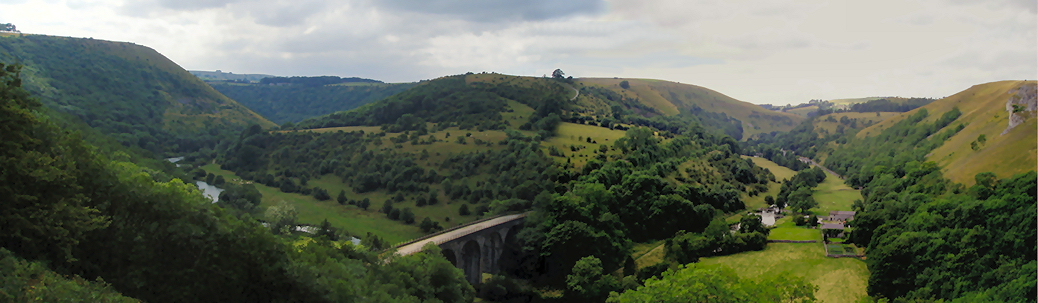
Panorama of Monsal Dale and the Headstone Viaduct

Monsal Dale is a valley in Derbyshire, England, in the White Peak limestone area of the Peak District National Park. It is a Site of Special Scientific Interest (SSSI), a Special Area of Conservation (SAC) (1) and part of a Europe-wide network called Natura 2000. Monsal Dale is also the venue for Monsal Hill Climb.

== Headstone Viaduct ==
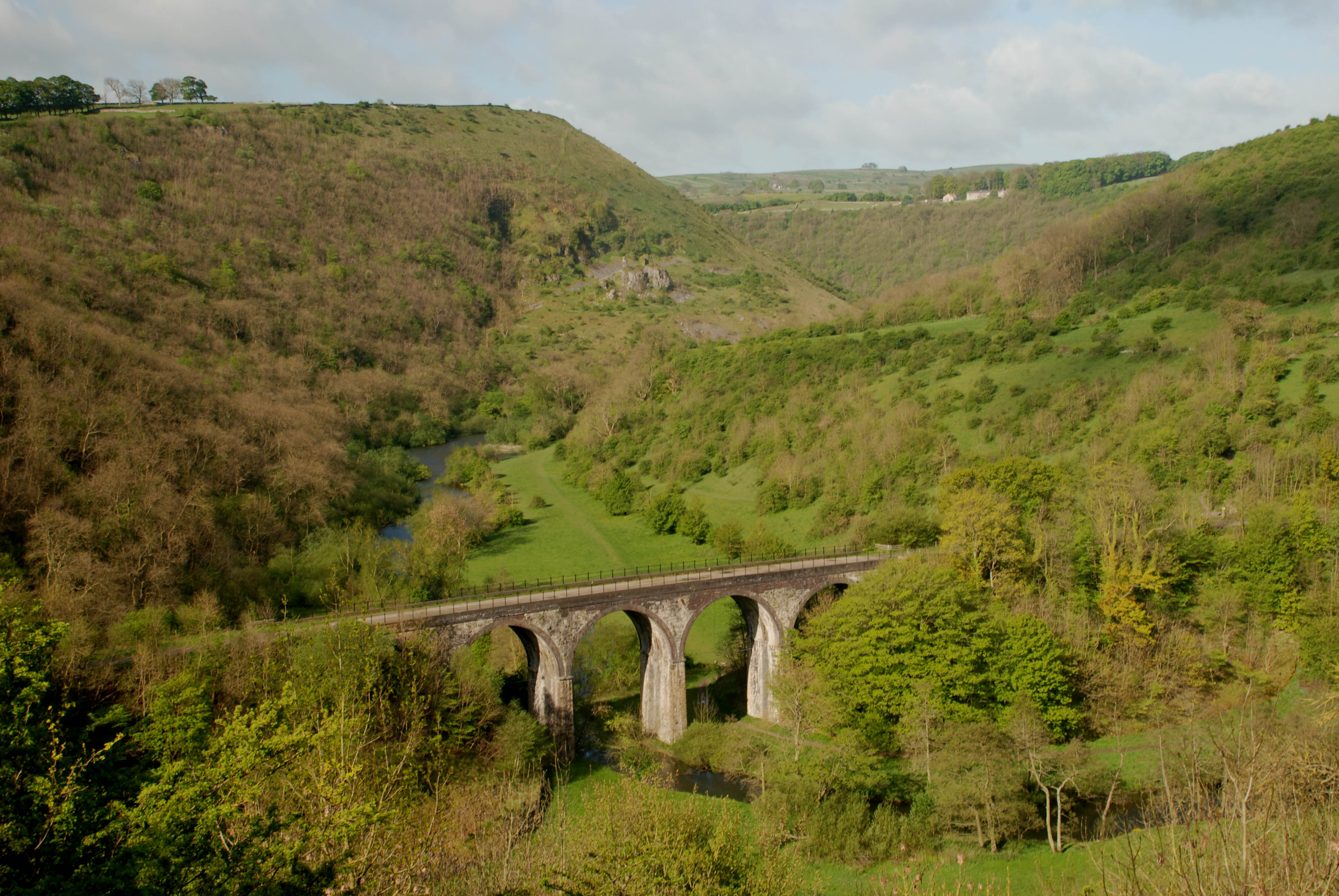
Headstone Viaduct

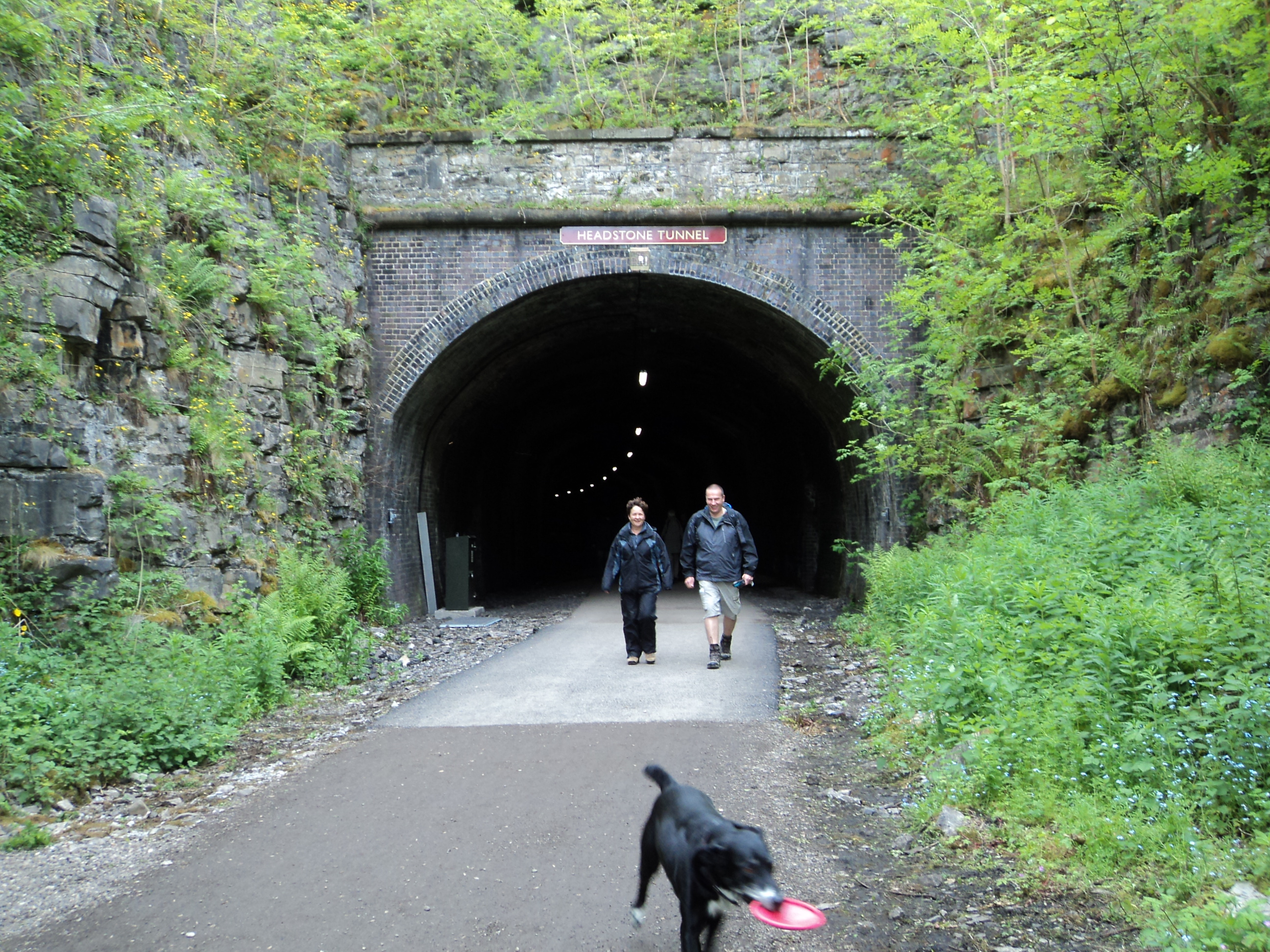
Headstone Tunnel, at the southern end of the viaduct, was opened to the public in May 2011

The Headstone Viaduct was built by the Midland Railway over the River Wye. The bridge, which stands near the 533-yard (487 m) Headstone Tunnel, is 300 feet (91 m) long. It had five 50-foot (15 m) span arches, some 70 feet (21 m) high at the centre. Initially, some slippage occurred, and remedial work was carried out in 1907–08.

Whilst considered elegant today, with Grade II listed status being assigned to it in 1970, when it was built in 1863 it was seen as destroying the beauty of the dale. John Ruskin, considered to be Britain's leading cultural critic, harshly criticised the building of the railway:

There was a rocky valley between Buxton and Bakewell, once upon a time, divine as the Vale of Tempe... You Enterprised a Railroad through the valley – you blasted its rocks away, heaped thousands of tons of shale into its lovely stream. The valley is gone, and the Gods with it; and now, every fool in Buxton can be in Bakewell in half an hour, and every fool in Bakewell at Buxton; which you think a lucrative process of exchange – you Fools everywhere.

— Fors Clavigera: Letters to the Workmen and Labourers of Great Britain

A proposal that never came to fruition was for another viaduct for the Lancashire, Derbyshire and East Coast Railway to cross both the valley and the Midland Line, some three hundred feet high.

== Monsal Trail ==
The viaduct is now part of the Monsal Trail. Headstone Tunnel, at the southern end of the viaduct, was re-opened to the public in May 2011, along with nearby Cressbrook and Litton Tunnels.

Monsal Dale railway station

Monsal Dale railway station opened in 1866 to serve the villages of Upperdale and Cressbrook, with the latter's cotton mills. The down line and platform was built on a shelf carved in the rock face, while the up was built on wooden trestles over the hillside. It closed in 1959 and nothing remains of the timber buildings.

From Monsal Dale, the line proceeded through Cressbrook (471 yards) and Litton (515 yards) tunnels to Millers Dale on its way north. Cut through solid limestone, they were both complex tunnels, on a gradient of 1 in 100, and curved to allow the line to conform to the terrain.

== See also ==
- List of bridges in the United Kingdom
- Manchester, Buxton, Matlock and Midlands Junction Railway
- Monsal Trail
- Listed buildings in Little Longstone
