= Blackwell in the Peak =

Village in Derbyshire, England

Coordinates: 53.245°N 1.813°W

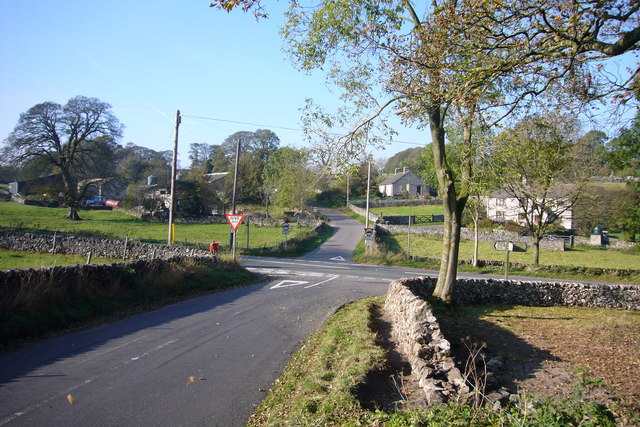
- Crossroads to Blackwell.

- Blackwell in the Peak parish highlighted within Derbyshire
- OS grid reference: SK125721
- Civil parish: Blackwell in the Peak
- District: Derbyshire Dales
- Shire county: Derbyshire
- Region: East Midlands
- Country: England
- Sovereign state: United Kingdom
- Post town: BUXTON
- Postcode district: SK17
- Police: Derbyshire
- Fire: Derbyshire
- Ambulance: East Midlands

Blackwell is a village in the Derbyshire Dales local government district of Derbyshire, England, on the A6 main road between Bakewell and Buxton.

It is sometimes referred to as "Blackwell-in-the-Peak" to distinguish it from Blackwell near Alfreton.

It lies on the River Wye on the edge of the carboniferous limestone of the White Peak. Nearby is Blackwell Hall in the grounds of which have been found neolithic remains, including a flint resharpening flake for tranchet axes. There are also the remnants of a Romano-British field system, dating from around the year 400. The name is said to derive from the Norman Blacheuuelle or King's land.

About a mile (1.6 km) to the north west is Blackwell Mill, with the remains of the Midland Railway line from Millers Dale.
