= Blackwell Mill =

Former railway station in Derbyshire, England

Coordinates: 53.25030°N 1.83360°W

Blackwell Mill Halt
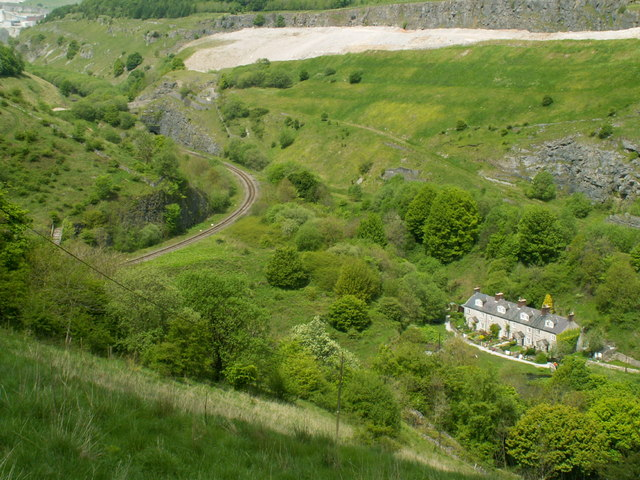
- Cottages at Blackwell Mill, near to the remaining north curve of the junction

General information
- Location: High Peak; England
- Grid reference: SK112726
- Platforms: 2

Other information
- Status: Disused

History
- Original company: Midland Railway
- Post-grouping: London, Midland and Scottish Railway

Key dates
- 1 November 1874: Station opened
- June 1966: last train called
- 6 March 1967: Station officially closed

Blackwell Mill is a location in Derbyshire, England; it lies near to, but not part of, the village of Blackwell near Buxton. It stands at the meeting point of several valleys: Great Rocks Dale, Chee Dale and Ashford Dale. A railway station was sited here by the Midland Railway; it operated for 92 years.

== History ==
There was once a corn mill on the River Wye which may have dated from at least 1066. Most of it has disappeared, apart from the weir; the remains are marked as an Ancient Monument.

In times past, the Manchester Turnpike forded the river.

== Railway ==
The Midland Railway main line from London St Pancras to Manchester London Road passed through Blackwell Mill. It was opened as part of the Manchester, Buxton, Matlock and Midlands Junction Railway. This point was the south curve of the triangular junction which it built when it, instead, extended to New Mills.

There was a railway station variously called Blackwell Mill or Blackwell Mill Halt. Long enough only for one carriage, for many years it was the smallest passenger station on British Railways. It consisted of two short platforms, with no buildings, apart from a small shelter. The station was last used in June 1966 and officially closed in 1967. The halt was for the railway workers who lived in the eight still-occupied terraced cottages nearby in the valley.

The station was included in a Pathé News film in 1938.

The branch carried on into Buxton along Wye Dale, crossing the main A6 road and the river by a high twin-arched girder bridge, before entering Pig Tor Tunnel (191 yards), where it emerged into Ashwood Dale, followed by the 100-yard (91 m) Ashwood Dale Tunnel.

Passengers and goods from Buxton (Midland) wishing to transfer to or from the Midland Railway travelled past this point, then change trains at Millers Dale.

In 2024 although now derelict, the building and platforms are still standing.

== Route ==
Preceding station	Disused railways	Following station
Buxton (Midland)	Midland Railway; Manchester, Buxton, Matlock and Midland Junction Railway	Millers Dale

== The site today ==
Today, Blackwell Mill marks the northern end of the Monsal Trail, a shared-use path from Bakewell, which follows the former trackbed of the Midland Railway.

== See also ==
- Monsal Trail
- List of Tunnels in the United Kingdom
