= Haddon Tunnel =

Railway tunnel in Derbyshire, England

Coordinates: 53.19482°N 1.64915°W

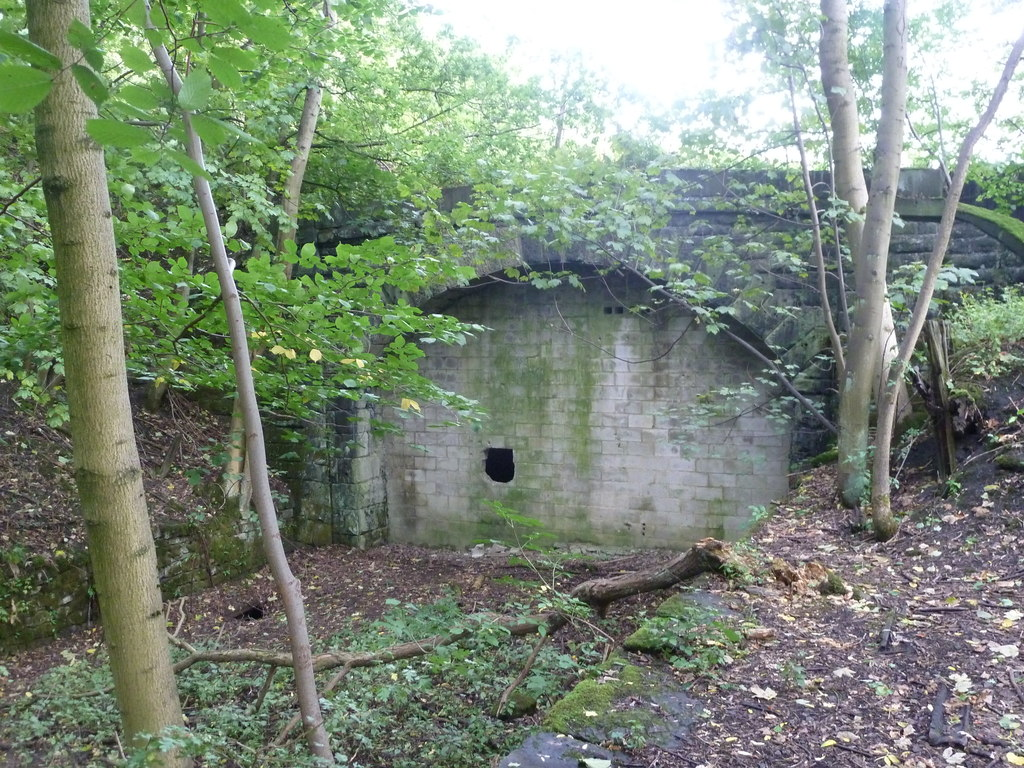
Haddon Tunnel entrance

Haddon Tunnel was built by the Midland Railway in 1863 when extending the Manchester, Buxton, Matlock and Midlands Junction Railway from Rowsley to Buxton in Derbyshire, England.

The tunnel was constructed to hide the railway from the view of the Duke of Rutland where the line passed Haddon Hall. The tunnel rises towards Bakewell on a gradient of 1:102, is 1,058 yards (967 m) long and was mostly built by the cut and cover method. It was built with five ventilation shafts, one was the full width of the double-track tunnel, the deepest was 12 feet (3.7 m). It was on the Midland Railway's (later London, Midland and Scottish Railway) main line between London and Manchester. The line was closed in 1968 but the tunnel survives; Peak Rail has plans to reopen the line and tunnel on its intended extension to Bakewell.

== History ==
=== Construction ===
In the 1860s, the Midland Railway built its Buxton branch line through the Peak District; the route crossed the Haddon Hall estate which was owned by Charles Manners, 6th Duke of Rutland. To minimise the impact of the railway on the estate and political opposition to the line, the company built tunnels to hide the line. Plans for the tunnel signed by the Midland's Chief Engineer William Henry Barlow, contractor George Thomson, and his brother Peter, depict this section of line as having two separate tunnels, the southern 120 yards long and the northern roughly 900 yards long, separated by a cutting.

On 10 September 1860, ground was broken and work commenced on a shaft close to the main tunnel's midpoint from which a heading was driven. In April 1861, work started at two points in the heading to excavate the tunnel to size; progress was made in lengths of 12 feet, each of which required around 30 pit props of varying dimensions. The tunnel was built in three sections; from the south portal, a cut-and-cover-built portion of roughly 490 yards, a 350-yard tunnel, and another covered segment of 220 yards. For the cut-and-cover sections, once excavated to the correct depth, side walls and arches were built before being backfilled. As a consequence of shallow fill and the gradient of the slope, the ground was unable to counteract the thrust of the arch, which necessitated buttresses to provide sufficient support for the west wall.

Changes to the plans led to a substantially different structure being built despite the convention that dictated engineering contracts required the work to be carried out in accordance with what was designed. Such differences are not uncommon when building tunnels because of unforeseen obstacles that were encountered. The cutting was abandoned and the pair of tunnels were joined except for an open box section, 11 yards long, that provided daylight and some ventilation. Five ventilation shafts were also sunk. On 12 December 1861, John S Allen presented a paper on the tunnel's construction to the Civil & Mechanical Engineers' Society, which attributes the composition of the ground, largely shale, limestone, and clay. The clay caused several land slides, playing a major role in the need for alterations.

A single major accident occurred during the tunnel's construction. On 2 July 1861, a partially built 36-foot length of arch in the northern section collapsed while waiting to be keyed with additional stonework. The arch, supported by eight ribs, each fitted with props at both ends and another in the middle, steadied by three rakers held the arch in place but it collapsed without warning, burying several workers. Rescue efforts commenced immediately and the victims were extracted within two hours. Five workers were killed, four outright and another that died the following day. There is a memorial to the casualties in the churchyard of St Katherine's Church, Rowsley. The system had been used in the construction of four other lengths. Having reviewed accounts, Barlow suspected that the cause of the collapse was the suspected loss of a single prop, which may have led to the arch's weight twisting on the central raker before giving way. The railway paid £100 (equivalent to £10,863 in 2025) compensation to each of the dead men's families.

=== Operation ===
In January 1862, Haddon Tunnel had been officially completed and buried beneath the estate within 16 months. On 1 August 1862, the first public train passed through running to a temporary terminus at Hassop about three miles away. In May 1863, the line reached Buxton.

By the start of the 20th century, inspections of the No.3 ventilation shaft detected movement of around 1 and a half inches at one side of the brick arch and other difficulties such as the accumulation of smoke due to increased traffic levels. During July 1900, the Chief Engineer's office at Derby planned corrective measures which involved the removing the shaft and 33 feet of arch around it to construct an open box to provide better ventilation. Later that year, work commenced that took eleven months during which passenger trains incurred no delays. Some difficulty was experienced removing the crown, but the work proceeded straightforwardly despite its intrusive nature. The cost was £2,904 against the estimate of £2,000.

In 1964, in the Beeching cuts that saw large swathes of Britain's railways closed, a study was published on duplicated trans-Pennine routes and the introduction of electric traction for Manchester-Euston services on the West Coast Main Line, which launched in April 1966. As a result of these changes, from October 1966, freight traffic was instead diverted via the Hope Valley Line and it was anticipated that passenger express services were to be withdrawn. On 29 June 1968, 1H18, running from St Pancras to Manchester Piccadilly, became the last train to traverse Haddon Tunnel. The line was closed in 1968 by Labour Minister of Transport Barbara Castle, but the tunnel survives.

=== Closure and future ===
After the line closed the infrastructure was dismantled. The disused tunnel and adjacent trackbed were reincorporated into the Haddon Estate. The tunnel was bricked up and not maintained for over 40 years but has survived largely unscathed, and a prospective reopening is a realistic proposition. A campaign championed by Peak Rail and others culminated in a feasibility study into its reinstatement by Derbyshire County Council in 2004. The Haddon Estate is opposed to such plans.

Peak Rail maintains its plans to extend its heritage rail services via both Rowsley railway station and a proposed Haddon Halt towards Bakewell. Fulfilling this ambition would require more work than restoring the tunnel, most significantly reinstatement of a demolished bridge over the A6 road at Rowsley.

It is likely that the tunnel could be opened to pedestrians and cyclists in a plan to extend the Monsal Trail.
