= Monsal Hill Climb =

British hillclimb event

Race details
- Region: Derbyshire
- Discipline: Hillclimbing (cycling)
- Organiser: Marc Etches
- Web site: www.monsalhillclimb.com

History (men)
- First edition: 1930
- Editions: 96
- Final edition: 2026
- First winner: C Newell (GBR)
- Most wins: R Wilson (GBR) L H Dodd (GBR) (5 wins)
- Final winner: Gabe Dellar (GBR)

History (women)
- First edition: 2010
- Editions: 16
- First winner: Diane Lee (GBR)
- Most wins: Jessie Walker (GBR) (4 wins)
- Final winner: Rachel Galler (GBR)

The Monsal Hill Climb is a Hillclimbing (cycling) competition in Monsal Dale which takes place annually in October. The event first ran in 1930 and continues to this day running every year except for 2020 due to the COVID-19 pandemic. Since 2010 the event has incorporated a women's event. The modern day event is governed by Cycling Time Trials and promoted by Sheffrec Cycling Club.

The event is well known for its history and course record of 1 minute 14.2 seconds, set by Malcolm Elliott in 1981. The men's record is the longest-standing in British hill climbing history. The current women's record is held by Bithja Jones with a time of 1 minute 37.5 seconds set in 2021.

== History ==
=== Early history (1930-1979) ===
Even prior to the inaugural round of the Monsal Hill climb used in the course was popular with cyclists as early at the 1920's. Little is known about the early editions of the race, as it began as an informal competition between friends. This event was first started at the end of the track season with friends timing each other up the hill, at this time it was an unmade road. The inaugural event took place in 1930 and was won by C. Newell of Sheffield Phoenix CC in 1 minute 51 seconds. This record fell several times over the following years. In 1946 came L H Dodd riding for Sheffield Phoenix CC with a time of 1 minute 24.3 seconds, an improvement on his 1941 record and win. Dodd's 2nd record setting win was his 5th win at this event, having previously won in 1940-1943, the greatest number of wins by a single rider to the modern day. Dodd's record stood until Tom Simpson, riding for Scala Wheelers would win the event in 1957 clocking a time of 1 minute 23.4 seconds. Tom's record went on to stand for 23 years and is still remembered to this day, given the 19-year old was already an Olympic medalist and went on to ride the 1960 Tour de France 3 years later.

Dave Gretton won the Monsal Hill Climb race in 1972 and 1973. In this recording, taken at the 2026 edition of the race, he recounts his first experiences at the race in 1962 and highlights the tactics and equipment used.

Later in the 1960's R Wilson of Birdwell Wheelers would have a good run at the event, winning 5 editions in a row, from 1967 until 1971, matching Dodd's previous greatest number of wins.

=== Malcolm Elliot Record (1980-1981) ===
In 1980 Malcolm Elliott would become the first rider to break Tom Simpson's 1957 record. Malcolm, who was riding for Rutland CC set a time of 1 minute 20.6 seconds, 2.8 faster than Tom. The subsequent year Malcolm returned for more, setting a faster time of 1 minute 14.2 seconds.

The record stands to this day making it the record is the longest-standing in British hill climbing history. The longevity of the record has helped to elevate the popularity of the event with many modern competitors striving for the record. Historical analysis shows Malcolm had a slight tail wind when setting his record.

=== Development Years (1982-2009) ===
For the 60th Edition of the race in 1990, Malcolm Elliot would return to present the podium prizes. In the years following Malcolm Elliott record many established professional cyclists attempted to beat Malcolm's record but it wasn't until 2003 that someone would ride a sub-1 minute 20 seconds ride, where Russell Downing won with a 1 minute 18.3 seconds, riding for Life Repair. Russell went on to another respectable time of 1 minute 19.1 seconds in 2007. During this period riders like Russel, but also Dean Downing were in regular attendance at the race. In 2009 the event was taken over by current organiser Marc Etches and ran with closed roads for the first time. Marc is the 4th organiser in the events history following on from Ike Delbridge who organised the first 25 years. Albert Thorpe then took over for the following 27 years before handing the event on to his son David who promoted the next 14 years

=== Modern Day Race (2010-present) ===
Since 2010 the race incorporated a Women's event, as well as Veteran's and Junior categories. The 2010 edition attracted 120 riders including previous winner Russell Downing, who now road for Team Sky. Russel went onto win, but impacted by a slight head wind, could only manage a 1 minute 20.5 seconds. The first female result was recorded in 2010 by Diane Lee of Zepnat RC with a 1 minute 56.8 seconds.

The event in 2011 saw Junior Jessie Walker of RST RT Trigon 1 minute 55.8 seconds, a new course record. Gunnar Gronlund also of RST RT Trigon won the Mens category with a 1 minute 26.0 seconds. The following year in 2012 Jessie retained her victory with a faster 1 minute 53.5 seconds, now riding for Matrix Fitness – Prendas. Lancashire rider Jack Pullar set a much faster time than recent years with a 1 minute 18.9 seconds, ahead of previous winner Gunnar and Russel. The following year Jack and Jessie retained their victories with times of 1 minute 19.9 seconds and 1 minute 54.7 seconds respectively. Crowds at the 2013 had swelled to approximately 700 spectators, requiring the organisers to barrier the final 50 yards of the climb. 2014 saw Jessie take her fourth victory in a row, cementing herself as the most victorious rider in the women's category, whilst Graham Briggs took his first win at Monsal Hill Climb with a time of 1 minute 20.5 seconds.

Lane from Cressbrook approaching Monsal Head, which makes up the final 50m for the Monsal Hill Climb

In 2015, Joe Clark won with a time of 1 minute 20.1 seconds ahead of Adam Kenway, while Lou Bates won the women's race in 1 minute 55.1 seconds, setting a new women's record. She finished 2 seconds ahead of Jessie Walker in second place. Adam Kenway wound better Joe to win the following years round in 2016, fist pumping the air, having set a time of 1 minute 16.5 seconds. This was the closest anyone had come to beating Malcolm Elliot's record. The women's record did fall, however, with Lou Bates now of Veloschils Interbike RT setting a 1 minute 42.8 seconds. A record number of entries where seen in 2017, with 190 riders listed to take the start. Kenway, now riding for Team Raleigh, would retain his title in 2017 with a marginally slower time of 1 minute 19.4 seconds. Rebecca Goodson won the womens with a 1 minute 47.8 seconds, set in slower conditions.

Calum Brown won in 2018, been the first rider to come within 0.3 seconds of Malcolms record, recording a time of 1 minute 14.5 seconds. Around that time Calum Brown was reported to be capable of producing over 1000 watts for 60 seconds. That same year Emilie Verroken of Maxx R. T. LV won recording a 1 minute 56.3 seconds. Calum Brown and Rebecca Richards would win in 2019, slightly off record setting pace. The same event was Russell Downing last race.

The COVID-19 pandemic would result in the cancelation of the 2020 event. Instead the event announced an informal "Strava Segment Challenge", where competitors had the month of October to set a time across the virtual segment.

In 2021, reigning national hill climb champion Bithja Jones set a women's new course record with a time of 1 minute 37.5 seconds. Meanwhile, Andy Nichols riding for Team Lifting Gear Products/Cycles In Motion won the men’s event in 1 minute 19.5 seconds. The following year Bithja Jones would win again with a slight time of 1 minute 39.9 seconds, whilst Greg Booker road to the win on a borrowed bike from his farther, in a 1 minute 19.4 seconds. From 2023-2025 Andy Nichols would claim his 2nd, 3rd and 4th victory at Monsal, missing out slightly on the personal record he set during is first win in 2021. During this time Abi Plowman won in 2023 and Rachel Galler won in 2024 and 2025, coming close to Bithja Jones' record with a 1 minute 39.8 seconds ride in 2025.

In 2026 Rachel Galler won for a 3rd time with her closes attempt at the record yet posting a time of 1 minute 37.9 seconds, just 0.4 seconds off the mark. Whilst 25-year old Gabe Dellar riding for Ride Revolution set a 1 minute 16.7 seconds time.

== The course ==
The Monsal Hill Climb route used for the majority of the history of the event

The Monsal Hill Climb uses the same 0.6km (675 yard) stretch of unclassified road in Monsal Dale, Peak District each year. The climb runs parallel to the River Wye and reaches gradients of up to 21% with an average of 9%, climbing approximately 50 metres. The official start is close to a signpost at the base. The course begins relatively flat before ramping up in gradient, requiring catchers for some competitors at the summit. The climb is considered suitable for a Fixed-gear bicycle. The climb is listed as number 30 in Simon Warren's book 100 Greatest Cycling Climbs.

The wartime 1942 edition took place on Siggate, a steep rural road east of Castleton, Derbyshire, the only round not to take place at the typical venue.

Course Records
Classification	Rider	Club	Time	Year
Open	Malcolm Elliott	Rutland CC	1:14.2	1981
Women	Bithja Jones	Pankhurst Cycles	1:37.5	2021
