= Bakewell railway station =

Disused railway station in Derbyshire, England

Bakewell
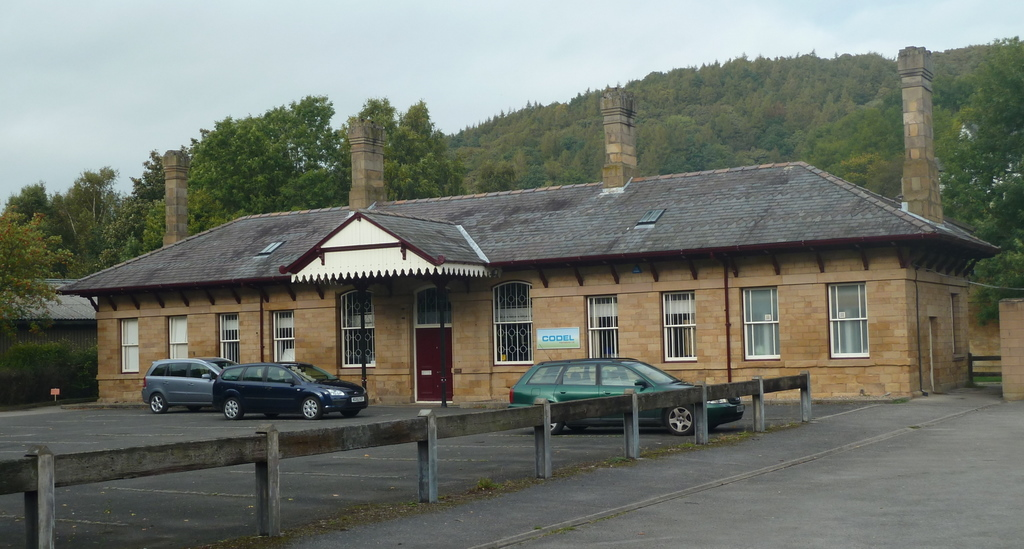
- The station building

General information
- Location: Bakewell, Derbyshire Dales, England
- Coordinates: 53.2177°N 1.6689°W
- Platforms: 2

Other information
- Status: Disused

History
- Original company: Midland Railway
- Pre-grouping: Midland Railway
- Post-grouping: London Midland and Scottish Railway

Key dates
- 1 August 1862: Station opened
- 6 March 1967: Station closed

Listed Building – Grade II
- Feature: Former Bakewell railway station
- Designated: 28 January 1994
- Reference no.: 1316505
Location

Bakewell railway station served the town of Bakewell, in Derbyshire, England, between 1862 and 1967. It was built by the Midland Railway on its extension of the Manchester, Buxton, Matlock and Midland Junction Railway line from Rowsley to Buxton Midland. The Peak Rail heritage railway intends to reopen the station to trains by extending its existing Matlock to Rowsley South line by 4 miles (6.4 km) through Rowsley to Bakewell.

== History ==
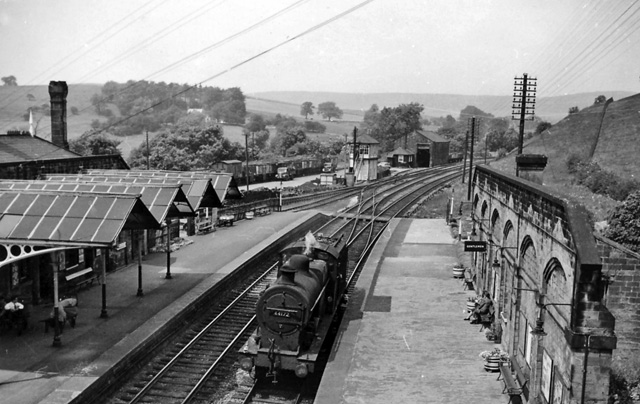
View northward in 1961

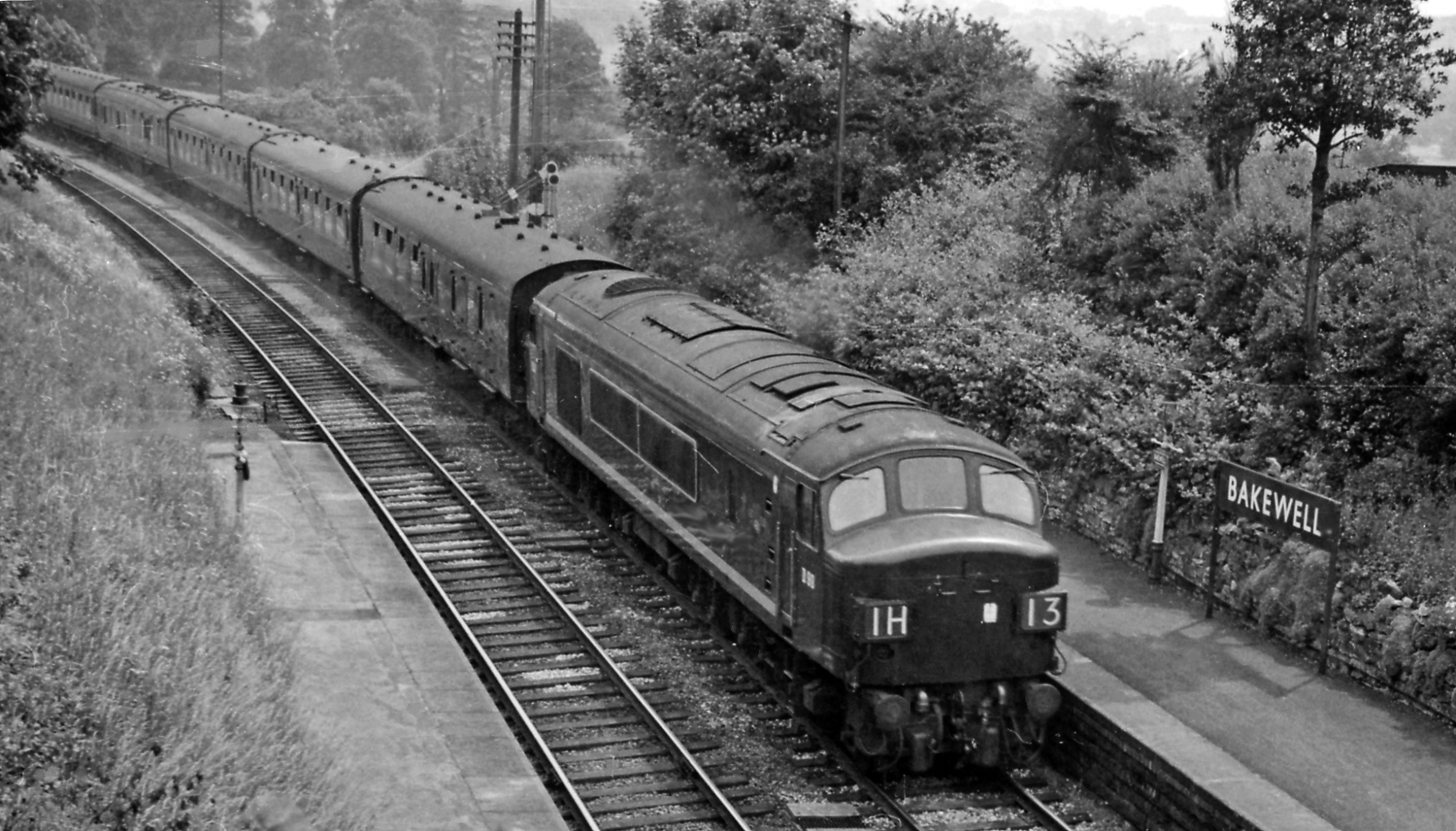
Diesel-hauled down express in 1961

The station was opened by the Midland Railway on 1 August 1862. Being the nearest station to Haddon Hall, it was built in a grand style as the local station for the Duke of Rutland over whose land the line had passed. Designed by Edward Walters of Manchester, the buildings were of fine ashlar with intricate carvings which incorporated the duke's coat of arms.

Since the line climbed steeply towards its summit at Peak Forest, the station was located uphill about 1/2 mile (0.8 km) from the town, which became a disadvantage when road transport developed.

It was used most frequently during the Bakewell Show, but the station was also popular with campers and tourists. The station was host to a London, Midland and Scottish Railway camping coach from 1935 to 1939; one was also positioned here by the London Midland Region from 1954 to 1967.

Following the Grouping of all lines into four main companies in 1923, the station became part of the London, Midland and Scottish Railway.

During the nationalisation of Britain's railways in 1948, the station was passed on to the London Midland Region of British Railways and, despite escaping the Beeching Axe, the station was closed when passenger services ceased on 6 March 1967. Trains continued to pass through the station until 1968, when the line was closed.

Disused railways
Hassop; Line and station closed	Midland Railway; Manchester, Buxton, Matlock and Midland Junction Railway	Rowsley; Line and station closed
Preceding station	Heritage railways	Following station
Proposed extension
Terminus	Peak Rail	Rowsley towards Matlock

== The site today ==
The station buildings still survive and are Grade II listed. They are sited 1/2 mile (0.8 km) east of the centre of Bakewell, high upon the hillside due to the alignment that the railway was forced to take.

The main building is now used by an electronics company, which has retained many of the station's original features; the goods shed is now part of an industrial estate. The gap between the platforms has been filled in, as the Monsal Trail shared-use path now passes through the site along the former trackbed. The ridged canopies over platform 1, the goods shed and cattle dock have all since been removed.

== See also ==
- Listed buildings in Bakewell
