= Monsal Dale railway station =

Former railway station in Derbyshire, England

Monsal Dale
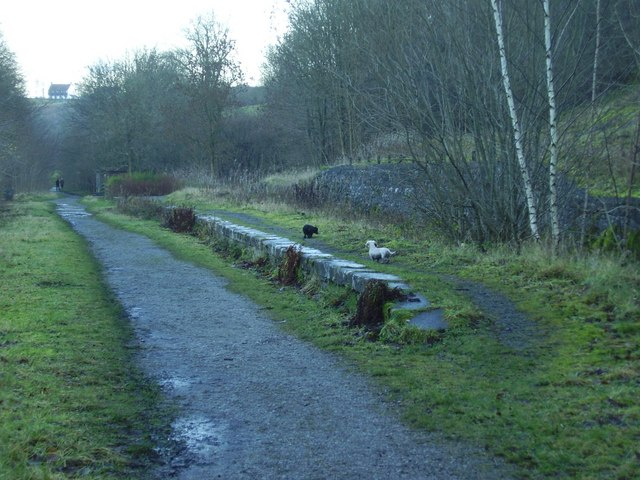
- The station's remains in 2006

General information
- Location: Derbyshire Dales; England
- Coordinates: 53.2445°N 1.7357°W
- Platforms: 2

Other information
- Status: Disused

History
- Pre-grouping: Midland Railway
- Post-grouping: London, Midland and Scottish Railway

Key dates
- 1 September 1866: Opened
- 10 August 1959: Closed to regular services
- 3 April 1961: Closed completely
Location

Monsal Dale railway station served the villages of Upperdale and Cressbrook in Derbyshire, England. It was opened in 1866 by the Midland Railway on its line from Rowsley, extending the Manchester, Buxton, Matlock and Midlands Junction Railway.

== History ==
The original intention was merely to have a goods depot to serve the nearby Cressbrook Mill, to be called Cressbrook or Cressbrook Sidings; however, a passenger station would also serve the villages of Upperdale and Cressbrook.

The down line and platform was built on a shelf carved in the rock face, while the up was built on wooden trestles over the hillside. The wooden buildings for the latter were obtained from Evesham railway station.

From Monsal Dale, the line proceeded through Cressbrook 471 yards (431 m) and Litton 515 yards (471 m) tunnels to Millers Dale on its way north. Cut through solid limestone, they were both complex tunnels on a gradient of 1 in 100 and curved to allow the line to conform to the terrain.

It was written:

There is not in the whole range of Peak scenery such a lovely landscape in so small a space as can be viewed from the platform of this singular and romantically situated station.

The station closed to regular passenger traffic in 1959 but continued to be used by occasional ramblers' specials and excursions until April 1961; trains continued to pass through the station until 1968 when the line was closed.

=== Stationmasters ===
- James Lister ca. 1867
- Richard Coe ca. 1871–1873 (afterwards station master at Longstone)
- J. Freer 1874
- J. Hudston 1874–1876 (afterwards station master at Chapel-en-le-Frith)
- G. Barnett 1876–1880 (afterwards station master at Chorlton-cum-Hardy)
- W. Daw 1880–1881 (afterwards station master at Warmley)
- Richard Foskett 1881–1884 (afterwards station master at Blackwell)
- William James 1884–1904 (afterwards station master at Tanhouse Lane, Widnes)
- A.W. Jepson 1904–1906
- J. Greenbank from 1906
- H.R. Wilcox until 1909 (afterwards station master at Bugsworth)
- Joseph Jennings 1909–ca. 1911
- D.H. Jones ca. 1914
- Mr. Tompkins ca. 1932
- J.H. Adams 1944–1947 (afterwards station master at Radway Green)

From 1 October 1931, the stationmastership was merged with that of Longstone.

== Route ==
Preceding station	Disused railways	Following station
Millers Dale; Line and station closed	Midland Railway; Manchester, Buxton, Matlock and Midland Junction Railway	Longstone; Line and station closed

== The site today ==
This section of line forms part of the Monsal Trail, an 8.5-mile (13.7 km)-long shared-use path. The down platform edge can still be seen, but nothing remains of the up platform or timber buildings. The tunnels previously mentioned were reopened in 2011; the path diversions over the river via a permissive path by Cressbrook Mill are still available.
