= Great Longstone for Ashford railway station =

Former railway station in Derbyshire, England

Great Longstone for Ashford
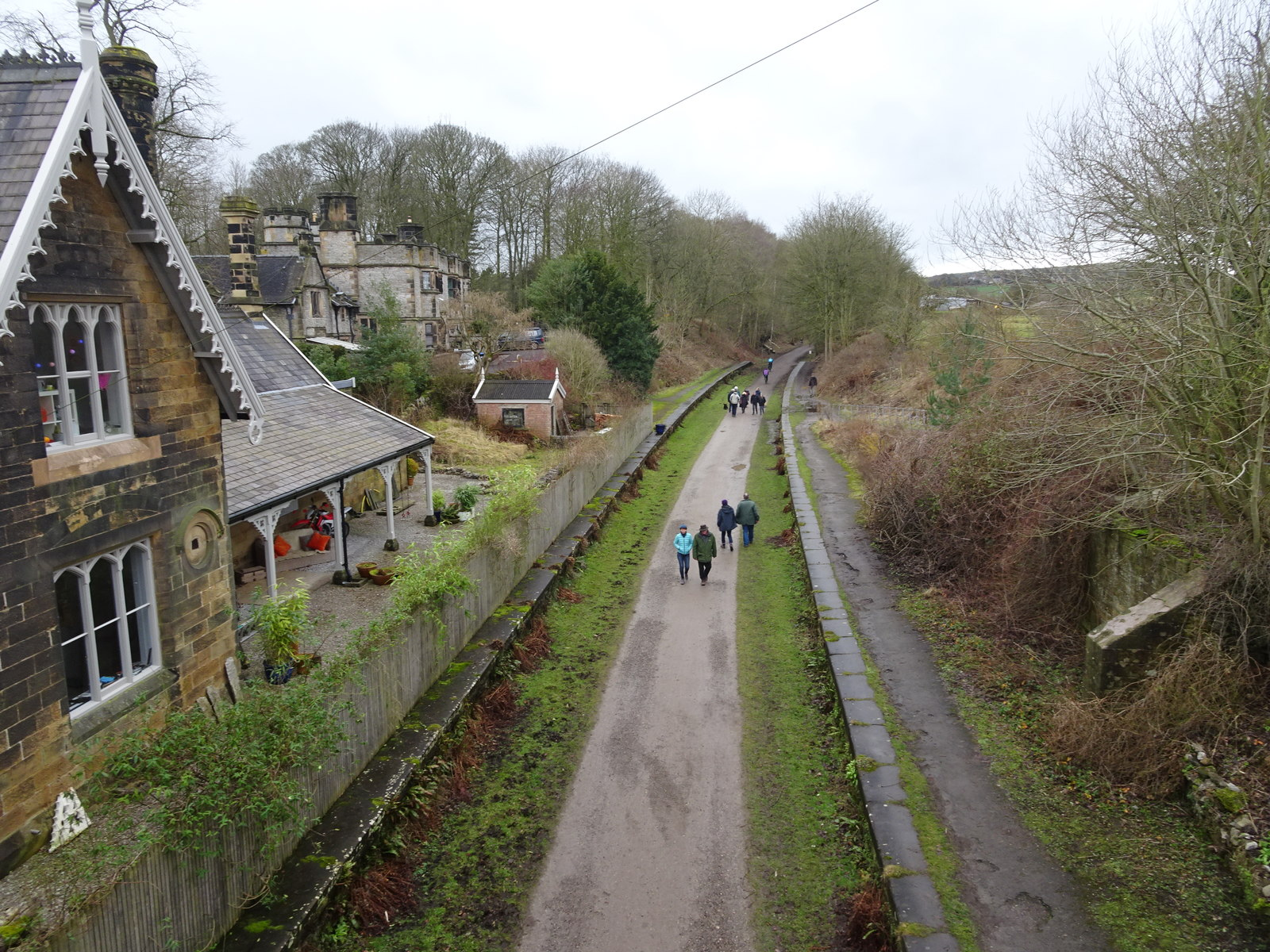
- The site today, showing the Monsal Trail, platforms and station building

General information
- Location: Derbyshire Dales; England
- Coordinates: 53.2367°N 1.7059°W
- Platforms: 2

Other information
- Status: Disused

History
- Original company: Midland Railway
- Pre-grouping: Midland Railway
- Post-grouping: London, Midland and Scottish Railway

Key dates
- 1 June 1863: Station opens as Longstone
- 1 October 1913: Renamed Great Longstone for Ashford
- 10 September 1962: Closed to regular passenger services
- 6 March 1967: Final closure
Location

Great Longstone for Ashford railway station served Great and Little Longstone in the Peak District of Derbyshire, England. It was opened in 1863 by the Midland Railway on its extension of the Manchester, Buxton, Matlock and Midland Junction Railway from Rowsley.

== History ==
The station was known originally as Longstone and was renamed Great Longstone for Ashford in 1913. The station building was designed to match the nearby Thornbridge Hall; the designer of the station building is believed to have been William Barlow, the Midland Railway company engineer. The station was built to serve the communities of Longstone and Ashford-in-the-Water, and was also conveniently sited for the owner of nearby Thornbridge Hall, who at the time was George Marples, a director of the Midland Railway. Once the railway reached Manchester London Road, the line carried expresses to London St Pancras and heavy mineral traffic. It passed to the London, Midland and Scottish Railway in 1923 and British Railways in 1948.

It closed in 1962, although one train a day in each direction continued to stop to allow a local resident, Alice Boardman, to travel to work as a nurse in Buxton; this was chronicled by the British Movietone film It Only Stops For Her. Trains continued to pass through the station until 1968 when the line was closed.

=== Stationmasters ===
From 1926, the stationmaster was also responsible for Hassop; by 1931, the stationmaster managed both Longstone and Monsal Dale instead.

- Joseph Bell 1863–1868
- Richard H. Bell until 1873
- Richard Coe 1873–1906 (formerly station master at Monsal Dale)
- Thomas Harlin 1907–1914 (afterwards station master at Heaton Mersey)
- B. Wilson from 1914
- T.A. Huddlestone 1918-1924 (afterwards station master at Ecclesfield)
- F. Smith 1924–1926 (afterwards station master at Beauchief)
- J. Townson 1926–1931 (also station master at Hassop afterwards station master at Duffield)
- J.H. Adams 1944–1947 (afterwards station master at Radway Green)
- Horace Gundry ca. 1948–ca. 1950

== Route ==
| Preceding station | Disused railways | Following station |
|---|---|---|
| Monsal Dale; Line and station closed | Midland Railway; Manchester, Buxton, Matlock and Midland Junction Railway | Hassop; Line and station closed |

== The site today ==
The station building is Grade II listed and is now a private residence. The trackbed through the station is part of the 8 1/2-mile (13.7 km) Monsal Trail, a shared-use path. Access to the trail can be made at the station site, via the ramp from Longstone Lane.

== See also ==
- Listed buildings in Great Longstone
