= Listed buildings in Little Longstone =

Little Longstone is a civil parish in the Derbyshire Dales district of Derbyshire, England. The parish contains nine listed buildings that are recorded in the National Heritage List for England. All the listed buildings are designated at Grade II, the lowest of the three grades, which is applied to "buildings of national importance and special interest". The parish contains the village of Little Longstone and the surrounding countryside. The listed buildings consist of houses and cottages, a public house, a set of village stocks, a barn, a chapel, a former stable range, and a railway viaduct.

== Buildings ==
Name and location–49	Photograph	Date	Notes
Cosy Cottage and adjoining cottage 53.24601°N 1.73555°W		17th century	A pair of cottages in limestone with gritstone dressings and a Welsh slate roof. There are two storeys, and an L-shaped plan, with two ranges at right angles. Some of the windows in the cottages are sashes, and others are mullioned.
Manor House; 53.24320°N 1.71526°W		17th century	The house is in limestone with gritstone dressings, quoins, a floor band, and a stone slate roof with coped gables, moulded kneelers, and ball finials. There are two storeys and an H-shaped plan, with a front of three bays, the outer bays gabled and projecting. In the centre is a lean-to verandah on two columns, and the windows are mullioned, containing sashes.
Village stocks 53.24379°N 1.71299°W		17th century (or earlier)	The stocks are in an enclosure on the north side of Butts Road. They consist of two limestone piers with curved tops, and slits for the wooden restraints.
Stocks House; 53.24390°N 1.71318°W		17th century (probable)	The house is in limestone with gritstone dressings, and a stone slate roof with coped gables, plain kneelers, and ball finials. There are two storeys and three bays, the left bay gabled and projecting. The windows are mullioned, and in the gable apex is a re-set datestone dated 1578.
Pack Horse Inn; 53.24230°N 1.71648°W		Late 18th century	The public house is in limestone, and has a Welsh slate roof with coped gables and plain kneelers. There are two storeys and four bays. The right two bays are symmetrical and contain a central doorway and mullioned windows. The left two bays also have a central doorway, garage doors to the left, a mullioned window to the right, and sash windows in the upper floor.
Dutch Barn; 53.24764°N 1.71683°W	—	Early 19th century	The barn is in limestone with gritstone dressing, quoins, a floor band, and a stone slate roof. There are two storeys and six bays. In the upper floor are four round-arched openings, the ground floor contains various openings, and all the openings have quoined surrounds.
Congregational Chapel; 53.24145°N 1.72040°W		1844	The chapel is in limestone with gritstone dressings, quoins, and a Welsh slate roof with moulded kneelers. The entrance front has a round-arched doorway with a chamfered and quoined surround, and recessed doors. Above it is a circular opening with a chamfered and quoined surround, and at the top is a gabled bellcote. The entrance is flanked by slit windows with circular heads, and along the sides are three round-headed windows with chamfered surrounds.
Stable block west of Manor House; 53.24285°N 1.71564°W		Mid 19th century	The stable block, which has been converted for residential use, is in limestone with gritstone dressings, and a Welsh slate roof with coped gables, moulded kneelers, and square finials. There are two storeys, and a central projecting part with a coped embattled parapet containing a doorway and a carriage entrance with segmental heads. The outer bays are gabled, and each contains segmental-headed openings.
Monsal Dale Viaduct; 53.24096°N 1.72805°W		1862–63	The viaduct was built by the Manchester, Buxton, Matlock and Midland Junction Railway to carry its line over the valley of the River Wye. It is in limestone with Staffordshire blue brick dressings, and repairs in gritstone and red brick. The viaduct consists of five round arches with blue brick voussoirs, and is 300 feet (91 m) long and 70 feet (21 m) high. It is now used as a footpath and cycleway.
