= Hassop railway station =

Former railway station in Derbyshire, England

Hassop
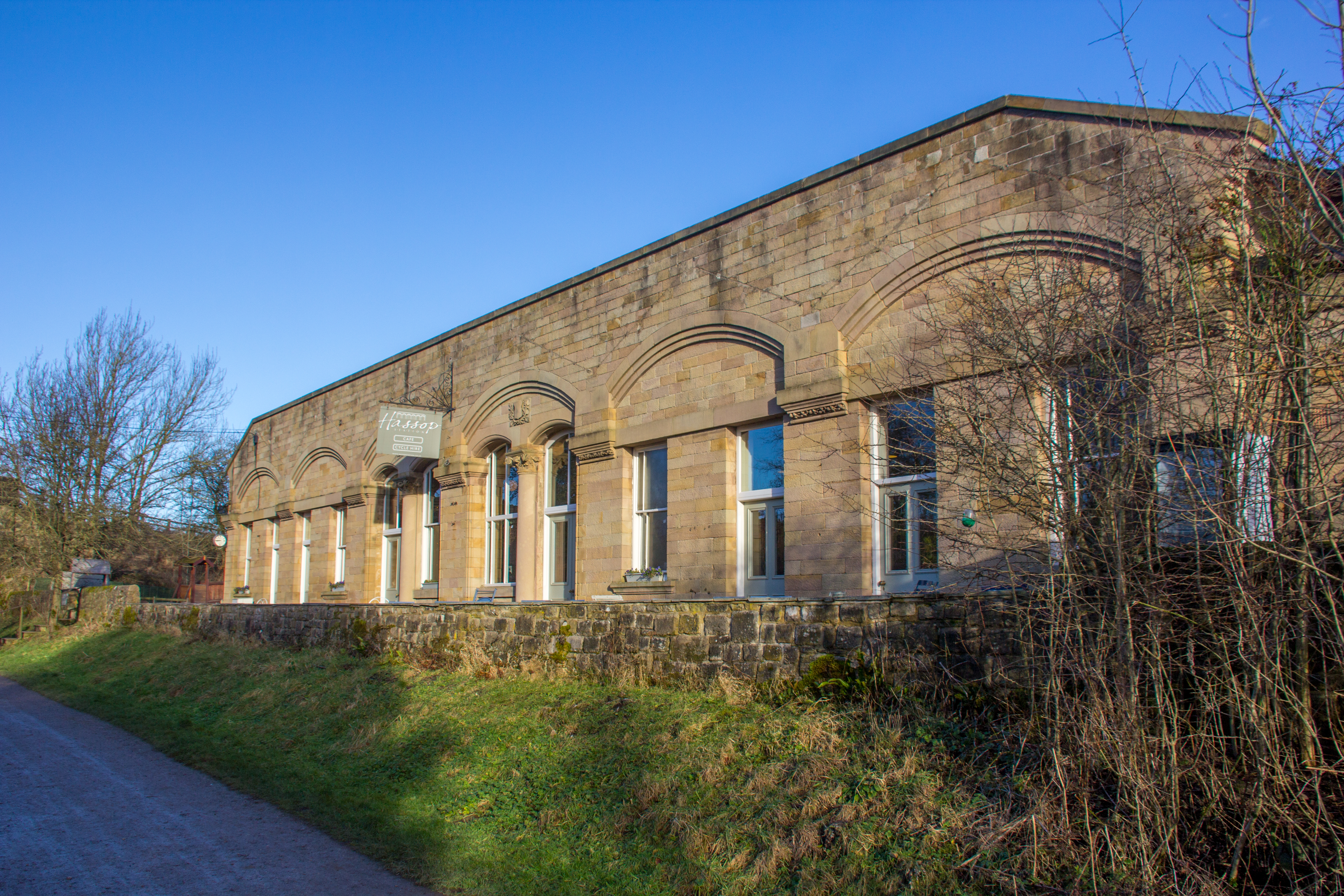
- Hassop station today, with the Monsal Trail passing to the left

General information
- Location: Hassop, Derbyshire Dales, England
- Coordinates: 53.2312°N 1.6758°W
- Platforms: 2

Other information
- Status: Disused

History
- Original company: Midland Railway
- Pre-grouping: Midland Railway
- Post-grouping: London, Midland and Scottish Railway

Key dates
- 1 August 1862: Station opens as Hassop
- circa 1870: Renamed Hassop for Chatsworth
- circa 1906: Renamed Hassop
- 17 August 1942: Closed for passengers
- 5 October 1964: Closed for goods
Location

Hassop railway station was situated about two miles from the village of Hassop, in the Peak District of Derbyshire, England. It was opened in 1862 by the Midland Railway on its extension of the Manchester, Buxton, Matlock and Midlands Junction Railway from Rowsley.

It was built for the benefit of the Duke of Devonshire of Chatsworth House who, having previously declined to allow the railway to pass over the easier terrain of his lands, belatedly saw its possible benefit. Indeed, for a while it was renamed Hassop for Chatsworth. However, in this sparsely populated area, it saw little patronage and closed in 1942. Its greatest use was as a goods yard, which closed in 1964.

== History ==
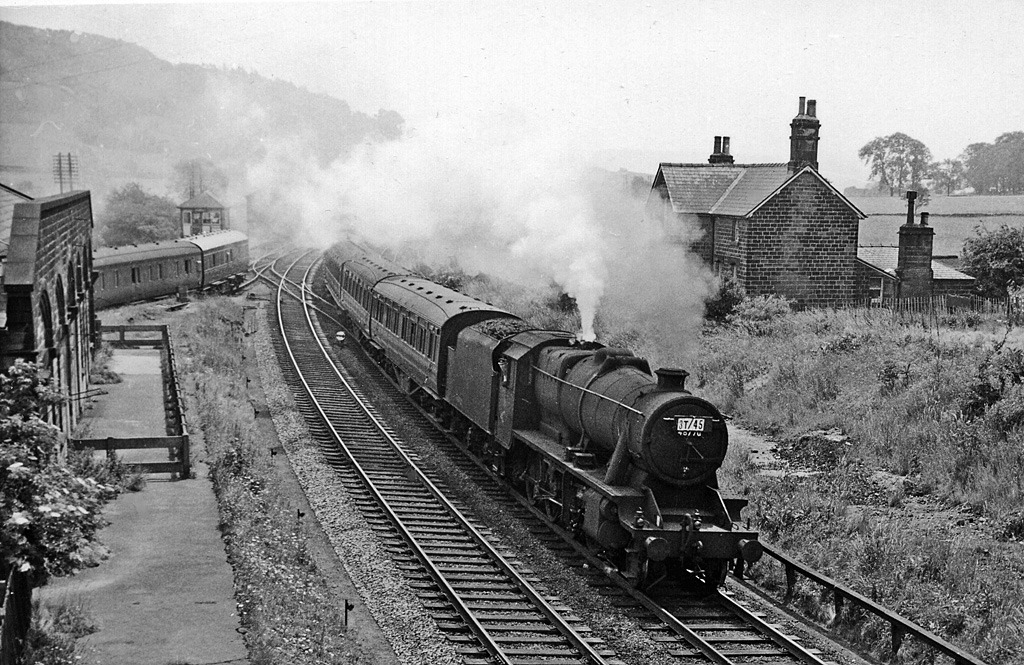
The remains of Hassop station in 1961

Opened by the Manchester, Buxton, Matlock and Midlands Junction Railway, then becoming part of the Midland Railway, the station became part of the London, Midland and Scottish Railway (LMS) during the grouping of 1923. It was host to a LMS camping coach from 1934 to 1939. The station then closed to passengers in 1942.

== Route ==
Preceding station	Disused railways	Following station
Longstone; Line and station closed	Midland Railway; Manchester, Buxton, Matlock and Midland Junction Railway	Bakewell; Line and station closed

== The site today ==
The station building has since been renovated by Hassop Station Ltd. It is now a family friendly cafe, with outdoor covered seating, play area, book shop, gift shop and cycle hire facility. Disabled access and toilets are available here, along with a large car park.

The trackbed forms part of the Monsal Trail, a shared-use path. Four tunnels, located between the Great Longstone station and Topley Pike Junction sites, were reopened on the trail in May 2011; this lengthened the trail to a continuous 8 1/2 miles (13.7 km) for cyclists walkers and riders.
