= Cressbrook =

Village in Derbyshire, England

Coordinates: 53.255°N 1.749°W

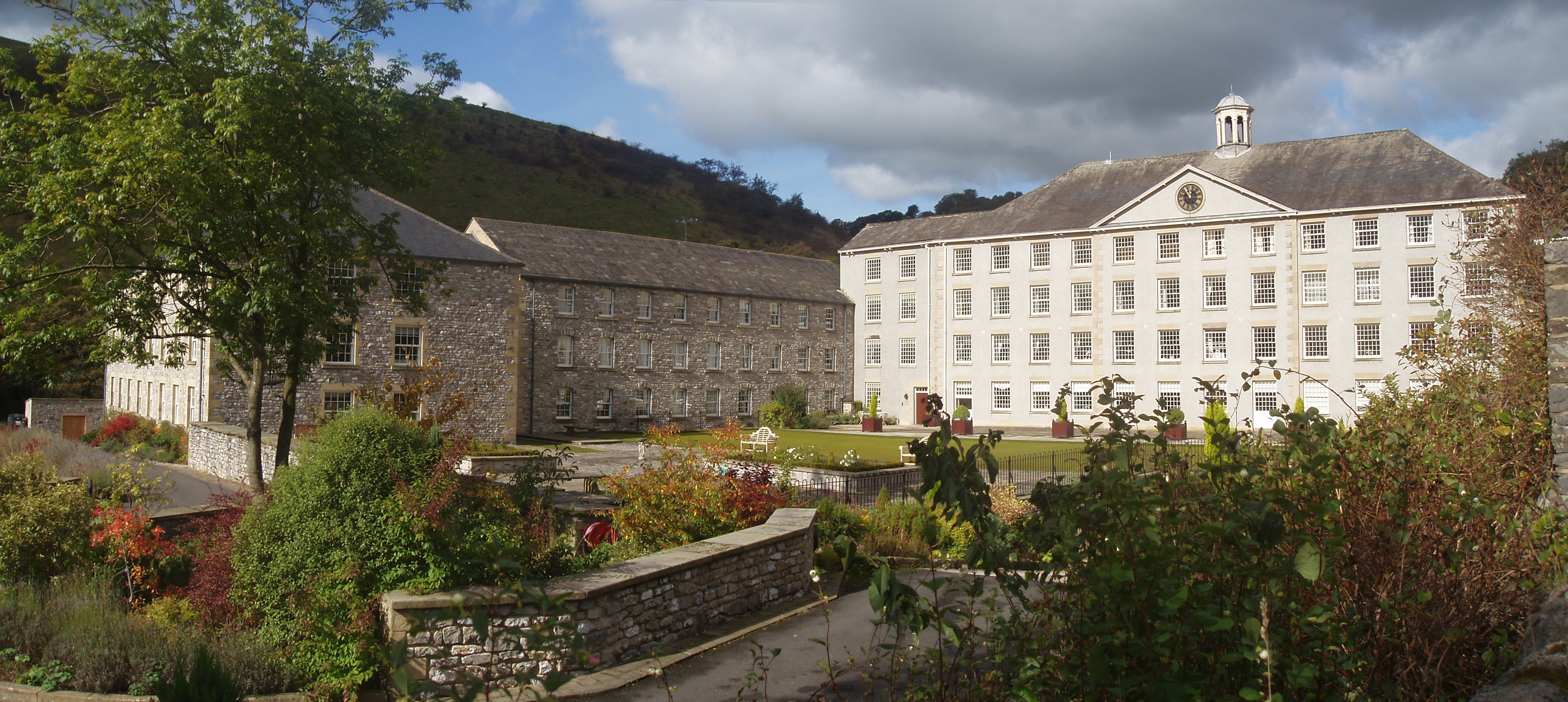
- Cressbrook Mill complex, from the road

- Location within Derbyshire
- OS grid reference: SK168731
- District: Derbyshire Dales
- Shire county: Derbyshire
- Region: East Midlands
- Country: England
- Sovereign state: United Kingdom
- Post town: BUXTON
- Postcode district: SK17
- Dialling code: 01298
- Police: Derbyshire
- Fire: Derbyshire
- Ambulance: East Midlands
- UK Parliament: High Peak

Cressbrook is a village in the Peak District National Park in Derbyshire, England. It lies in Water-cum-Jolly Dale at the foot of Cressbrook Dale. Population details at the 2011 Census are included in the civil parish of Litton. Before the Litton Inclosure Act 1763 (3 Geo. 3. c. 31 Pr.) Cressbrook did not exist. It later grew up around a textile mill complex built alongside the River Wye, first by Richard Arkwright and then later by his son Richard, JL Philips and Brother Cotton Spinners and McConnel and Company.

Until McConnel's period of ownership the village did not exist beyond a collection of buildings in the immediate vicinity of the mill. When McConnel's workforce objected to the quality of the housing available he took it upon himself to build the model village that became Cressbrook. Building started in the late 1830s and was later extended by Henry McConnel's daughter, Mary Worthington, in 1902 to include a village club, modelled on a working men's club. Cressbrook Mill went bankrupt in 1965, after which time it changed from being a private mill estate to the public village that it now is.

The Monsal Trail passes Cressbrook Mill. This 8.5-mile (13.7-kilometre) walk and cycleway mostly follows the old trackbed of the Manchester, Buxton, Matlock and Midlands Junction Railway where, from 1866 to 1959, the village of Cressbrook was served by Monsal Dale railway station. Until May 2011 the Cressbrook Tunnel (and others) were closed to walkers and cyclists for safety reasons and the trail diverted across the River Wye next to the mill.

David Cannon McConnel emigrated to Queensland, Australia in 1840. In 1841, he established the Cressbrook Homestead named after their home town. The homestead in turn gives its name to the modern-day localities of Cressbrook, Queensland and Lower Cressbrook, Queensland.

== Publications ==
The history of Cressbrook was recently captured in the book Behind The View — Life and times in Cressbrook, a Derbyshire Mill village. This was written by and published by the Cressbrook Community association with the help of a grant from the Local Heritage Initiative, a Countryside Agency project.

Bill Bryson writes warmly about Cressbrook Mill in his 2015 travel memoir The Road to Little Dribbling: More Notes from a Small Island.

== See also ==
- Listed buildings in Litton, Derbyshire
