= Hassop =

Village in Derbyshire, England

Coordinates: 53.247°N 1.667°W

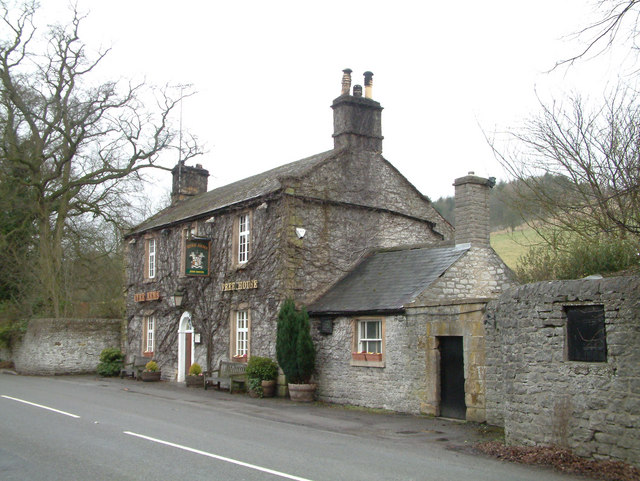
- The Eyre Arms, Hassop

- Location within Derbyshire
- OS grid reference: SK223722
- District: Derbyshire Dales
- Shire county: Derbyshire
- Region: East Midlands
- Country: England
- Sovereign state: United Kingdom
- Post town: BAKEWELL
- Postcode district: DE45
- Dialling code: 01629
- Police: Derbyshire
- Fire: Derbyshire
- Ambulance: East Midlands
- UK Parliament: Derbyshire Dales

Hassop is a village in the local government district of Derbyshire Dales in Derbyshire, England. It is in the civil parish of Great Longstone

It developed around a number of lead mines, with such names as "The Brightside", "Backdale", "Harry Bruce", "Waterhole" and "Whitecoe", which lasted until the mid-nineteenth century.

The local landowners were the Eyre family of Padley, who built Hassop Hall. In 1643 they defended the house against the Parliamentarians. Manholes in the floor of the cellar are reputed to allow entrance to a former lead-mine under the Hall. Hassop Hall was extensively rebuilt in Classical style between 1827 and 1833. It is now a private hotel.

The Church of All Saints was built in 1816-18 for the Eyre family.

Hassop railway station was about two miles south of the village, built by the Manchester, Buxton, Matlock and Midlands Junction Railway in 1863. It closed in 1964 and the station building has since been converted to a bookshop and cafe. The trackbed through the station is part of the 8.5 mile Monsal Trail, a walk and cycleway.

== See also ==
- Listed buildings in Hassop
