= Millers Dale railway station =

Former railway station in Derbyshire, England

Millers Dale
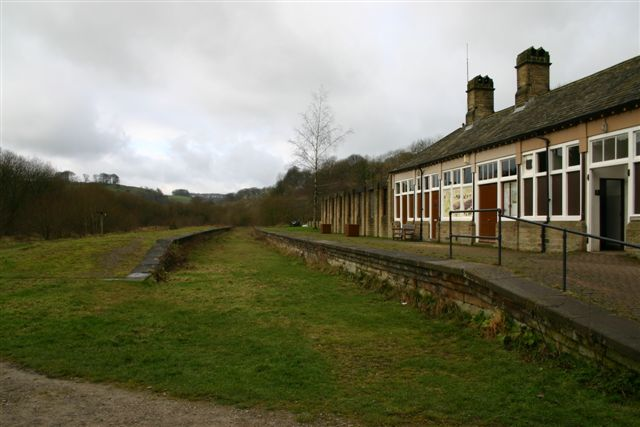

General information
- Location: Millers Dale, High Peak; England
- Coordinates: 53.2563°N 1.7932°W
- Grid reference: SK135733
- Platforms: 5

Other information
- Status: Disused

History
- Pre-grouping: Midland Railway
- Post-grouping: London, Midland and Scottish Railway

Key dates
- 1 June 1863: Opened as Millers Dale
- 1 May 1889: Renamed Millers Dale for Tideswell
- 14 June 1965: Renamed Millers Dale
- 6 March 1967: Closed
Location

Millers Dale railway station was in Millers Dale, near Tideswell, in Derbyshire, England. It was opened in 1863 by the Midland Railway on its line from Rowsley, extending the Manchester, Buxton, Matlock and Midlands Junction Railway. It closed in 1967 and the site is now used as a car park for the Monsal Trail, which follows the trackbed.

== History ==
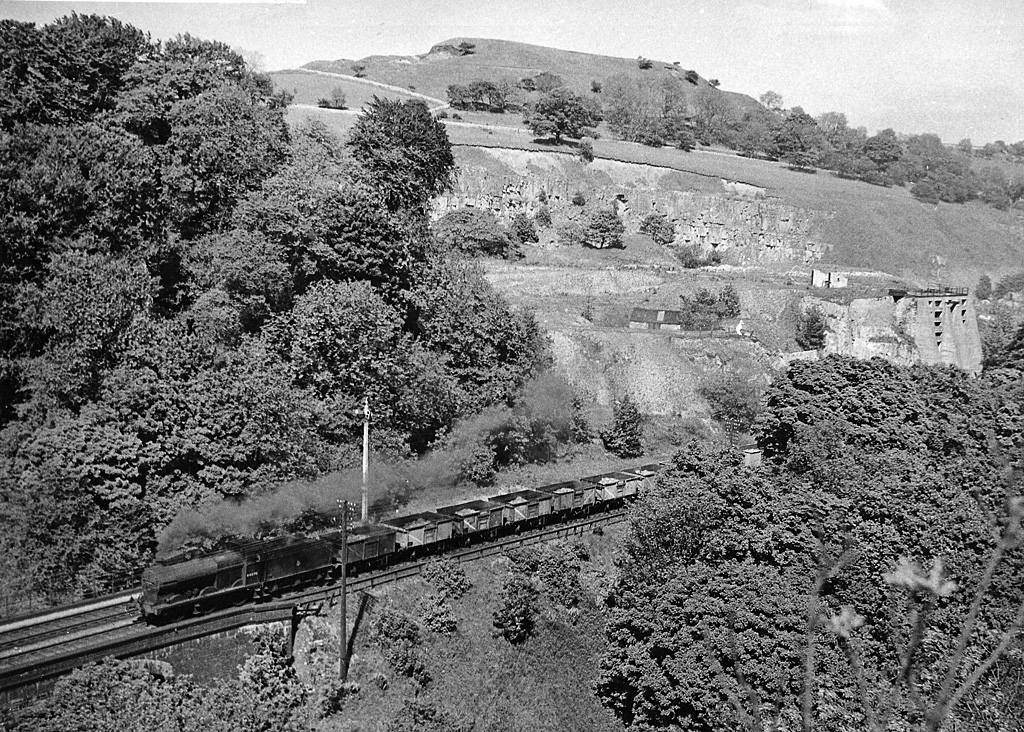
Millers Dale, with a down freight passing in 1957

Opened in 1863, it served as an important junction where passengers for Buxton joined or left the trains between London St Pancras and Manchester London Road. It was originally to be called Blackwell Mill but was opened as Millers Dale instead; from 1889, it became Millers Dale for Tideswell. For such a rural location, it was unusually large; indeed, it was one of the largest stations on the line and was one of the few stations in England to have a post office on the platform.

Millers Dale also sent dairy, agricultural and quarried products (mainly lime and limestone) from the surrounding areas to the major cities. While also serving local towns and villages (notably Tideswell, Taddington and Wormhill), much of its activity was concerned with the connecting service to and from Buxton. Traffic for Buxton actually followed the main line north for nearly two miles (3.2 km), before diverging at Millers Dale Junction, just east of Blackwell Mill Halt.

Changing at Millers Dale often involved a wait and the High Peak News of November 1900 referred to the station as "Patience Junction". The station was later immortalised in the 1964 song "Slow Train" by Flanders and Swann.

The station closed in 1967, but trains continued to pass through until 1968 when the line was closed.

=== Stationmasters ===
- T. Turner 1863 - 1864 (afterwards station master at Kibworth)
- W. Fry 1864 - 1865
- W. Palmer from 1865 (formerly station master at Brightside)
- H. Lewis until 1872 (afterwards station master at Ripple)
- W. Whitmore from 1872 - 1898
- Joseph Henry Clarke 1898 - 1904 (afterwards station master at Matlock Bridge)
- W.E Coates 1905 - 1908 (afterwards station master at Kegworth)
- John Alderson 1908 - 1920 (afterwards station master at Skipton)
- A. Foster ca. 1937

== Route ==
Preceding station	Disused railways	Following station
Peak Forest; Line and station closed	Midland Railway; New Mills-Millers Dale line	Monsal Dale; Line and station closed
Blackwell Mill; Line and station closed	Midland Railway; Manchester, Buxton, Matlock and Midland Junction Railway	Monsal Dale; Line and station closed

To the west of the station, the line crossed the River Wye three times and ran through the 401 yards (367 m) and 94 yards (86 m) Chee Tunnels and the 121 yards (111 m) Rusher Hall tunnel, before reaching the New Mills line junction (officially Millers Dale Junction), 1.25 miles (2.01 km) from the station.

== Platforms ==
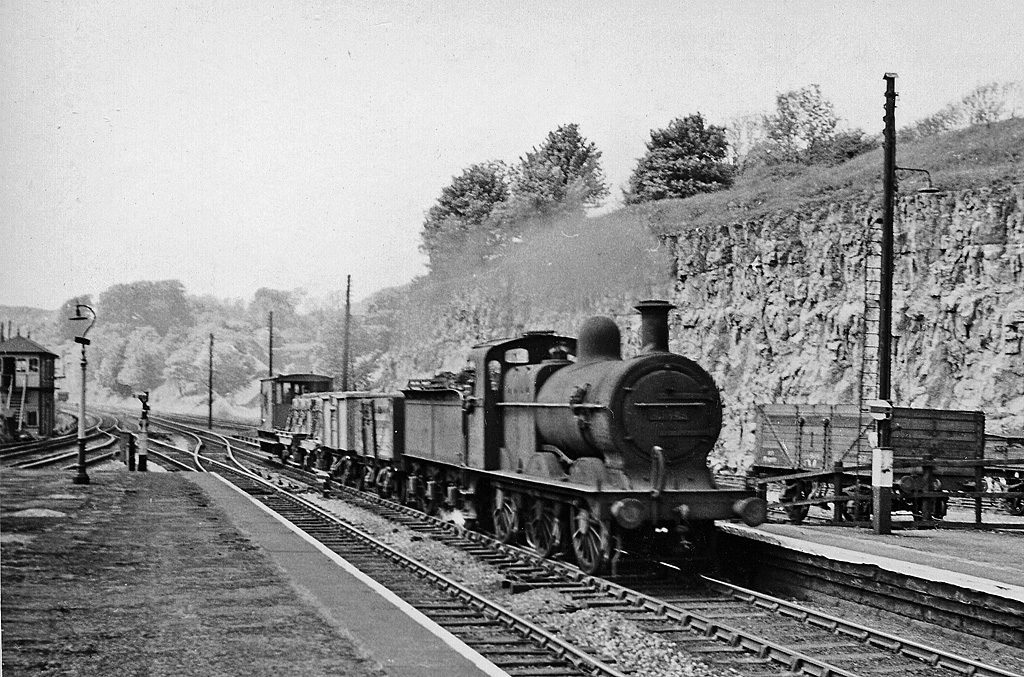
An up local goods train in 1957

Built on a shelf carved out of the hillside, Millers Dale station had two platforms originally, but a bay platform was added later to accommodate Buxton trains; the former up platform became an island platform in 1905 to serve the extra tracks on the north side of the station. The new loops, the additional platforms, the new main station building and the second (northerly) viaduct were opened on 20 August 1905. The old viaduct was then closed, strengthened and reopened in April 1906. Whilst the piers for the two viaducts are identical, the older viaduct is supported by an arch structure, whereas the later one is a box structure.

Part of the original act of Parliament approving the line considered the needs of invalids taking the waters at Buxton and so, for a while, 'through' carriages for Buxton were attached to, and detached from, expresses, thus alleviating the problem of changing trains. In addition, the two main platforms were connected by a subway.

== The site today ==
Since the railway was closed, the station site has become a car park serving the Monsal Trail, an 8.5-mile (13.7 km)-long shared-use path; it is under the management of the Peak District National Park Authority, which took on the trail and associated infrastructure in the early 1980s.

The main buildings remain, which date from 1905, now acting as a café and visitor information point, public toilets and exhibition. The station waiting area and booking office was reopened as a cafe now known as the Refreshment Rooms in 2019, following an extensive £230,000 restoration led by the National Park Authority. In 2022, the former goods shed reopened after a £330,000 EU-funded restoration; it now includes a self-guided interpretive and information exhibition open at all times when the café is in operation.

The hamlet of Millers Dale is still dominated by the two large disused viaducts over the Wye Valley, the older of which became part of the Monsal Trail.

== See also ==
- Cycleways in England
