= Monsal Trail =

Bridleway in the English Peak District

Coordinates: 53.2447°N 1.7317°W

The Monsal Trail is a cycling, horse riding and walking trail in the Derbyshire Peak District. It was constructed from a section of the former Manchester, Buxton, Matlock and Midland Junction Railway, which was built by the Midland Railway in 1863 to link Manchester with London and closed in 1968. The Monsal Trail is about 8.5 miles (13.7 km) long and opened in 1981. It starts at the Topley Pike junction in Wye Dale, 3 miles (4.8 km) east of Buxton, and runs to Coombs Viaduct, 1 mile (1.6 km) south-east of Bakewell. It follows the valley of the River Wye. The trail passes through Blackwell Mill, Chee Dale, Millers Dale, Cressbrook, Monsal Dale, Great Longstone, Hassop and Bakewell. The trail has numerous landmarks including Headstone Viaduct, Cressbrook Mill, Litton Mill and Hassop railway station, and passes through six tunnels.

It is a major part of the as yet incomplete White Peak Loop and is designated as National Cycle Route 680.

== History ==
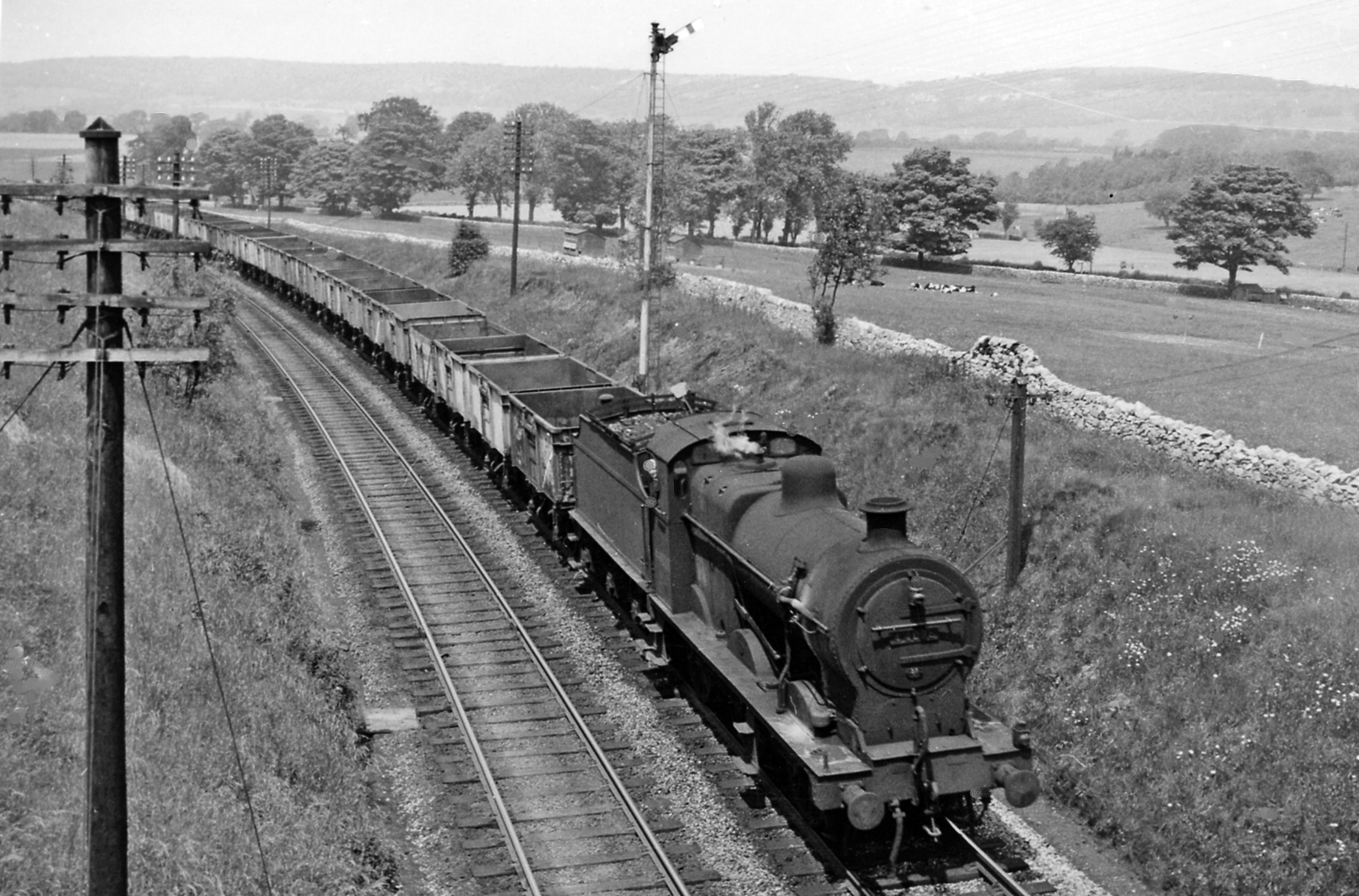
The former railway line near Hassop Railway Station

The Monsall Trail follows a section of the former Manchester, Buxton, Matlock and Midlands Junction Railway, built by the Midland Railway in 1863 to link Manchester with London. The line was closed in 1968 by the Labour Minister for Transport Barbara Castle, not by the Beeching Axe, and remained unused for twelve years before being taken over by the Peak District National Park.

The route through the Wye valley was necessitated by the Duke of Devonshire's objection to the railway passing through his land (which included not only Chatsworth House, but extensive grounds north of Rowsley). The route meant that the line had to pass above the town of Bakewell, rather than through it. The Duke of Rutland, of Haddon Hall, insisted on the construction of Haddon Tunnel to hide it from his view, but he used Bakewell railway station, which was built to a grander design than normal and carried his coat of arms. The Duke of Devonshire later realised the value of the railway, and his offer for the Midland Railway to run through Chatsworth came too late. He was the force behind the construction of Hassop railway station, which, although nearer to Bakewell than Hassop village, meant he did not have to share a railway station with his neighbour. Great Longstone station (Longstone before 1913) served Thornbridge Hall, and the railway station design, with leaded glass windows, reflected the architecture of the hall.

For many years the trail could not follow the trackbed through the tunnels at Monsal Head and Cressbrook which were closed for safety reasons and the trail was diverted to avoid them. The tunnels were walked by Julia Bradbury in BBC TV's Railway Walks: The Peak Express. Many access points and diversion paths were unsuitable for cyclists, wheelchairs or people with walking difficulties because of steep uneven stone steps or narrow paths. Plans to make the tunnels safe and re-open them to the public were given the go-ahead at a cost of £3.785 million. The tunnels were formally opened on 25 May 2011 at a ceremony at the Headstone Viaduct after being used from 13 May 2011. The trail can be used by wheelchair users with level access at Bakewell, Hassop railway station (disabled toilets at Bakewell and Millers Dale railway stations) and Millers Dale.

Reopening the railway line is supported by Derbyshire County Council in principle, but there remain "significant challenges [that] would need to be understood before it could be considered viable," according to the Labour mayor Claire Ward.

== Route description ==
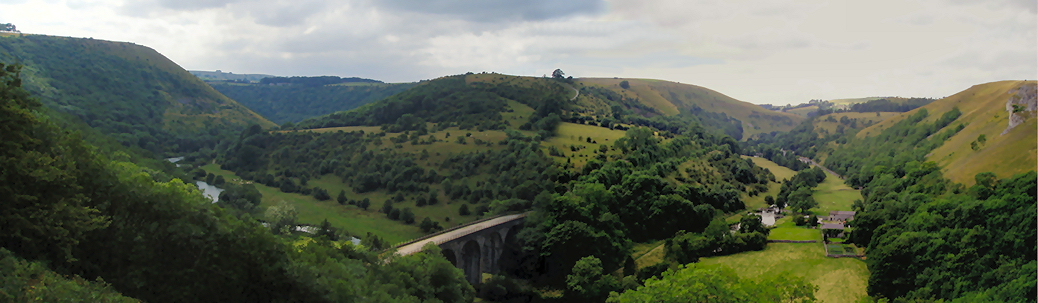
Headstone Viaduct viewed from Monsal Head

The Monsal Trail is about 8.5 miles (13.7 km) long and opened in 1981. It starts at the Topley Pike junction (in Wye Dale, 3 miles (4.8 km) east of Buxton) and runs to Coombs Viaduct, 1 mile (1.6 km) south-east of Bakewell. It follows the valley of the River Wye and runs parallel to the A6. From the Wyedale car park, the easiest access point for the northern end of the trail, there is a walk of about 1 kilometre (0.62 mi), with the last part up steps, to reach the trail. Starting at the south of the trail, "from Market Place in Bakewell, follow Sheffield Road and cross the five-arched bridge of the River Wye, turn right and ascend Station Road to the former Bakewell railway station and car park on your left."

The trail passes through Blackwell Mill, Millers Dale, Cressbrook, Monsal Dale, Great Longstone, Hassop and Bakewell. At Longstone and Hassop the railway stations were some distance from the villages.

Derbyshire County Council support the creation of a circular cycle route linking Buxton, Bakewell and Matlock with the High Peak Trail. Dubbed the White Peak Loop, it includes extending the Monsal Trail to Matlock, a proposal which received strong support from a public consultation exercise in 2014. The 5-mile (8.0 km) section between Rowsley and Matlock opened in March 2018, running adjacent to the railway trackbed except for minor diversions just north of Rowsley South, at Darley Dale, and at Matlock. The remaining 2.5-mile (4.0 km) section of the route between Bakewell (Coombs Viaduct) and Rowsley is at the design stage. When complete, the section will run for the most part along the railway trackbed and require new bridges at Rowsley and the refurbishment and opening up of the 1-km Haddon Tunnel.

== Landmarks ==
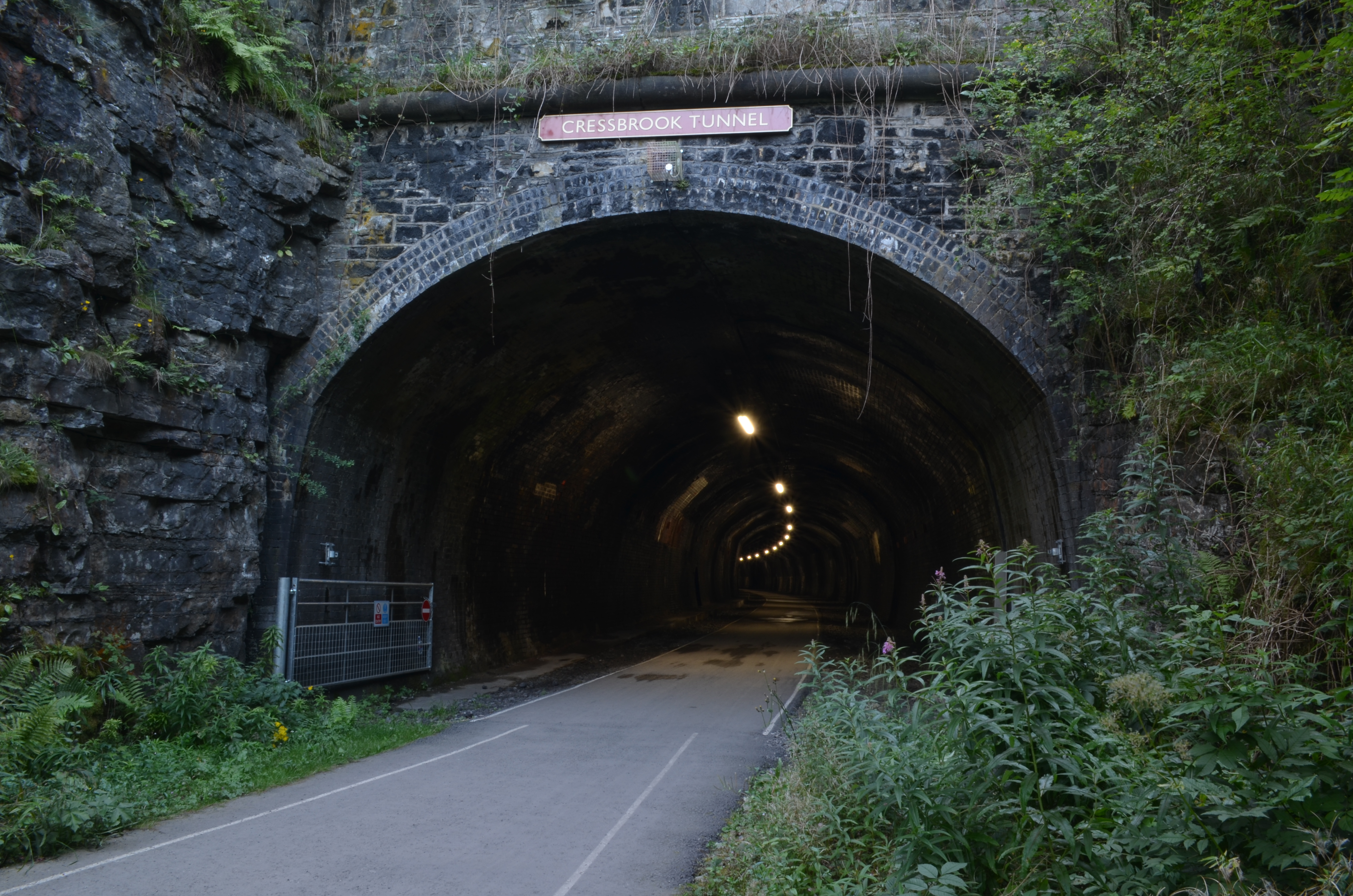
Cressbrook Tunnel, one of six on the trail

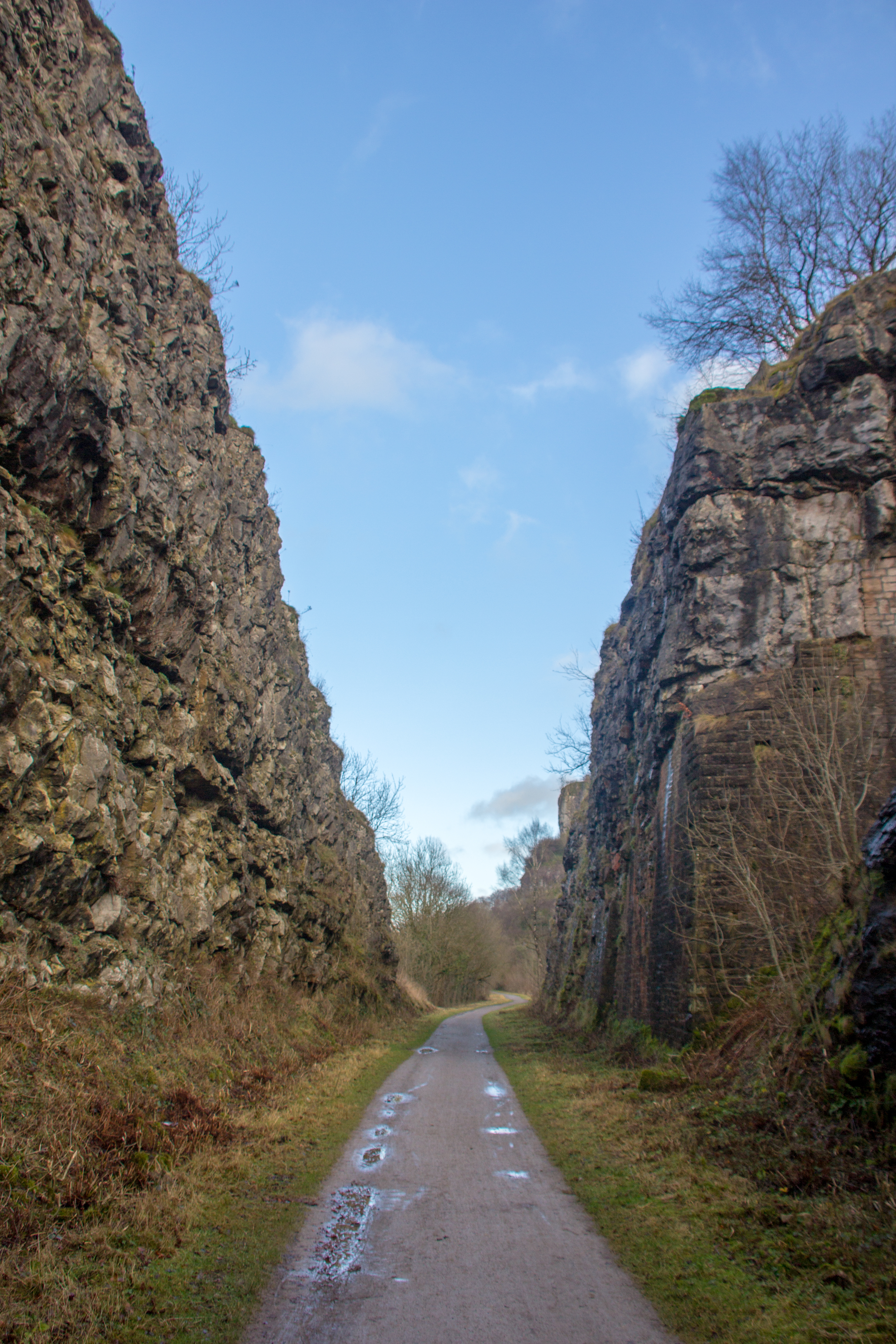
A cutting made for the railway

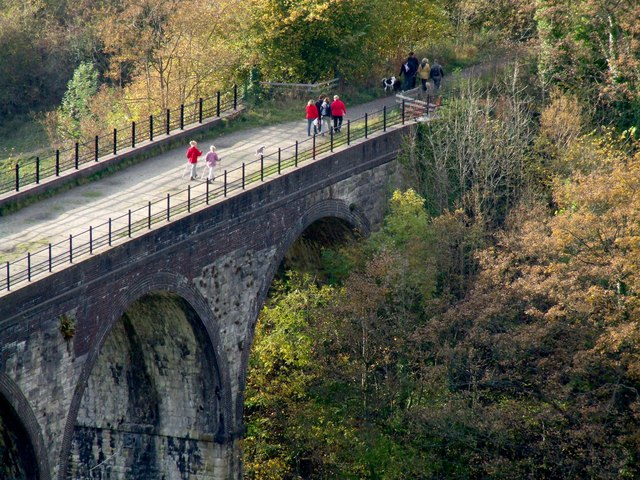
Walkers on the Monsal Trail

=== Headstone Viaduct ===
Headstone Viaduct, at Monsal Head, is one of the more impressive structures on the line, although when built it was seen as destroying the beauty of the dale. John Ruskin, a poet and conservationist of the time, criticised the building of the railway:

There was a rocky valley between Buxton and Bakewell, once upon a time, divine as the Vale of Tempe... You Enterprised a Railroad through the valley – you blasted its rocks away, heaped thousands of tons of shale into its lovely stream. The valley is gone, and the Gods with it; and now, every fool in Buxton can be in Bakewell in half an hour, and every fool in Bakewell at Buxton; which you think a lucrative process of exchange – you Fools everywhere.

— Fors Clavigera: Letters to the Workmen and Labourers of Great Britain

His words are displayed on the viaduct. When the railway closed and there was talk of demolishing the viaduct, there was considerable opposition. In 1970 it was designated as a Grade II listed building.

=== Cressbrook Mill ===
Cressbrook Mill opened as a cotton mill in 1783, powered by water from Cressbrook stream. It was built on the site of a distillery by William Newton of Abney. The original building was destroyed by fire.

=== Litton Mill ===
Litton Mill was a large cotton spinning mill that opened in 1782. It was notorious for the harsh treatment of child labourers by the owner, Ellis Needham. Many of the children, brought from London and other large cities, died young from the cruel treatment.

=== Hassop railway station ===
Hassop railway station was situated about two miles from the village. It was opened in 1862 by the Midland Railway on its extension of the Manchester, Buxton, Matlock and Midlands Junction Railway from Rowsley.

=== Tunnels ===
The trail passes through the following tunnels:

- Headstone: 533 yards (487 m)
- Cressbrook: 471 yards (431 m) through limestone, 1 in 100 gradient
- Litton: 515 yards (471 m) through limestone, 1 in 100 gradient
- Chee Tor 1: 401 yards (367 m)
- Chee Tor 2: 91 yards (83 m)
- Rusher Cutting Tunnel: 121 yards (111 m)

A further tunnel, Haddon Tunnel, is currently closed on safety grounds but has been proposed for reopening.

== Recreation ==
The route is used for recreation purposes by cyclists, walkers, horse riders, wheelchair users and joggers. A 5 km Parkrun, run entirely on the Monsal Trail, takes place every Saturday morning at 9am; it starts at Hassop railway station, passing Thornbridge Hall, continuing to Headstone tunnel and then turning around to finish where it began.

== See also ==
- Manchester, Buxton, Matlock and Midlands Junction Railway
- Cycleways in England
