= Manchester, Buxton, Matlock and Midlands Junction Railway =

Railway in England

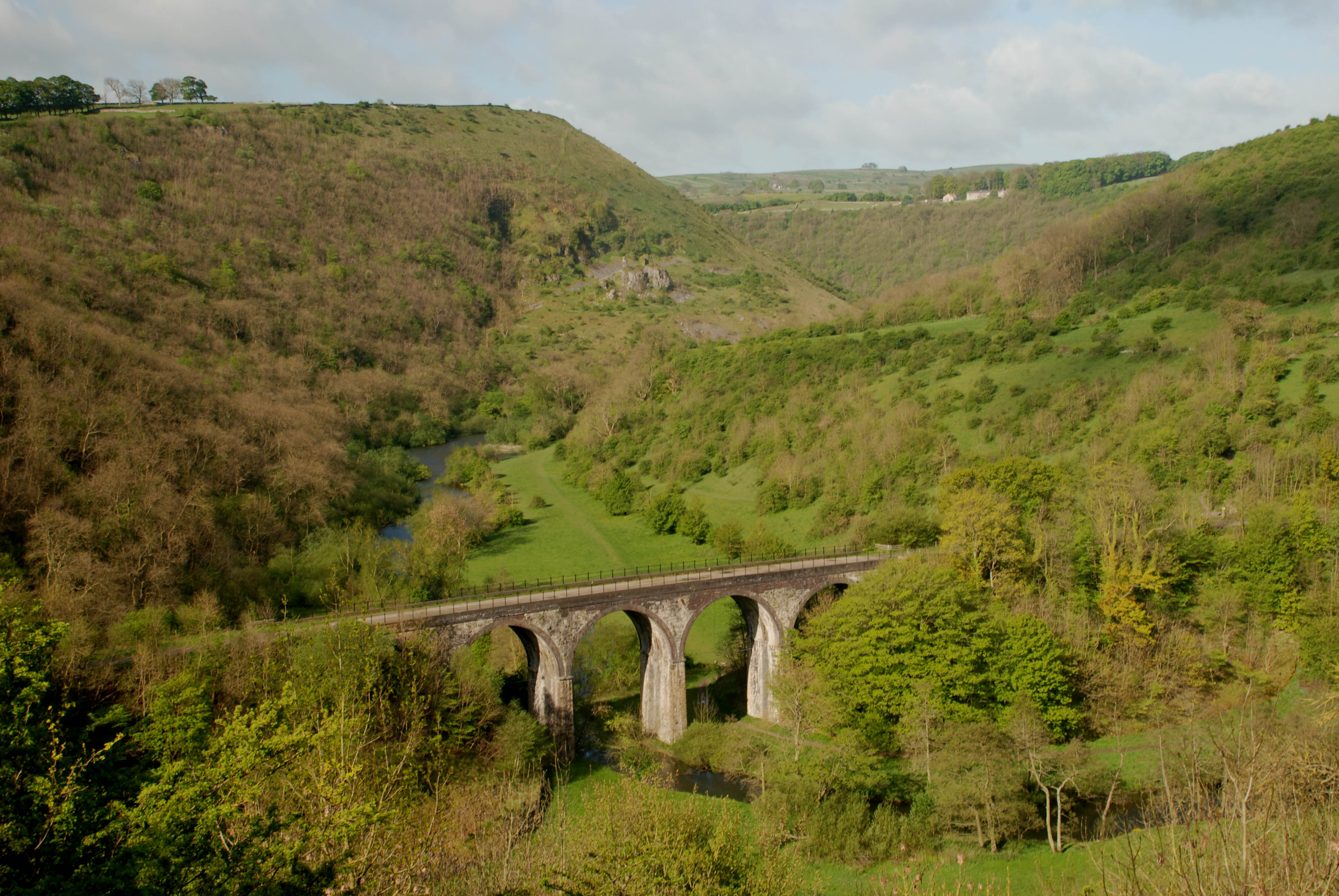
This view of Headstone Viaduct across Monsal Dale typifies the country through which the line passed

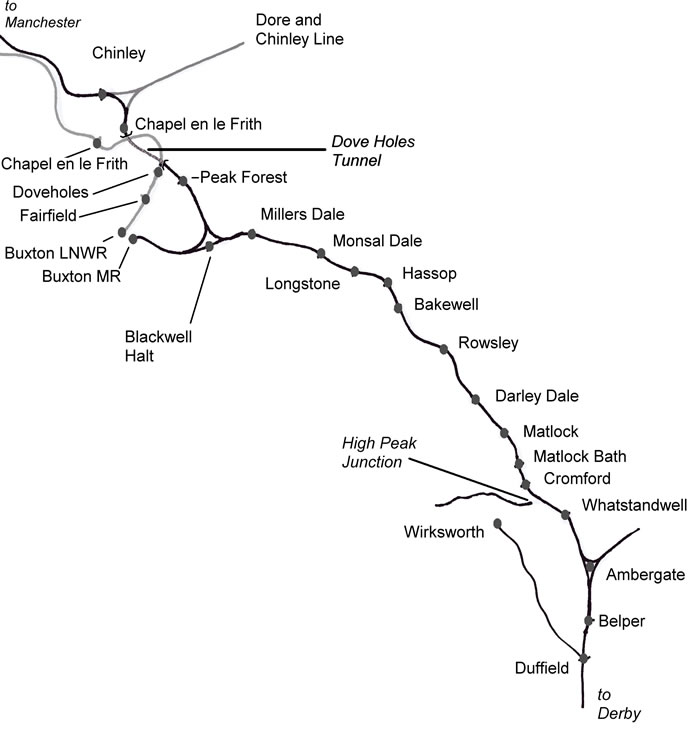
Sketchmap of the Manchester, Buxton, Matlock and Midland Railway and connections

Fragment of a map showing the proposed route of the line. Notice the route through the Goyt Valley. Also the north-facing junction at Ambergate

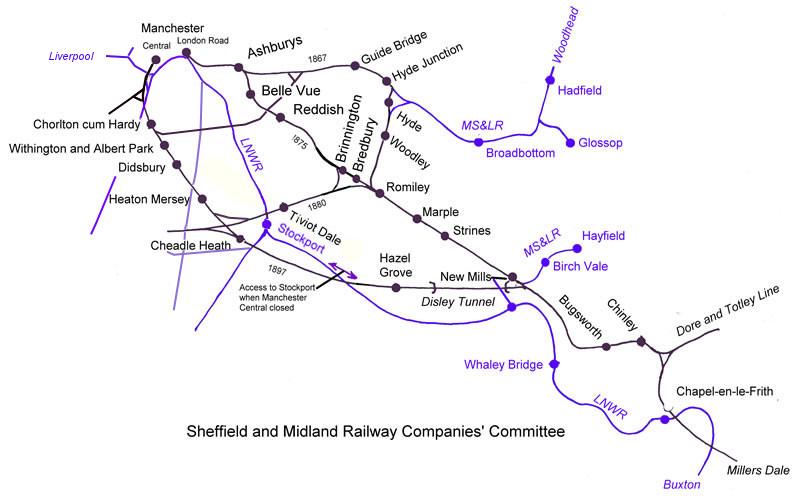
The various routes followed by the Midland into Manchester

The Manchester, Buxton, Matlock and Midlands Junction Railway ran from a junction with the Midland Railway at Ambergate to Rowsley north of Matlock and thence to Buxton.

In time it would become part of the Midland Railway's main line between London and Manchester, but it was initially planned as a route from Manchester to the East of England, via the proposed Ambergate, Nottingham, Boston and Eastern Junction Railway which would meet it a little further north along the North Midland line at Ambergate. The act of Parliament, Manchester, Buxton, Matlock and Midlands Junction Railway Act 1846, for a line from just south of Stockport to Ambergate was passed in 1846.

Currently, the section north of Millers Dale is open as the Great Rocks freight line, Derby to Matlock still holds passenger services as the Derwent Valley line, Matlock to Rowsley is the Peak Rail heritage line, and Rowsley to Buxton has become the Monsal Trail for cycling, horse riding and walking.

== Ambergate to Rowsley ==
Manchester, Buxton, Matlock and Midlands Junction Railway Act 1846
- Act of Parliament
- Parliament of the United Kingdom
- Long title: An Act for making a Railway from the Manchester and Birmingham Railway at Cheadle in the County of Chester to or near to the Ambergate Station of the Midlands Railway in the County of Derby, to be called "The Manchester, Buxton, Matlock, and Midlands Junction Railway."
- Citation: 9 & 10 Vict. c. cxcii)

Dates
- Royal assent: 16 July 1846

The initial plan was for "An Act for making a Railway from the Manchester and Birmingham Railway at Cheadle in the County of Chester to or near to the Ambergate Station of the Midlands Railway in the County of Derby, to be called "The Manchester, Buxton, Matlock, and Midlands Junction Railway" The bill received royal assent as the Manchester, Buxton, Matlock and Midlands Junction Railway Act 1846 (9 & 10 Vict. c. cxcii).

The line opened as far as Rowsley on 4 June 1849, but went no further, having run out of money giving its promoters something of a problem.

Matlock Bath had long been a tourist town. Since the station at Ambergate had been opened, tourists had been brought in by coach and canal. Around thirty coaches had passed that way each day, with sixty or seventy thousand visitors going on to Chatsworth House. The aim then was to develop the trade further.

Manchester, Buxton, Matlock and Midlands Junction Railway, and Cromford Canal Leasing Act 1852
- Act of Parliament
- Parliament of the United Kingdom
- Long title: An Act for enabling the Manchester, Buxton, Matlock, and Midlands Junction Railway Company to lease their Undertaking to the London and North-Western and the Midland Railways Companies.
- Citation: 15 & 16 Vict. c. xcviii

Dates
- Royal assent: 17 June 1852

Text of statute as originally enacted

The Midland Railway had held shares in the line since it had been first proposed in 1845, its interest being an extension onto its route to London. The Manchester and Birmingham had for some time been looking for a route of its own, and had considered a line through the Churnet Valley (later built by the North Staffordshire Railway), but had instead supported the alternative Matlock route with a substantial shareholding. However, in 1846 it had merged with other lines to become the LNWR, which clearly could not contemplate a competing London line. In 1852 the two companies agreed to lease the line jointly for 19 years, In addition, the Midland would work the line and pay a rent on it, and also take over the Cromford Canal. This was authorised by the Manchester, Buxton, Matlock and Midlands Junction Railway, and Cromford Canal Leasing Act 1852 (15 & 16 Vict. c. xcviii).

== Rowsley to Buxton ==
In 1853, a junction was made to the southern end of the Cromford and High Peak Railway now LNWR-owned, at High Peak Junction, and with the latter's support, the Stockport, Disley and Whaley Bridge Railway connected Manchester to the northern end. In 1857, with the LNWR's barely concealed support, the SD&WBR then gained permission to extend to Buxton. It did so by a roundabout route along a massive escarpment to the east of the Goyt Valley, such that it could never become a through express route. Despite an LNWR petition against the bill and opposition from the SD&WBR, the Midland Railway (Rowsley and Buxton) Act 1860 (23 & 24 Vict. c. lxvi) of 25 May 1860 authorised a 15 miles (24 km) line from Rowsley to meet the SD&WBR at Buxton. Work started in September 1860, under Frederic Campion, the Midland Railway's Southern Division engineer, then under Alfred Andrew Langley (from 1883 Midland's Chief Engineer).

It was the first time the Midland Railway had built in such difficult terrain, with steep hills and deep valleys, Buxton itself being some 1,000 feet (300 m) above sea level. The line followed the River Wye as far as Bakewell, with the complication of the cut and cover Haddon Tunnel, and reached Hassop in 1862 There then followed two viaducts – at Millers Dale and Monsal Dale – and eight tunnels, reaching Buxton in 1863 at almost the same time as the LNWR reached it from Whaley Bridge. In 1884 John Ruskin complained of the effect on the dales, saying, "your railway drags its close clinging damnation".

All this time passengers were having to change at Ambergate, but in the same year, the Midland added a south-facing junction and moved the station to allow through travel from Derby and the south. However, there was still the problem of the joint control of the line.

For many years, the town of Wirksworth had been campaigning for a branch line from Duffield. The C&HPR was interested, but had insufficient funds. The Midland was initially unenthusiastic, but then realised that the branch could be extended to Rowsley, avoiding the section to Ambergate, being unsure about what might occur when joint lease expired in 1871.

However, the LNWR gave up its share of the line when the lease expired. It was, after all, remote and isolated from the company's main system. The Midland Railway was therefore relieved of the necessity of extending from Wirksworth over a very difficult piece of terrain. The branch opened to Wirksworth in 1867 but was not carried further.

== To Manchester ==
In the shifting alliances and rivalries between the various companies, the Manchester, Sheffield and Lincolnshire Railway also wished to keep the Midland away from the coalmines which it served and, in 1859, was planning a line from Hyde just outside Manchester to New Mills and Hayfield. The company was also being courted by the GNR that planned to run London trains through Retford. Meanwhile, the MS&LR's manager Edward Watkin had his own plans to reach London through Sheffield.

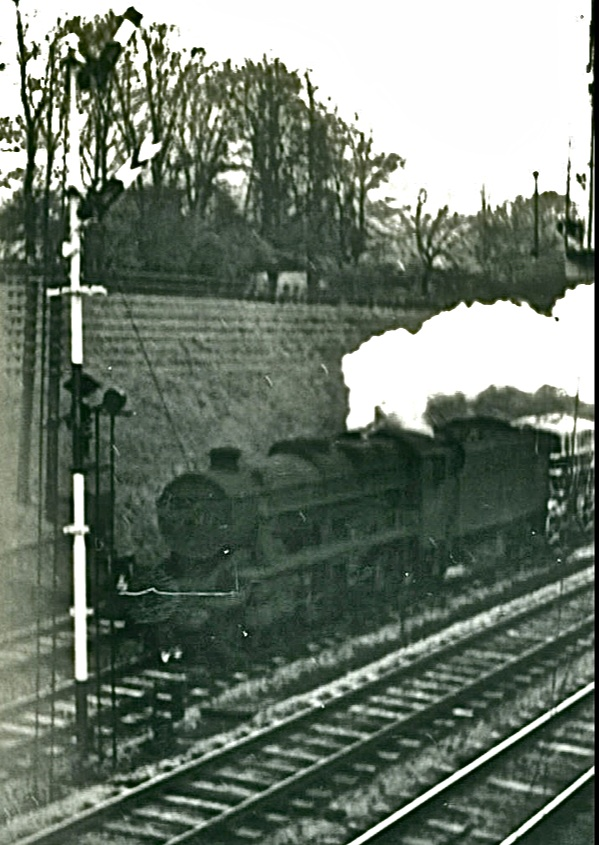
A cement train running west towards Chinley in 1964

It seemed the Midland's only chance was a circuitous route with the help of the Lancashire and Yorkshire Railway, except that it transpired that latter had an agreement with the LNWR not to handle other companies' trains. In 1861, the Midland sent their manager James Allport and some of the directors on a scouting trip around the area, and came by chance upon a party of MS&LR directors riding in a dog cart. The upshot was that Allport who had previously worked for the latter company should arrange a deal. Since it was clear that the Midland was determined to go ahead, it would be better not to have two lines running side by side.

On 7 November 1861 it was formally agreed therefore that the Midland would join the MS&LR partner's Marple, New Mills and Hayfield Junction line at New Mills, an agreement which was put into statutes, later including the Sheffield and Midland Railway Companies' Committee in the Manchester, Sheffield, and Lincolnshire Railway (Additional Powers) Act 1872 (35 & 36 Vict. c. clxxviii) of 6 August 1872.

To do this, it built a junction at Millers Dale, which effectively left Buxton on a branch. Thus railway politics deprived what was (particularly at that time) the largest town in the Peak District of a through main-line station. The Midland's line proceeded to the east of, but parallel to, the LNWR's line until it reached a summit at Peak Forest. It then plunged under the LNWR through Dove Holes Tunnel with stations at Chapel-en-le-Frith, Buxworth and Chinley joining the MS&LR at New Mills to run into Manchester London Road, opening in 1867. This section of route is still open for stone freight trains serving the Buxton lime industry as the Great Rocks Line.

== Later history ==
The Midland at last had its route into Manchester from London. Over the years it made some improvements. The route from Romiley through Hyde entailed a long detour, so in 1875 a new more direct line was opened through Reddish.

In 1865 the Midland had become a partner of the Cheshire Lines Committee which opened Manchester Central railway station in 1880. Therefore, the Midland transferred most of its trains there, at first reaching it through Stockport Tiviot Dale. However the route became increasingly congested and was hardly suitable as an express route, so in 1897, the Midland opened a new line from New Mills through Disley Tunnel and Heaton Mersey.

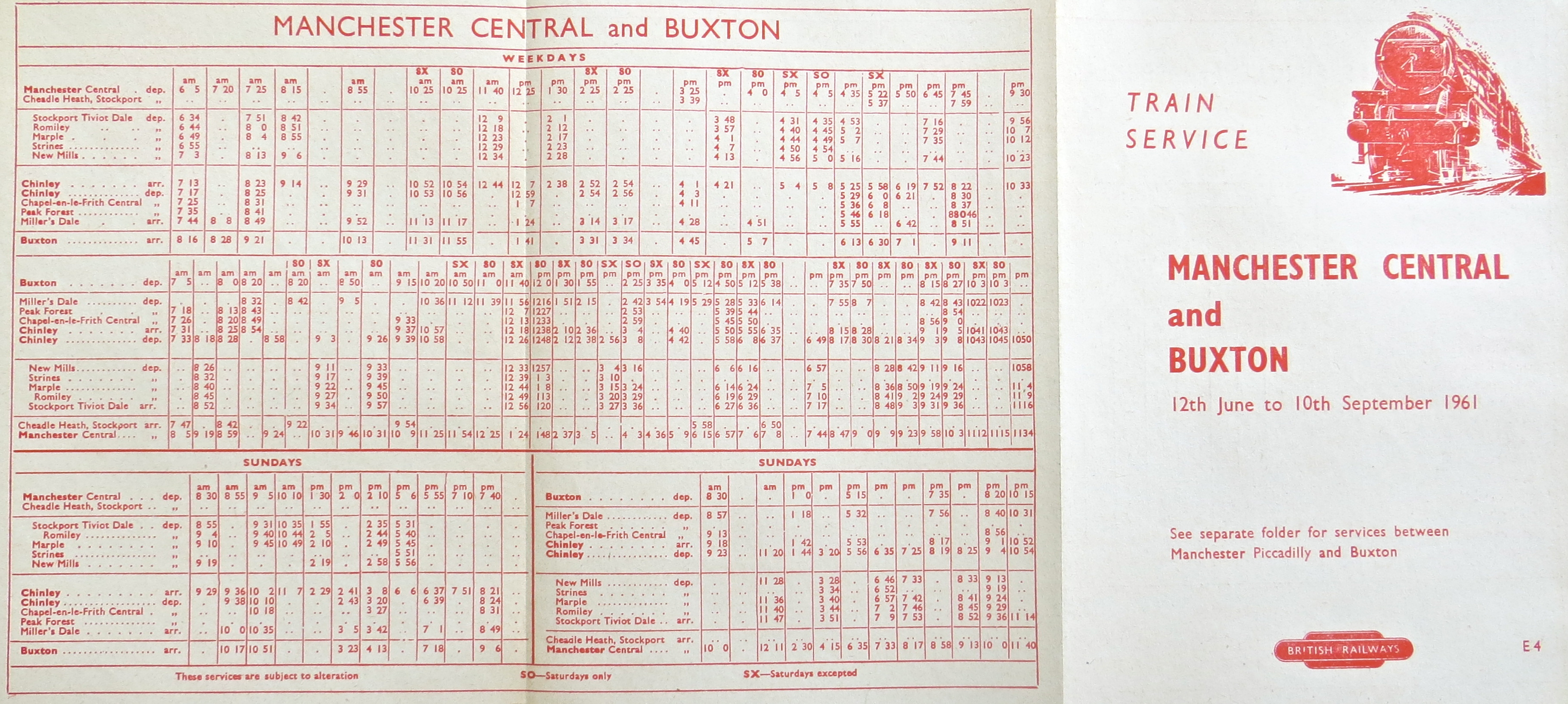
summer 1961 leaflet – on the reverse the Cheap Day Return fare between the terminals was shown as 5/2 (26p).

== Closure ==
The line from Matlock to Buxton was closed in June 1968 by the Labour Minister for Transport, Barbara Castle, not, as is often thought, by the Beeching reforms. Continuing support is being given by a heritage group Peak Rail who have restored the section from Matlock to Rowsley.

The line from Matlock to Ambergate, plus the section of the Midland Main Line to Derby, are now referred to as the Derwent Valley Line.

== Current status ==
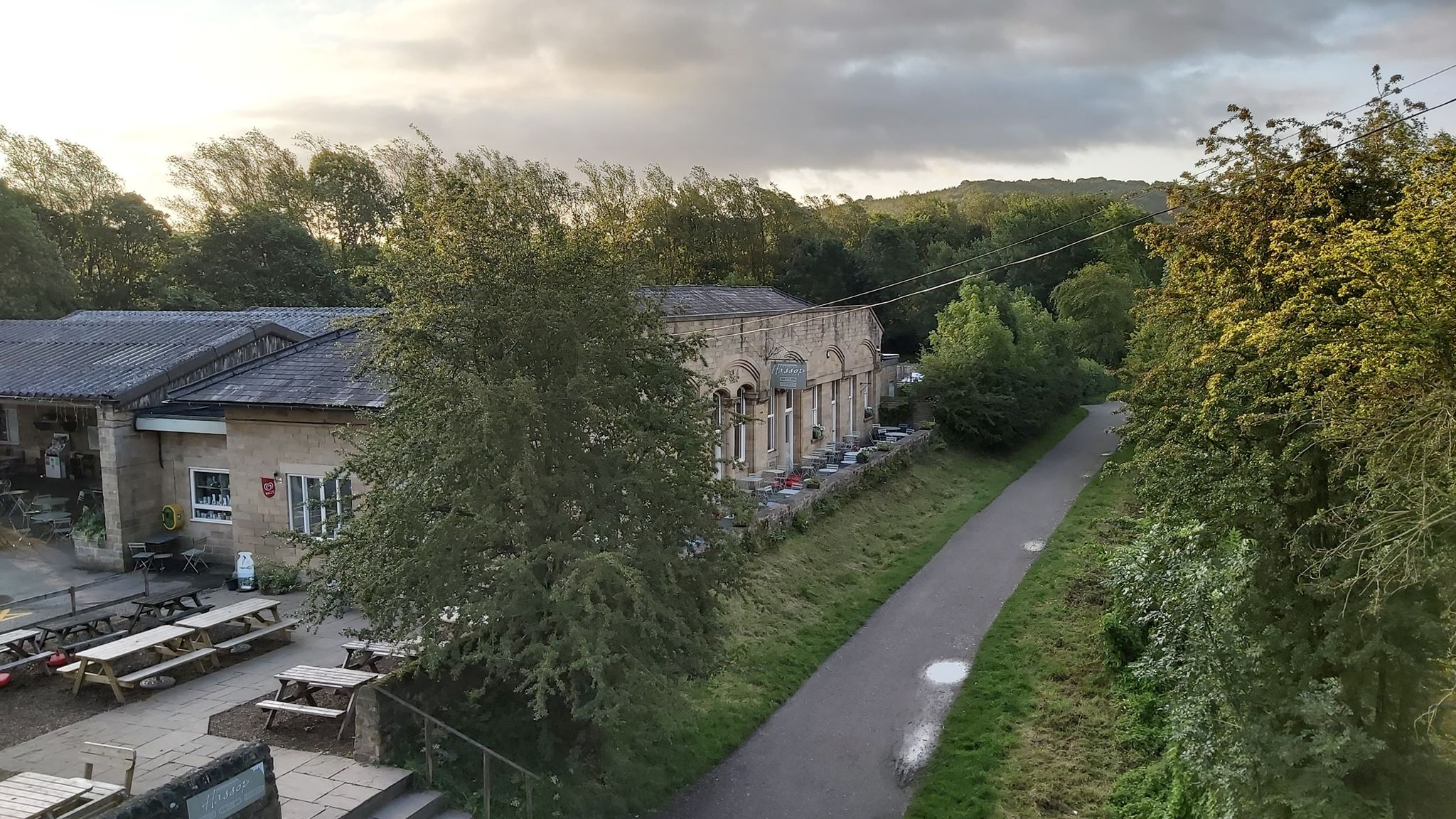
Hassop railway station in 2019

Although the track has been lifted between Rowsley and Buxton and is now part of the Monsal Trail, plans to re-open it are still proposed from time to time, and the Derbyshire County Council has pledged to keep the trackbed free of development.

Part of the line has been re-opened by the heritage railway organisation Peak Rail who run services from Matlock to Rowsley, at a current distance of 4 miles (6.4 km) in length.

There are plans to extend to Bakewell via the site of Rowsley railway station and a Proposed Haddon halt as part of the Buxton extension project. It will involve reinstating the whole section and Bakewell railway station to their former use once planning permission has been granted, plus full restoration of the old Haddon Tunnel and both Coombs Road and Rowsley Viaducts (along the way between both Bakewell and Rowsley themselves).

Four tunnels (Headstone, Cressbrook, Litton and Chee Tor) between Great Longstone and Peak Forest and Blackwell Mill were re-opened to walkers and cyclists in May 2011.

In March 2018, it was announced that a consortium of quarry companies and the heritage railway Peak Rail is investigating reopening the line between Matlock and Buxton. This section has been identified by Campaign for Better Transport as a phase 2 candidate for reopening.

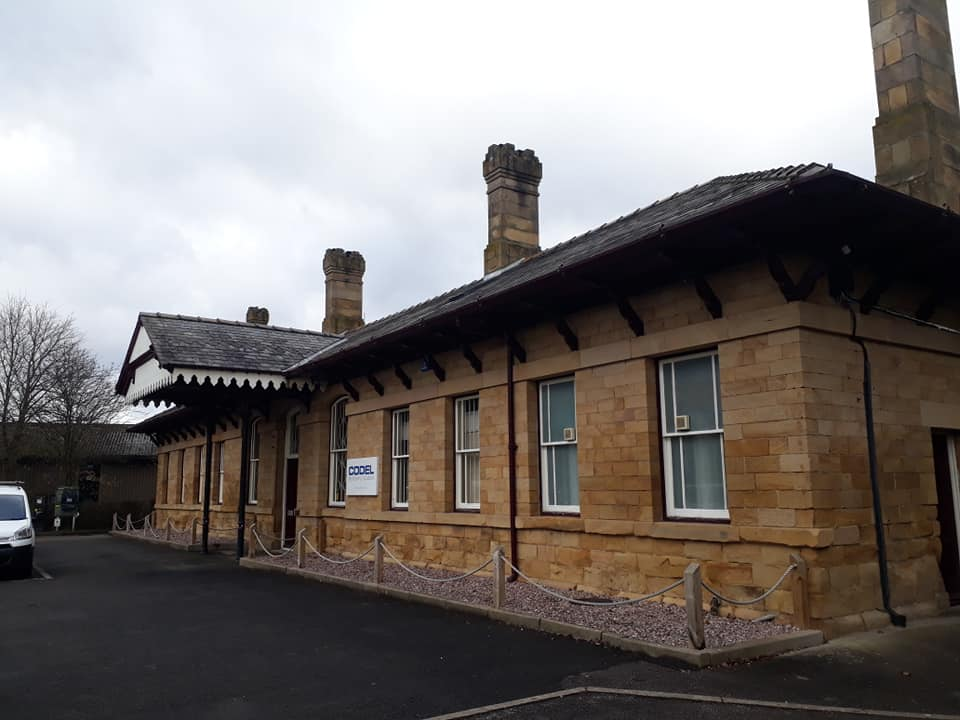
Bakewell station in 2019

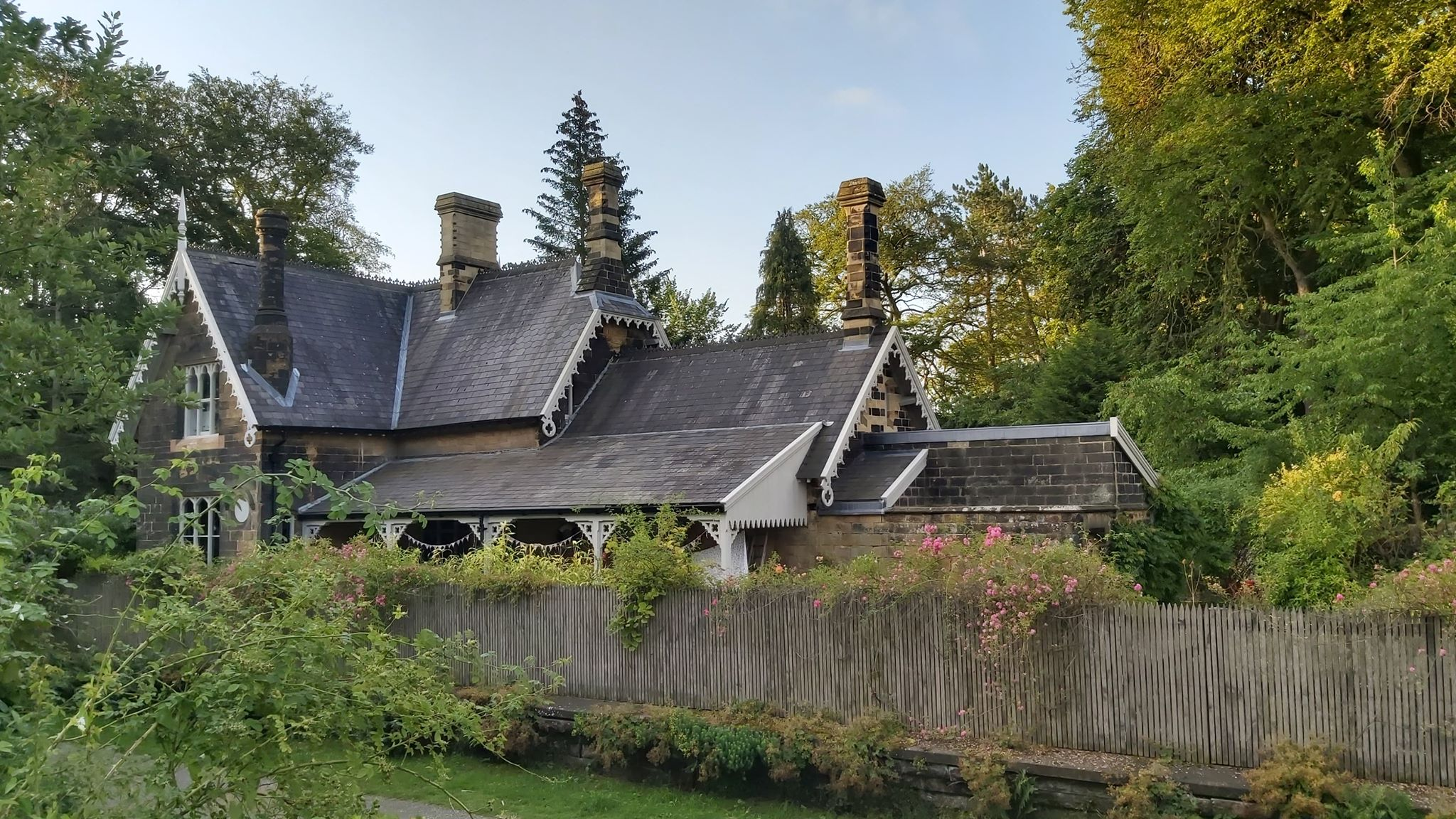
Great Longstone for Ashford station in 2019

In March 2020, a bid was made to the Restoring Your Railway fund to get funds for a feasibility study into reinstating the line between Matlock and Buxton. This bid was unsuccessful. In March 2021, the bid was re-submitted as part of the third round of the Restoring Your Railway fund.

In June 2022 it was announced that funding would not be allocated at this time.

The proposal to reinstate the railway, a campaign led by Manchester and East Midlands Rail Action Partnership (MEMRAP), continues to grow support. Working with the Promoter, Peaks and Dales Railway and supported by the Goodshelter Group, the plans include a re provisioned Monsal Trail as well as the return of the railway.

== See also ==
- Rail trail
