= High Edge =

Hill in the Derbyshire Peak District

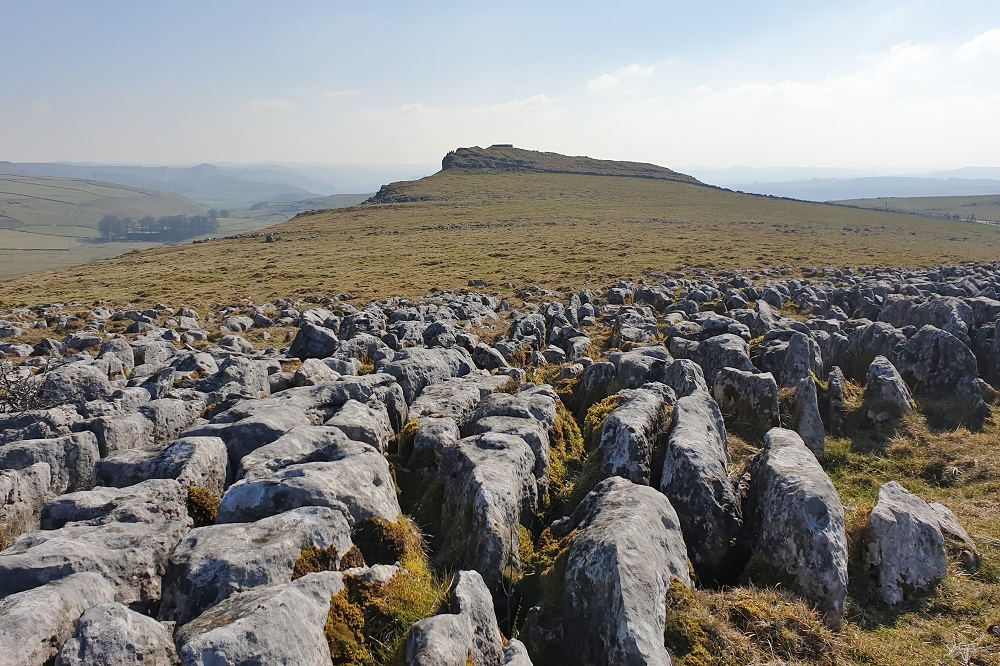
- Summit

Highest point
- Elevation: 472 metres (1,549 ft)
- Coordinates: 53°12′58″N 1°54′26″W

Geography
- Location: Buxton, Derbyshire, England
- OS grid: SK063688
- Topo map: OS Explorer OL24

High Edge is a limestone hill overlooking Harpur Hill, Buxton in Derbyshire, in the Peak District. The summit is 472 metres (1,549 ft) above sea level. The lower hilltop (about 400m north-west of the summit) is marked by a cairn.

Following the Countryside and Rights of Way Act 2000, this hilltop area became "Open Access" land for the public.

There are two machine gun bunkers on the hilltop as part of the defences of the former RAF Harpur Hill. From 1938 to 1969, the No. 28 Maintenance Unit RAF was based at Harpur Hill. The RAF site was established as an underground ammunitions store with an extensive tunnel system to house munitions and ordnance. The site is now operated by the Health and Safety Executive Laboratory, which has had a presence on the site since 1947, when it was the Safety in Mines Research Establishment (SMRE).

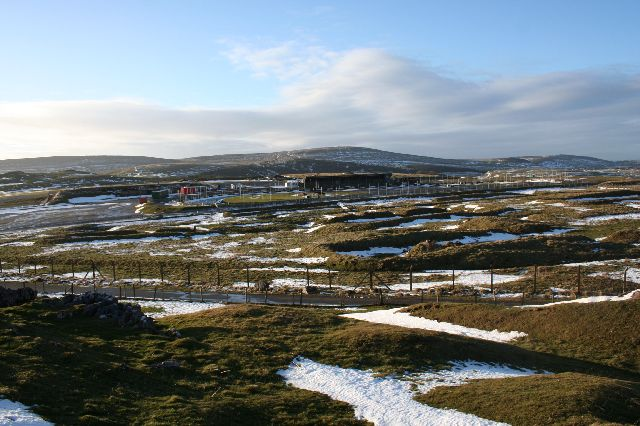
Buxton Raceway from High Edge

On the north-west side of High Edge is Buxton Raceway, a modern oval motorsport track. Racing started at the site in 1974 when it was known as 'High Edge'.
