= Peak Forest railway station =

Former railway station in Derbyshire, England

Peak Forest
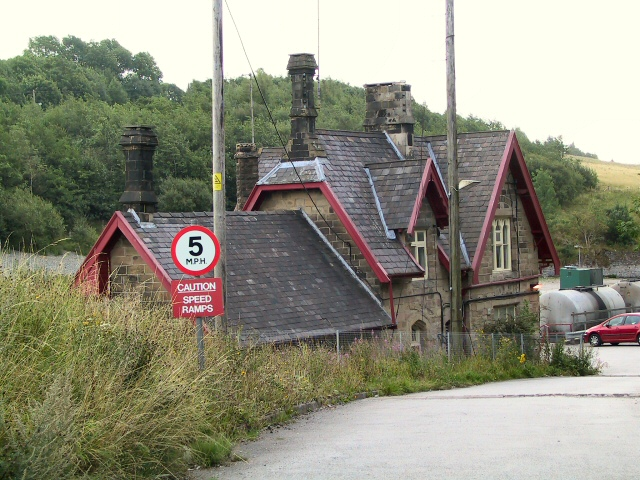

General information
- Location: High Peak; England
- Coordinates: 53.2873°N 1.8644°W
- Platforms: 2

Other information
- Status: Disused

History
- Original company: Midland Railway
- Post-grouping: London, Midland and Scottish Railway

Key dates
- 1 February 1867: Station opened
- 26 September 1893: Renamed Peak Forest for Peak Dale
- 14 June 1965: Renamed Peak Forest
- 6 March 1967: Station closed
Location

Peak Forest railway station served the small villages of Peak Dale, Smalldale and Peak Forest, in Derbyshire, England.

== History ==
Peak Forest station was opened in 1867 by the Midland Railway on its extension of the Manchester, Buxton, Matlock and Midlands Junction Railway from Rowsley; it was part of the main Midland Line from Manchester London Road to London St Pancras. It was also the northern junction for the line from Buxton and marked the summit of the line before it dropped through Dove Holes Tunnel to Chapel-en-le-Frith Central.

It closed in 1967 and the platforms were demolished shortly afterwards.

== The site today ==
This section of route is still open for stone freight trains serving the Buxton lime industry; it is known as the Great Rocks Line.

The northbound station building still survives, as offices which support the large quarry terminal close by. A short section of one platform has been reinstated for railway staff use. It is easily visible from the nearby road at Dove Holes.

Preceding station	Disused railways	Following station
Chapel-en-le-Frith Central; Line and station closed	Midland Railway; New Mills-Millers Dale line	Millers Dale; Line and station closed
Chapel-en-le-Frith Central; Line and station closed	Midland Railway; New Mills-Millers Dale line	Buxton (Midland); Line and station closed
