= Listed buildings in Wormhill =

Wormhill is a civil parish in the High Peak district of Derbyshire, England. The parish contains 26 listed buildings that are recorded in the National Heritage List for England. Of these, three are listed at Grade II*, the middle of the three grades, and the others are at Grade II, the lowest grade. The parish contains the village of Wormhill and the surrounding area. Most of the listed buildings are houses, cottages and associated structures, farmhouses and farm buildings. The other listed buildings include a church and associated structures, a village cross moved into the churchyard, a railway viaduct, and a memorial fountain.

== Key ==
Grade	Criteria
II*	Particularly important buildings of more than special interest
II	Buildings of national importance and special interest

== Buildings ==
Name and location	Photograph	Date	Notes	Grade
St Margaret's Church; 53.26450°N 1.81477°W		13th century	The oldest part of the church is the west end and the tower, the rest being rebuilt in 1864, and the transepts added in 1904–10. The church is built in limestone with gritstone dressings, some tufa at the west end, and slate roofs. It consists of a nave, a south porch, a chancel with north and south transepts and a sanctuary, and a west tower. The tower has four stages, it is unbutressed, and has a west window and smaller windows with trefoil heads, and a helm roof. The porch is gabled and has a doorway with a pointed arch, and the east window has three lights with Decorated glazing and a hood mould.	II*
Former village cross 53.26437°N 1.81485°W		Medieval|	The village cross, now in the churchyard of St Margaret's Church, is in gritstone. It consists of the stump of a shaft on a square base, on two steps. A sundial face dated 1670 has been fitted to the top of the shaft.	II
Old Hall Farmhouse; 53.26772°N 1.81891°W		16th to 17th century	The farmhouse is in roughcast limestone with gritstone dressings, quoins, and a stone slate roof with coped gables and moulded kneelers. There are two storeys and an L-shaped plan, consisting of a four-bay range, and a gabled cross-wing at the west end. The doorway has a chamfered quoined surround and a rectangular fanlight, and the windows are mullioned with five lights, those in the ground floor and east gable end with hood moulds.	II
Dakin Farmhouse; 53.27385°N 1.82303°W	—	1623	The farmhouse is in limestone with gritstone dressings, quoins and a stone slate roof. There are two storeys and an L-shaped plan, with a main range of four bays, and a gabled cross-wing on the northeast. The windows are mullioned, some with moulded surrounds, and some with hood moulds. The doorway has a plain surround, a dated lintel, and a bracketed flat hood, and above it are two square inscribed tablets.	II
Wormhill Hall; 53.26347°N 1.81467°W		1697	A small country house in gritstone, with quoins, and a roof with moulded copings and kneelers. There are two storeys and attics, and an H-shaped plan, consisting of a seven-bay range with a parapet, flanked by two-bay gabled cross-wings. In the centre is a doorway with a moulded surround and a segmental pediment. The windows are mullioned, and have cornices connected by string courses. The rainwater heads are dated and initialled, and at the rear is a stair tower.	II*
Range northwest of Wormhill Hall; 53.26367°N 1.81467°W	—	Early 18th century	An ancillary wing to the hall, it is in limestone with gritstone dressings, and a stone slate roof with a coped gable at the northwest end. There are two storeys and eight bays. On the front are three doorways with massive surrounds, and the windows are mullioned with two lights.	II
Chapelsteads Farmhouse; 53.26261°N 1.81374°W		Mid 18th century	The farmhouse is in roughcast stone with gritstone dressings, and a roof of stone slate and tile. There are two storeys and three bays. The windows are mullioned with added lights, and contain a mix of sashes and casements. The doorway has a plain surround.	II
Outbuilding south of Chapelsteads Farmhouse; 53.26212°N 1.81383°W		Mid 18th century	The outbuilding is in limestone with gritstone dressings and a stone slate roof. There are two storeys and eight bays. It contains seven doorways with massive frames, one blocked with an inserted window. In the upper floor is a square opening, and the south gable contains dovecote openings with perches.	II
Milne House; 53.25546°N 1.79434°W	—	Mid 18th century	The house is in limestone with gritstone dressings, rusticated quoins and a Welsh slate roof. There are two storeys and three bays, and an added bay at the west end with a stone slate roof. The doorway has massive jambs and lintel, and a shallow bracketed canopy. The windows are mullioned and contain two sashes.	II
Barn northwest of Old Hall Farmhouse; 53.26803°N 1.81940°W		Mid 18th century	The barn is in limestone with gritstone dressings, quoins and a tile roof. There is a T-shaped plan, with two storeys at the east end, and a single storey at the west end. The barn contains three doorways with quoined surrounds and heavy lintels, and there are two openings in the upper floor, one a taking-in door.	II
Cottage northeast of The Vicarage; 53.26504°N 1.81466°W	—	Mid 18th century	The cottage is in limestone with gritstone dressings, and has a roof of Welsh slate and stone slate with a coped southeast gable and moulded kneeler. There are two storeys and an L-shaped plan. Most of the windows are mullioned, and there are two fire windows.	II
Gate piers and walls, Wormhill Hall; 53.26330°N 1.81529°W	—	Mid 18th century	The gate piers flanking the entrance to the grounds are square, in gritstone, with projecting moulded caps and ball finials, and between them are wooden gates. Outside them are low curving walls with saddleback copings, linking with the boundary walls carrying timber fencing. These walls contain smaller piers, and two doorways with quoined surrounds.	II
Outer gate piers, Wormhill Hall; 53.26289°N 1.81653°W		Mid 18th century	The gate piers are square, in gritstone, and have moulded drips, projecting moulded caps, and ball finials. Between them are iron gates with spear-headed railings.	II
Stables and cottage northwest of Wormhill Hall; 53.26380°N 1.81541°W	—	Mid 18th century	The building is in limestone with gritstone dressings, quoins, and a stone slate roof with coped gables and moulded kneelers. There are two storeys, and it contains an archway with a quoined surround and a narrow arched head. This is flanked by blocked doorways, and in the upper floor are two rectangular openings. The cottage is at the north end, and there is an extension to the west.	II
Knotlow Farmhouse and outbuilding 53.26564°N 1.81628°W		Late 18th century	The farmhouse, which incorporates material from a 17th-century house, and the attached outbuilding, are in rendered limestone, and have stone slate roofs with a coped north west gable and moulded kneelers. The house has two storeys and three bays, and contains two doorways and sash windows. The outbuilding to the right has a single storey and an overloft, a single bay, and a doorway.	II
Barn south-southeast of Knotlow Farmhouse; 53.26538°N 1.81606°W	—	Late 18th century	The barn is in limestone with gritstone dressings, quoins and a stone slate roof. There are two storeys and ten bays. In the centre is a full-height segmental-arched cart entrance with a quoined surround, and there are three doorways, also with quoined surrounds.	II
Barn west of Old Hall Farmhouse; 53.26785°N 1.81986°W		Late 18th century	The barn is in limestone with gritstone dressings, quoins and a stone slate roof. There are two storeys and five bays, and it contains five doorways with plain lintels.	II
The Vicarage; 53.26493°N 1.81485°W		Late 18th century	The vicarage is in limestone, roughcast on the garden front, with gritstone dressings, rusticated quoins, a moulded eaves band, and a slate roof. There are two storeys and three bays. In the centre is a canted bay window, and the other windows are sashes. On the east gable end is a single-storey porch.	II
Hassop Farmhouse; 53.26251°N 1.81694°W		c. 1800	The farmhouse is in roughcast limestone with gritstone dressings, and a Welsh slate roof with coped gables and moulded kneelers. There are two storeys and three bays. The doorway has a plain surround and a shallow bracketed hood, and the windows are sashes.	II
House east of Bateman's Farm; 53.26602°N 1.81681°W		Early 19th century	The house, at one time a farmhouse and an inn, is in limestone with gritstone dressings, rusticated quoins, and a stone slate roof. There are two storeys, three bays, and a two-bay parallel range at the rear. In the centre is a doorway with a shallow bracketed hood, and the windows are sashes.	II
Elm Tree House; 53.26735°N 1.81708°W		Early 19th century	The house is in roughcast limestone with gritstone dressings, quoins, an eaves band, and a hipped Welsh slate roof. There are two storeys and three bays. The central doorway has a semicircular head, Gothic glazing bars, and a shallow bracketed hood. The windows are sashes, the window above the doorway with a semicircular head.	II
Gate piers and walls, St Margaret's Church; 53.26480°N 1.81558°W	—	Mid 19th century	The boundary walls enclosing the churchyard are in limestone. At the entrance are square gritstone gate piers with projecting moulded caps and cone finials on tapered stems.	II
South Viaduct; 53.25578°N 1.79205°W		1862–63	The viaduct was built by the Midland Railway to carry its line over the River Wye. The piers and abutments are in limestone with gritstone dressings, and the superstructure is in wrought iron. It consists of three round-arched masonry spans to the west and three wrought iron spans to the east, about 80 feet (24 m) above the ground. Each arch consists of five parallel ribs with latticework strutting filling the spandrels.	II*
Brindley Memorial Fountain; 53.26513°N 1.81733°W		1875	A well in gritstone as a memorial to the civil engineer James Brindley. The fountain head is gabled and has carved copings. It contains seating, it is surrounded by steps and stepped walls, and in front of it are three stone troughs.	II
Outbuilding south-southeast of the House east of Bateman's Farm; 53.26591°N 1.81662°W		Late 19th century	The outbuilding is in limestone with quoins and a stone slate roof. There are two storeys and three bays. The windows have heavy stone frames, those in the ground floor with segmental-arched heads. In the upper floor is a taking-in door, and an inserted inscribed and dated plaque.	II
Outbuilding southwest of the House east of Bateman's Farm; 53.26579°N 1.81676°W		Late 19th century	The outbuilding is in limestone with gritstone dressings and a stone slate roof. There are two storeys and three bays. It contains a full-height cart entry with a quoined surround and a segmental-arched head, blocked and containing an inserted doorway with a quoined surround. There are two ground floor windows with quoined surrounds, and two upper floor openings with plain stone frames.	II
