= Dove Holes Tunnel =

Railway tunnel in Derbyshire, England

Coordinates: 53.30790°N 1.89641°W

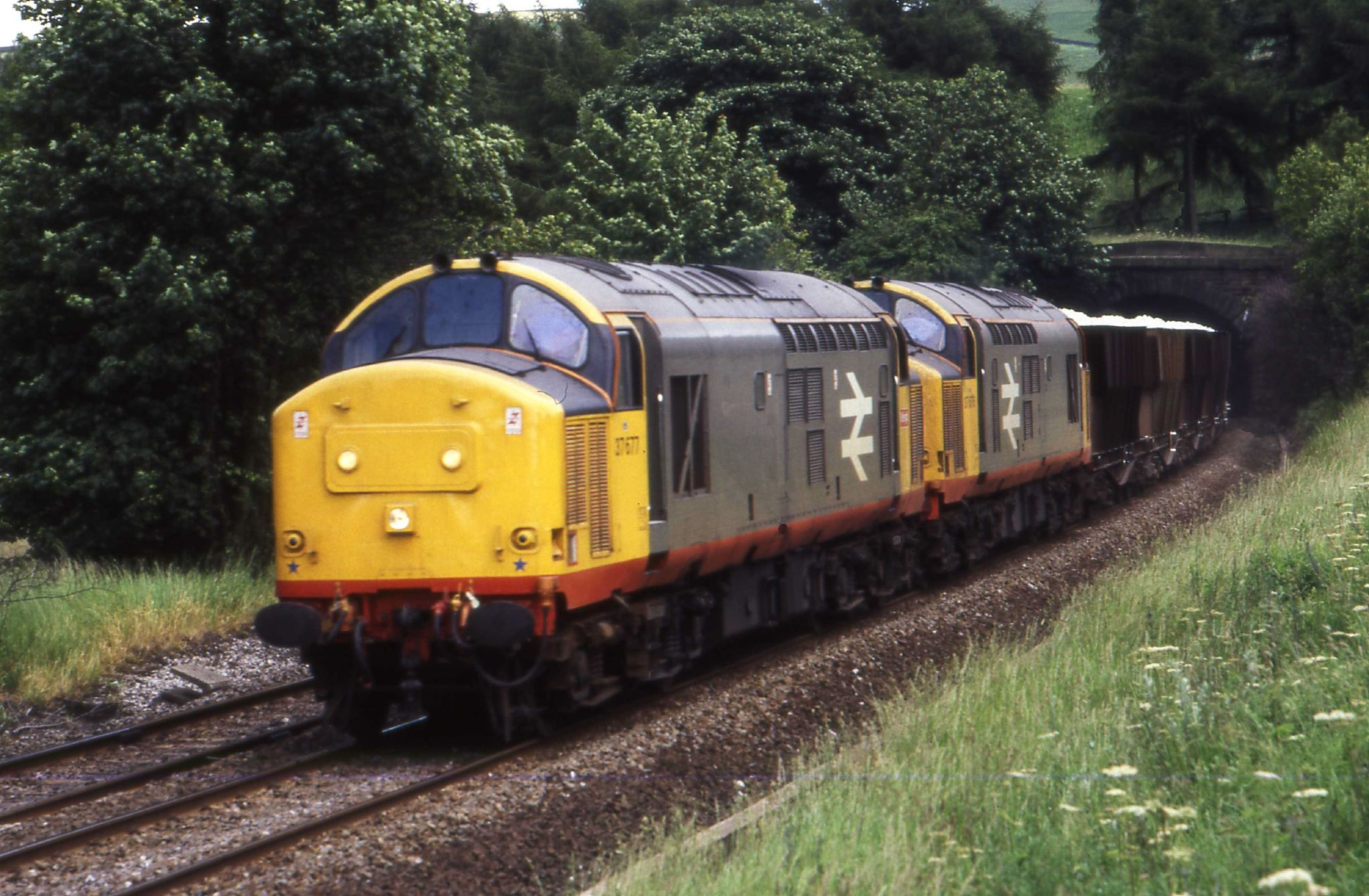
Train leaving Dove Holes Tunnel

Location of the tunnel within the Peak District

Dove Holes Tunnel is a tunnel built by the Midland Railway between Peak Forest Signal Box and Chapel-en-le-Frith in Derbyshire in 1860–64, now carrying the Great Rocks Line.

In the mid-nineteenth century, the Manchester, Buxton, Matlock and Midlands Junction Railway was jointly leased by the LNWR and Midland Railway, and ran as far as Rowsley. The Midland wished to extend to Manchester to give it a service to London but the LNWR, having its own London line, declined. It then supported the Stockport, Disley and Whaley Bridge Railway in building a line from Whaley Bridge to Buxton, one which the Midland considered unsuitable as a main line, due to its steep gradients over Cow Low.

In the end, however, the Midland came to an agreement with the Manchester, Sheffield and Lincolnshire Railway that was formalised as the Sheffield and Midland Railway Companies' Committee. The Midland would extend its line to New Mills to meet a line the MS&LR was building from its main line out of Manchester.

The Midland constructed a junction on its Buxton line at Peak Forest Signal Box which ran under Dove Holes in a tunnel 2,984 yards (2,729 m) long, some 183 feet (56 m) beneath the LNWR line. The entrance was at the summit of the line, nearly 1,000 feet (300 m) above sea level, and descended nearly a hundred feet at a gradient of 1 in 90.

== Construction ==
Begun in 1860, it took five years to build. The navvies lived where they could, in huts or crevices in the rock. Six pumping stations were needed to keep the workings clear of water, an underground river being encountered at one stage. This was diverted but burst through again. On being diverted a second time, a local curiosity, the Barmoor Clough "Ebbing and Flowing Well", partially dried up.

Being on the edge of the Derbyshire White Peak the tunnel was partly though gritstone and partly through limestone, which gave considerable problems. In 1872 it partially collapsed and again in 1940.

== Problems ==
Beside the frequent expresses, it was heavily used by goods trains. As has been mentioned, there was a considerable uphill gradient in the southbound direction. Moreover, several trains may have been held in the loop before it, to allow an express to pass. By the time two or three had gone through, all accelerating hard, one could cut the smoke with a knife. The crew of a following goods train at around 10 mph (16 km/h), would have to crouch down with handkerchiefs over their faces. Meanwhile, they had to hold the speed steady enough not to cause wheelslip, and not to snatch the train, causing a coupling to break, which would strand them in the fume-laden darkness.

Apart from damp rails, it was extremely hot in summer, while, in winter, long icicles would form from the roof. The first engine through in the morning would break them off (the crews staying well inside the cab), but when diesels came into use there were a number of broken windscreens. After one driver suffered serious injury the Buxton snowplough was fitted with ice clearing equipment. The heavy traffic took its toll on the tunnel lining. On one occasion a locomotive emerged with a pile of bricks on top of its firebox. In June 1954, after 90% of the brickwork was found to need attention, a major project was started to reline the tunnel. About 1.4 million new bricks were used and some existing brickwork and stonework was mechanically repointed using the 'Aerocem' process. The work was carried out by 60 to 80 men working five nights per week and completed in November 1956.

== Present day ==
Since the line to Rowsley closed in 1967 the tunnel has remained in use for stone freight trains serving the Buxton lime industry as the Great Rocks Line.

In 2004 the Derbyshire County Council carried out a feasibility study into reopening the line from Rowsley, in which its recommendations were split between running directly to New Mills, reinstating the tunnel as a passenger line, or running into Buxton and using the ex-LNWR line, which would mean reversing the train.

At the end of 2011, major work was undertaken to correct the structural clearances that had been disrupted over the years. The track renewed, the drainage cleared and the gauge works were undertaken.
