= Hargate =

Hargate may refer to:

== People ==
Hargate is an English surname. Notable people with this surname include:

- Araya A. Hargate (born 1981), Thai actress, model, host, TV personality
- Bill Hargate (1935–2003), American costume designer
- Lynn Evans Mand (born Carolyn Marie Hargate, 1924–2020), American singer, member of The Chordettes
- Karen Hargate (born 1972), British gymnast

== Places ==
=== England ===
- Fleet Hargate, village in Lincolnshire
- Hampton Hargate, neighborhood in Hampton, Peterborough
- Hargate Wall, hamlet in Derbyshire
