= Hargate Wall =

Hamlet in Derbyshire, England

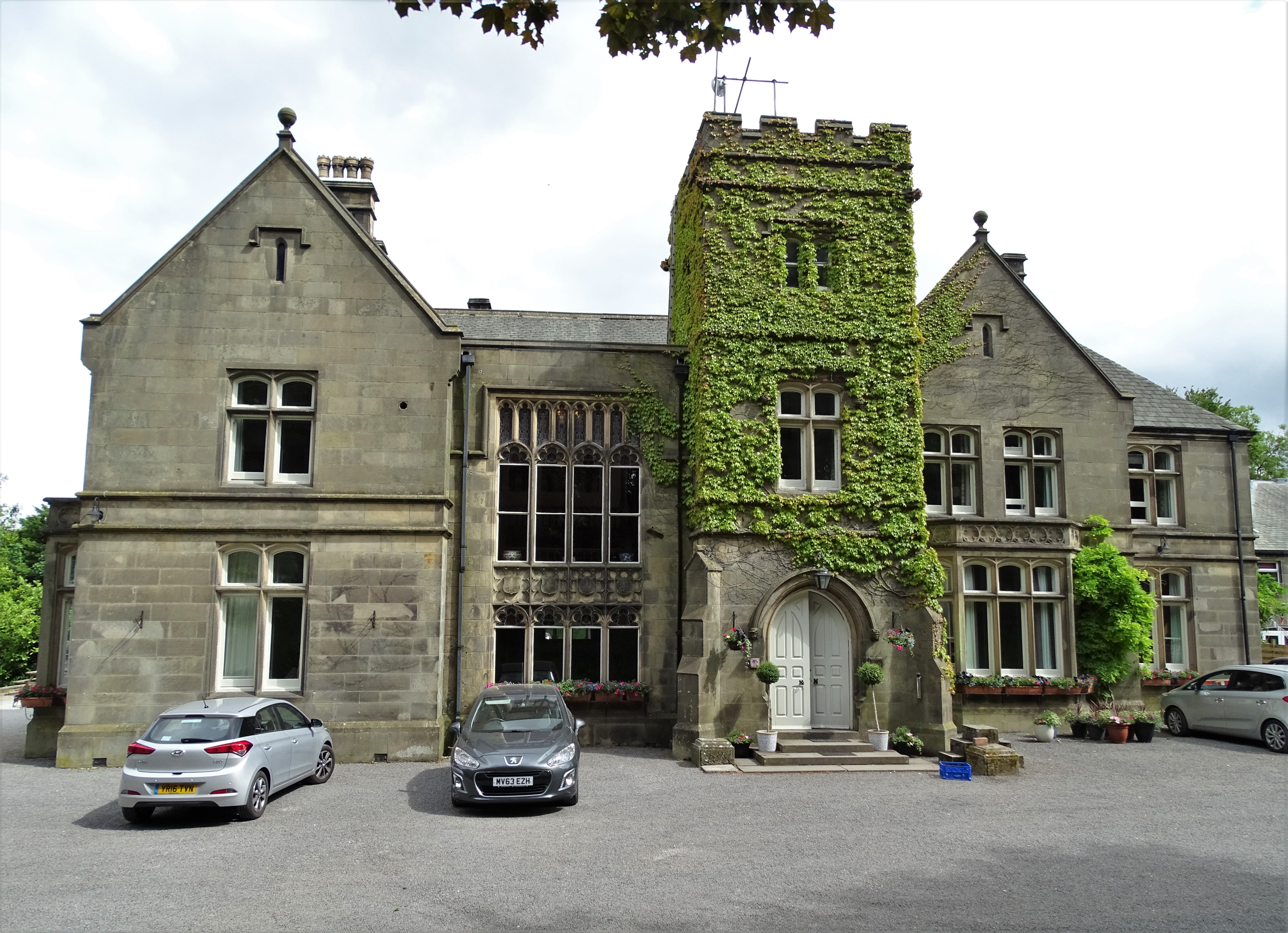
- Hargate Hall

- Location within Derbyshire
- OS grid reference: SK118752
- Civil parish: Wormhill
- District: High Peak
- Shire county: Derbyshire
- Region: East Midlands
- Country: England
- Sovereign state: United Kingdom
- Post town: BUXTON
- Postcode district: SK17
- Police: Derbyshire
- Fire: Derbyshire
- Ambulance: East Midlands

Hargate Wall is a hamlet in the civil parish of Wormhill, in the High Peak district, in Derbyshire, England, situated northeast of Buxton.

The name Hargate Wall derives from Old English Herdwyk-waella, meaning "herd farm by the spring", so the first settlement was probably around AD 700–950.

The hamlet now consists of several cottages, farms and property called Hayward Farm and Hargate Hall (completed and lived in by Robert Whitehead).

On the edge of Hargate Wall is a Neolithic barrow known as Wind Low (53.2733°N 1.8299°W). Excavations have revealed the remains of a Neolithic chieftain and his family, a female member of a Celtic tribe and a Celtic necklace which is now in the Weston Park Museum in Sheffield.
