= Chapel-en-le-Frith Central railway station =

Former railway station in Derbyshire, England

Chapel-en-le-Frith Central
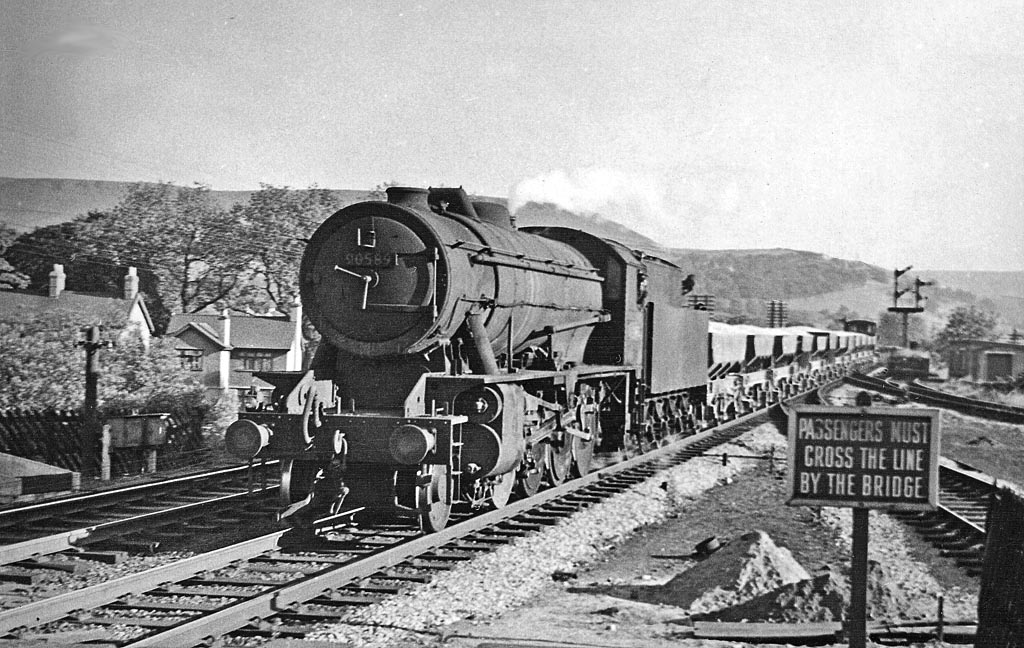
- Down ballast train at the station

General information
- Location: Chapel-en-le-Frith, High Peak; England
- Coordinates: 53.3245°N 1.9196°W
- Grid reference: SK054808
- Platforms: 2

Other information
- Status: Disused

History
- Original company: Midland Railway
- Pre-grouping: Midland Railway
- Post-grouping: London, Midland and Scottish Railway

Key dates
- 1 February 1867: Opened as Chapel-en-le-Frith
- 2 June 1924: Renamed Chapel-en-le-Frith Central
- 6 March 1967: Closed
Location

Chapel-en-le-Frith Central railway station was an intermediate stop on the Derby–Manchester line of the Midland Railway. It served the Derbyshire town of Chapel-en-le-Frith between 1867 and 1967.

== History ==
The station was opened by the Midland Railway (MR) on 1 February 1867.

At the start of 1923, the MR amalgamated with several other railways to form the London, Midland and Scottish Railway (LMS), which inherited two stations at Chapel-en-le-Frith; to distinguish the ex-MR station from the ex-London and North Western Railway station, the former was renamed Chapel-en-le-Frith Central on 2 June 1924.

The station was closed on 6 March 1967.

This section of route is still open for stone freight trains serving the Buxton lime industry as the Great Rocks Line, with the station building converted into a DIY centre.

=== Stationmasters ===
- Samuel Rayson c. 1871 – 1873 (afterwards station master at Hyde)
- W. Webster 1873–1876 (formerly station master at Whatstandwell, afterwards station master at Calverley)
- J. Hudston 1876–1879 (formerly station master at Monsal Dale)
- J. Blower 1879–1880 (formerly station master at Finedon, afterwards station master at Didsbury)
- David Daw 1880–1919 (formerly station master at Haworth)

| Preceding station | Disused railways | Following station |
|---|---|---|
| Chinley; Line closed, station open | Midland Railway | Peak Forest; Line and station closed |
| Edale; Line closed, station open | Midland Railway | Peak Forest; Line and station closed |
