= Peak Dale =

Village in Derbyshire, England

Coordinates: 53.289°N 1.863°W

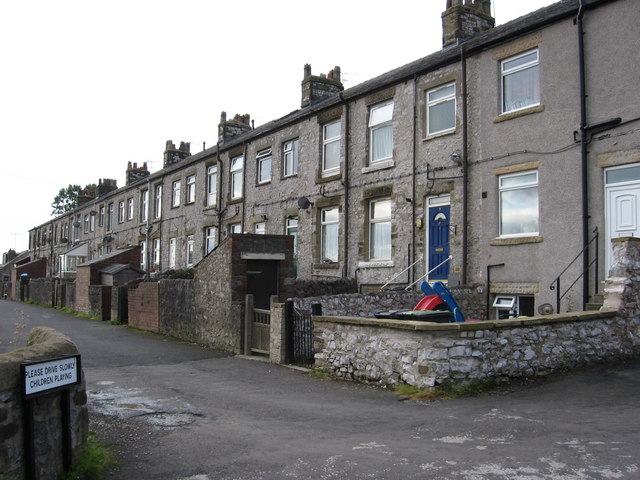
- Terraced housing in Peak Dale

- Location within Derbyshire
- OS grid reference: SK092769
- District: High Peak
- Shire county: Derbyshire
- Region: East Midlands
- Country: England
- Sovereign state: United Kingdom
- Post town: BUXTON
- Postcode district: SK17
- Police: Derbyshire
- Fire: Derbyshire
- Ambulance: East Midlands

Peak Dale is a small village in Derbyshire, England, 3 miles (4.8 km) northeast of Buxton and 1.3 miles (2.1 km) southeast of Dove Holes. The population falls within the civil parish of Wormhill & Green Fairfield.

The village is between Dove Holes Quarry (to the north) and Tunstead Quarry (to the south), with other smaller quarries in the vicinity. It was built to house quarry workers and their families, but some of the original houses have now been demolished. The village has a club (Great Rocks Club), sports fields (Peak Dale Recreation Ground), a bowling green, a playground and a primary school.

Great Rocks Dale lies immediately south of the village.

== Railway ==
The village previously had a railway station called Peak Forest railway station, on the Midland Railway line, which closed when passenger services were withdrawn. However, the station building survives as offices for the adjacent quarry as does the line through the station, which is now known as the Great Rocks Line. A footpath known colloquially as 'the Boardings' is frequented by train enthusiasts as it offers views of the railway line that serves the quarries and heritage tours.
