= Rhenish helm =

Type of Romanesque church spire architecture

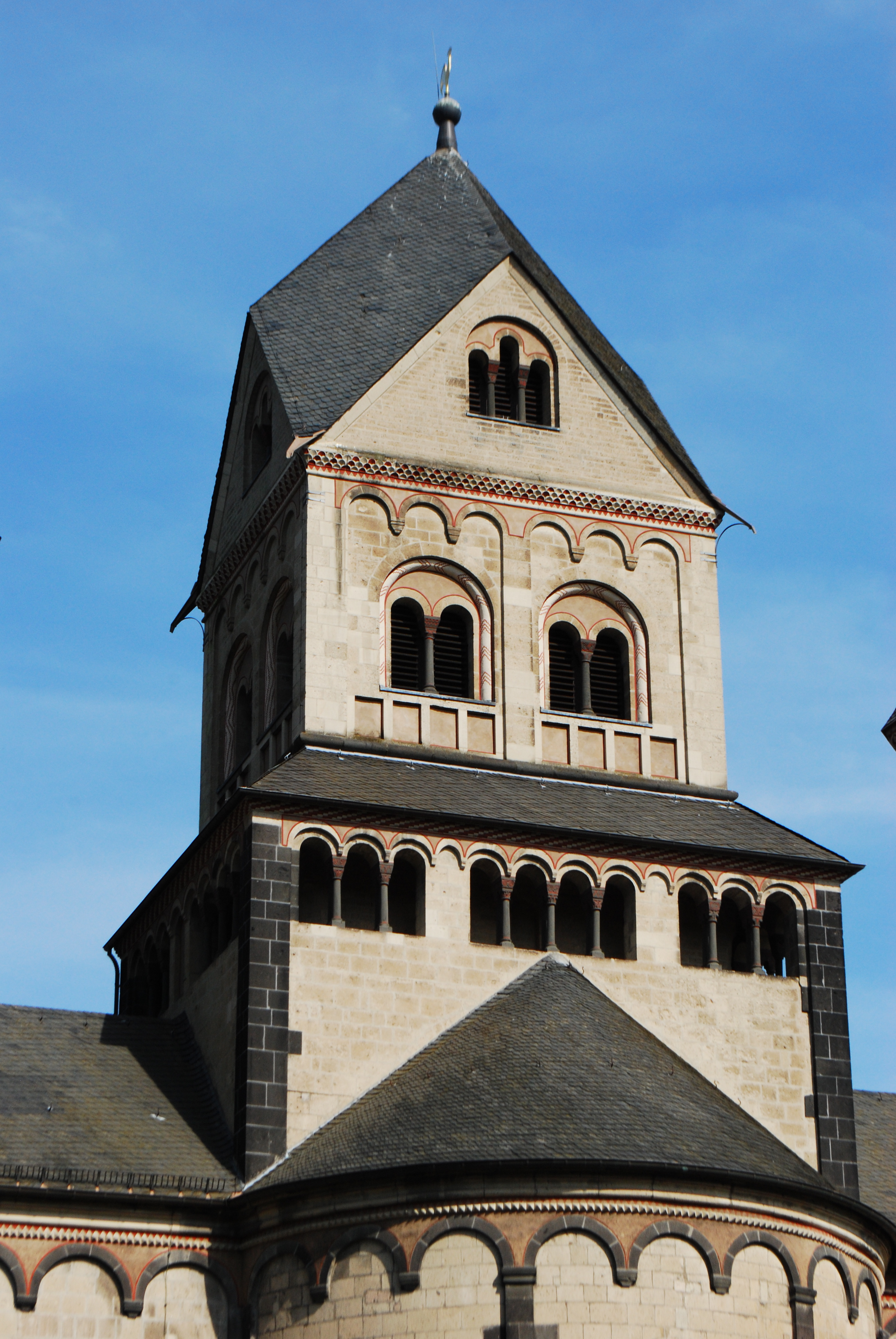
Rhenish helm on Maria Laach Abbey

The Rhenish helm (German: Rheinischer Helm) is a type of spire typical of Romanesque church architecture of the historic Rhineland.

It is a pyramidal roof on towers of square plan. Each of the four sides of the roof is rhomboid in form, with the long diagonal running from the apex of roof to one of the corners of the supporting tower. Each side of the tower is topped with an even triangular gable from the peak of which runs a ridge to the apex of the roof. Thus, the corners of the pyramidical roof do not correspond with the corners of the tower but with the peaks of the gables.

An early if not the first example of such spires can be found on the four tall towers of the Cathedral of Speyer. Rhenish helm spires are mainly found in the historical Rhineland but there are a few churches in other areas with such spires.

== Examples of churches in the historical Rhineland ==
- Speyer Cathedral
- Maria Laach Abbey, near Andernach
- Basilica of St. Castor, Koblenz
- Collegiate Church of St. Bartholomew, Liège
- Limburg Cathedral
- St. Dionysius, Rhens
- Munsterkerk, Roermond
- St. Faith's Church, Sélestat
- Basilica of the Holy Apostles, Cologne
- St. Maria Lyskirchen, Cologne
- St. Aegidius Church, Bad Honnef
- Eibingen Abbey

== Examples of churches outside of the historical Rhineland ==
=== Germany ===
- St. Mary's Church, Lübeck
- Stumm-Kirche, Brebach-Fechingen, Saarbrücken

=== The Netherlands ===
- Basilica of Our Lady, Maastricht

=== Canada ===
- Moravian Church, Nain, Newfoundland and Labrador
- Saint Peter's and Saint John's Anglican Church, Baddeck, Nova Scotia
- Trinity Anglican Church, Jordan Falls, Nova Scotia

=== China ===
- St. Michael's Cathedral, Qingdao

=== England ===
- Church of St Mary the Blessed Virgin, Sompting, West Sussex
- St Margaret's Church, Wormhill, Derbyshire
- St Mary's Church, Flixton, Suffolk
- St Peter and St Paul, Hawkley, Hampshire
- St Stephen's Church, West Bowling, Bradford, West Yorkshire
- St Andrew's Church, Churcham, Gloucestershire
- St Anne's Church, Bowden Hill, Wiltshire

=== Hungary ===
- Abbey Church of St James, Lébény
- Mary Magdalene Church, Egregy, Hévíz

=== Denmark ===
- Ribe Cathedral

=== The United States ===
- Old Chapel (Amherst, Massachusetts)

== Further examples ==
- Preußisches Regierungsgebäude, Koblenz
- Temple Neuf, Metz
- https://www.geograph.org.uk/photo/3852199
- https://www.sussexexpress.co.uk/news/mysterious-and-magnificent-lewes-home-market-1109789?amp
