= Old Dam =

Hamlet in Derbyshire, England

Coordinates: 53.314°N 1.829°W

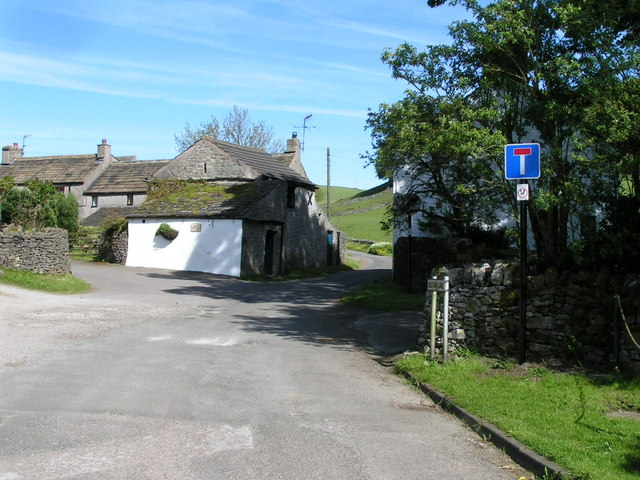
- Old Dam Lane

- Location within Derbyshire
- OS grid reference: SK114796
- District: High Peak
- Shire county: Derbyshire
- Region: East Midlands
- Country: England
- Sovereign state: United Kingdom
- Post town: BUXTON
- Postcode district: SK17
- Police: Derbyshire
- Fire: Derbyshire
- Ambulance: East Midlands

Old Dam is a hamlet in Derbyshire, England. It is located 3 miles (4.8 km) south-west of Castleton on the edge of the village of Peak Forest.
