= Great Rocks Dale =

Dry valley used for quarrying in the Derbyshire Peak District

Coordinates: 53.266°N 1.849°W

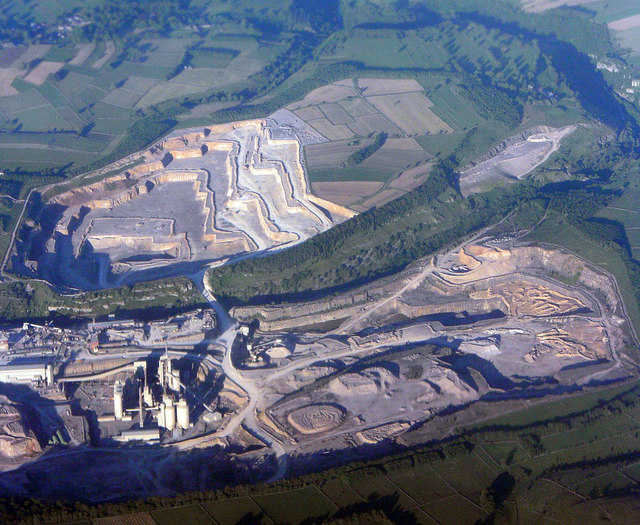
Tunstead Quarry, divided by the remains of Great Rocks Dale

Great Rocks Dale is a dry valley in the Derbyshire Peak District, known for its extensive quarrying.

== Geography and geology ==
The valley runs from Peak Dale down to Blackwell Mill at Chee Dale on the River Wye.

The scenery is of limestone, which extends to a depth of around 380 metres. It contains the only dikes in the White Peak. Boreholes have enabled the extraction of significant amounts of water, used by local industry.

Before the quarrying, the southern part of the valley was described as "narrow, flat-bottomed, rocky... [with] almost perpendicular cliffs of limestone on either side...", whereas the northern part was broader and grassy.

== History ==
The dale fell within the bounds of the mediaeval Forest of High Peak. The surrounding land was first farmed in about 1250, by people connected with the nearby hamlet of Tunstead.

In 1867, an extension of the Manchester, Buxton, Matlock and Midlands Junction Railway was opened, running through the valley between Peak Forest and Millers Dale. This section of line remains open, for freight traffic, now known as the Great Rocks Line after this area.

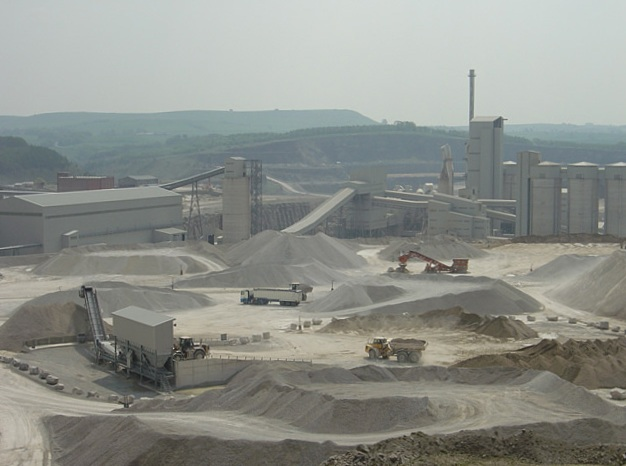
Tunstead Quarry

The valley is now dominated by Tunstead Quarry, a large limestone quarry, worked since 1929. Given its economic importance, the boundary of the Peak District National Park was carefully drawn to exclude the dale. By 1973, Tunstead was the largest quarry in Europe, and permission to extend it into the National Park was rejected on the grounds that there was sufficient stone to last until at least 2000. Following a Public Inquiry and a High Court case, the Secretary of State ultimately overrode the National Park Authority's decision and granted permission for a 148.57-hectare (367.1-acre) extension within the Peak District National Park. It remains the largest producer of limestone in the Peak District, with about 5.5 million tonnes extracted each year.

In 1932, quarrying opened a fissure which contained remains of bison, Irish elk and deer, washed down from the surface in the distant past. In 1957, the painter Peter Lanyon visited the valley to study the faces of the quarry, seeing them as revealing both the geological and human history of the area.

== See also ==
- Buxton lime industry
