= Harpur Hill Quarry =

Disused limestone quarry in Derbyshire, England

Harpur Hill Quarry Lagoon
- The quarry's lagoon in May 2012

- Location within Derbyshire
- Location: Harpur Hill
- Coordinates: 53.2336°N 1.9043°W
- Lake type: artificial
- Primary inflows: groundwater
- Primary outflows: evaporation, seepage
- Basin countries: England
- First flooded: c. 2005
- Max. length: 308 ft (94 m)
- Average depth: 2 m (6 ft 7 in)
- Max. depth: 3 m (9.8 ft)
- Settlements: King Sterndale, Buxton

Harpur Hill Quarry is a disused limestone quarry on Harpur Hill, Derbyshire, England. Limestone was extracted there from 1835 to 1952 for lime burning at lime kilns to produce quicklime. The quarry was used by the Royal Air Force (as part of RAF Harpur Hill) as a chemical weapons storage depot during the Second World War, the largest such depot in the United Kingdom. Afterwards a number of captured German chemical munitions were disposed of at the site by burning, which was only partially successful. The RAF depot closed in 1960 and the site is now vacant.

A small part of the abandoned quarry has flooded to become a quarry lake. Its water has a very high pH, that is, it is very alkaline, owing to the presence of caustic chemicals that are leaching from the waste left from the lime burning. The lake water has a vivid blue colour due to the scattering of light by finely dispersed particles of calcium carbonate. Despite signs warning of the health risks the lake became a popular tourist destination and swimming spot. The local High Peak Borough Council dyed the water black in 2013, 2016 and 2020 in an attempt to deter swimmers.

== History ==
The site near Harpur Hill, south of Buxton, was worked as a limestone quarry. Small-scale lime burning had taken place near Harpur Hill since at least the 1600s, initially around Grin Low near Poole's Cavern to the north, using lime kilns to produce quicklime by calcinating the limestone (mainly Bee Low Limestones) quarried nearby (that is, heating calcium carbonate to produce calcium oxide). A site beside the quarry was used for large-scale lime production from around 1835 to around 1952, using larger shaft kilns and then a multi-chambered Hoffmann kiln, operated by Buxton Lime Firms Ltd (later Brunner Mond from 1918, and then ICI from 1926). The Hoffmann lime kiln was demolished in 1980 to create space for an industrial estate. Large volumes of solid waste from the lime burning were dumped in tips nearby, creating spoil heaps contaminated with traces of quicklime and with ash from the coal used in the process. Water percolating through the waste leaches calcium hydroxide and becomes alkaline.

The site was taken over by the Royal Air Force (RAF) in 1938 for use as a depot (RAF Harpur Hill) for the storage of chemical weapons. Poor weather delayed construction and the depot did not become operational until 1940.

During the Second World War it was the largest chemical weapons storage depot in the country, covering some 500 acres (2.0 km^{2}).

After the war the site was occupied by an RAF unexploded ordnance disposal unit, known as an X station, and used for storage and disarmament of captured German chemical weapons and V-rocket warheads. The RAF disposed of chemical weapons, including mustard gas and phosgene, by burning the substances with bleach on the surrounding hills. This proved unsustainable, as large quantities of smoke were produced and the destruction was incomplete. Some mustard gas escaped as a vapour and much of the nearby vegetation was killed. The site also housed an RAF Mountain Rescue team who attended air crashes across Derbyshire. The RAF depot closed down in 1960.

== Blue lagoon ==
A quarry lake, officially known as Hoffman Quarry but also known as the Blue Lagoon, at the site became a tourist attraction owing to its vivid turquoise-blue coloration. It has attracted visitors from across the country. The colour derives from the scattering of light by small particles of calcium carbonate that are precipitating within the water. The caustic quicklime dissolved in the water gives it a pH level of 11.3 (by comparison bleach has a pH of 12.3).

Signs at the site state the water can cause "skin and eye irritations, stomach problems and fungal infections such as thrush" and that the quarry is known to contain car wrecks, dead animals, excrement and rubbish. The water is also extremely cold. Despite this the lake continued to be a popular destination visited by hundreds of people.

Around 750 local people, concerned about the health risks, signed a petition to have the quarry drained and closed off. However the water was deemed too toxic to drain, as it would risk contaminating local water supplies.

In order to deter swimmers the water was dyed black in 2013 by High Peak Borough Council, who acted after being unable to get in touch with the site's owner. The dye wore off by 2015 and the water returned to a blue coloration. The council redyed the lake in 2016 with a stronger mixture, but by October 2019 it showed signs of returning to a blue colour. In March 2020 the lake was dyed again following reports of people gathering there despite social distancing instructions issued by the British government to combat the COVID-19 pandemic. It was redyed by High Peak Borough Council and Derbyshire Fire and Rescue on 29 May after people flocked to the site for the bank holiday weekend (25 May). The police also coned off potential parking spaces in Harpur Hill. With people continuing to visit the site local farmers attempted to deter them by spreading pig and cow slurry across the surrounding land on 19 June 2020. Dying ceased in 2024 but following a resurgence in visitors during the May 2026 heatwave, the council announced that it would resume the practice.

== Incidents ==
Derbyshire Police found the body of a 44-year-old man at the quarry on 18 February 2019. The death was found not to be suspicious.

On 29 September 2019 two firefighters from Staffordshire Fire and Rescue Service were injured whilst carrying out rope rescue training at the quarry. One of them was hospitalised with life-changing injuries.

== See also ==
- Buxton lime industry
