= Wormhill =

Village in Derbyshire, England

Coordinates: 53.271°N 1.820°W

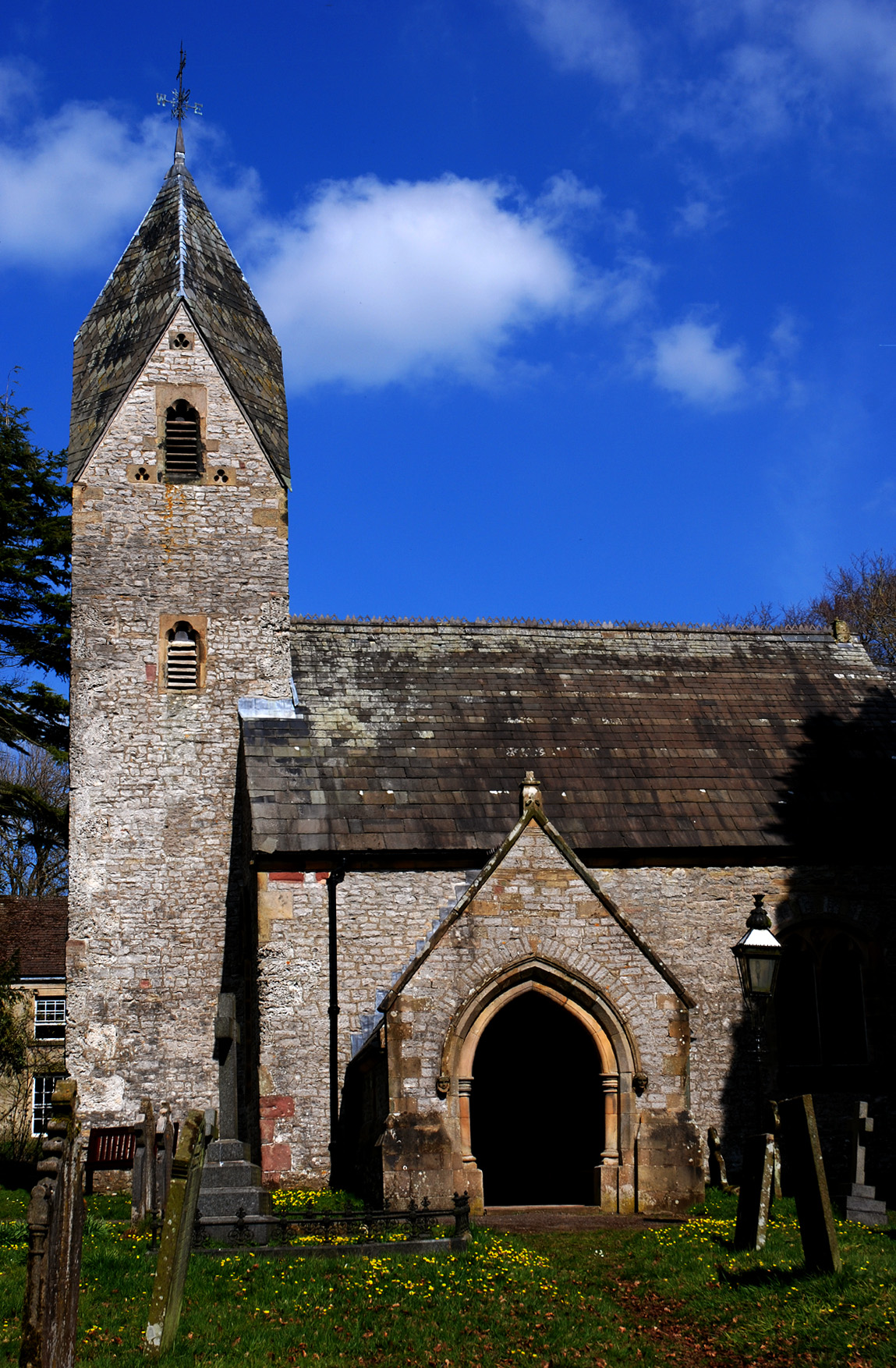
- St Margaret's Church, Wormhill

- Location within Derbyshire
- Population: 1,020 (2011)
- OS grid reference: SK121749
- District: High Peak
- Shire county: Derbyshire
- Region: East Midlands
- Country: England
- Sovereign state: United Kingdom
- Post town: BUXTON
- Postcode district: SK17
- Police: Derbyshire
- Fire: Derbyshire
- Ambulance: East Midlands

Wormhill is a village and civil parish in the High Peak district of Derbyshire, England, situated east by north of Buxton. The population of the civil parish including Peak Dale was 1,020 at the 2011 Census.

Wormhill was mentioned in the 1086 Domesday Book as belonging to Henry de Ferrers and containing 20 acres (81,000 m^{2}) of meadow. The name is said by the English Place-Name Society to be derived from the Old English 'Wyrma's hyll'.

There was a tradition of wolf hunting in Wormhill in the fourteenth century. It was said that a living was made by some and that an annual tribute of wolfheads was shown. It has been reported that the last wolf killed in England was at Wormhill Hall in the 15th century.

From 1863 to 1967 the village was served by Millers Dale railway station, some 2 miles away, which was on the Midland Railway's extension of the Manchester, Buxton, Matlock and Midlands Junction Railway. The disused railway line is now the Monsal Trail bridleway. A footpath south of the village leads to the nearby River Wye in Chee Dale. The Peak District Boundary Walk runs past Wormhill on its way from Buxton to Peak Forest.

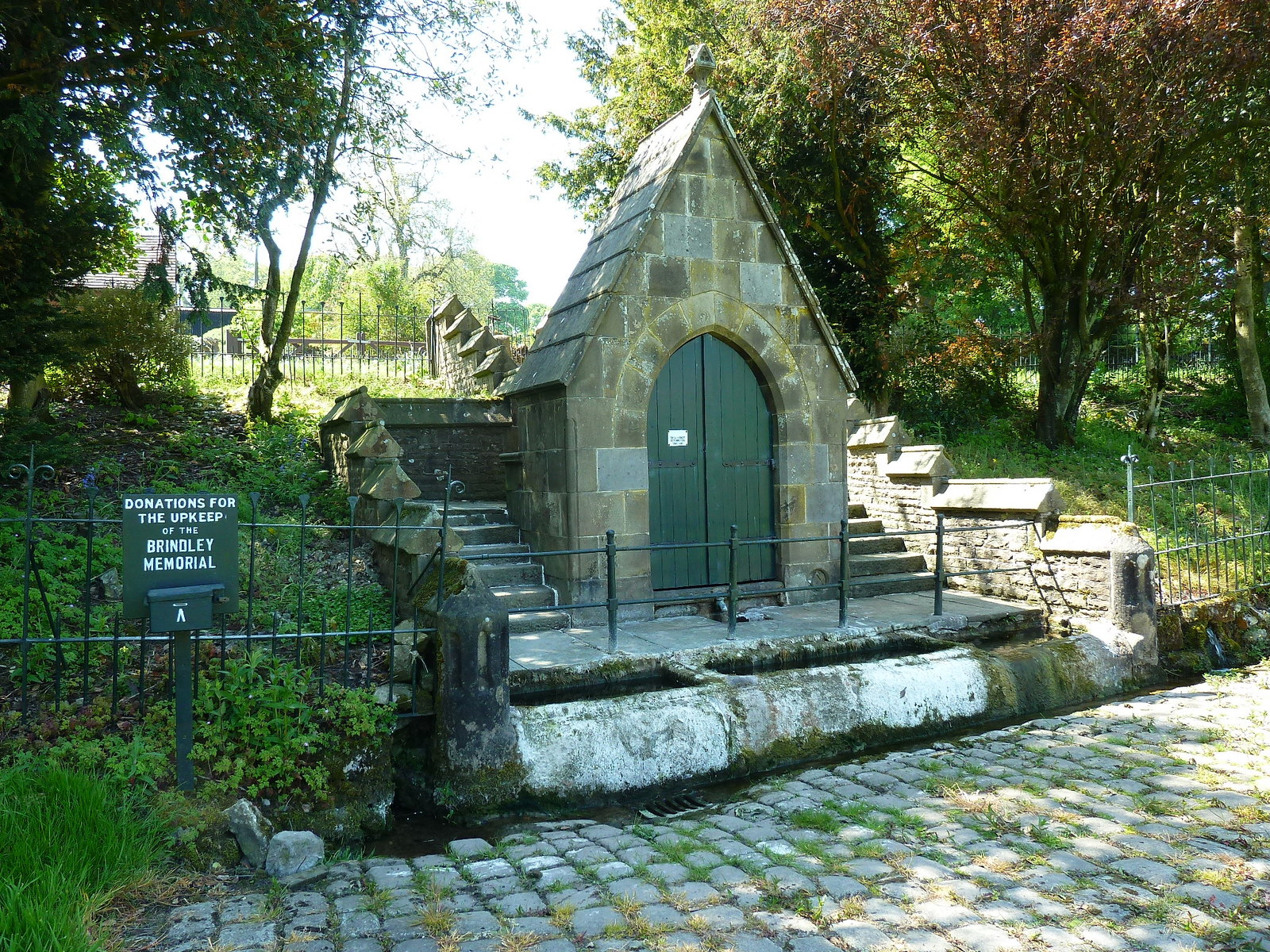
James Brindley Memorial

It has memorials to James Brindley, pioneer builder of Britain's canals, who was born in 1716 in the hamlet of Tunstead within Wormhill parish. The well in Wormhill is dedicated to Brindley. As part of the annual well dressing festival the Brindley well is decorated each year and there is also a smaller well dressing in the churchyard of St Margaret's Church in the village. The lower part of a cross shaft and its stepped base stand in the churchyard. A sundial dated 1670 tops the broken shaft. Only the base of the church tower is medieval; the rest of the church was "almost rebuilt" in 1864, and a transept added in 1904–10.

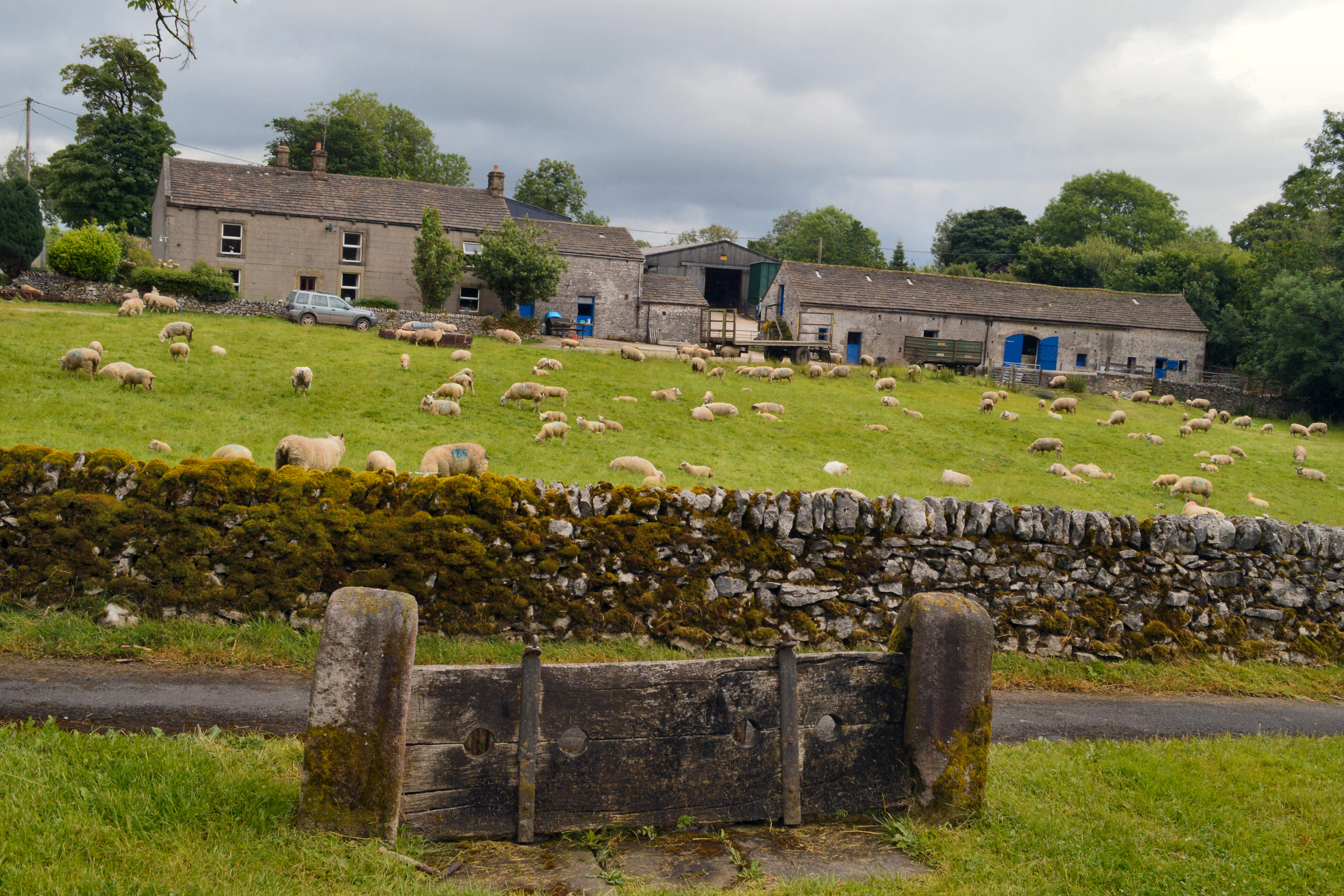
Old village stocks

Near the church and Brindley's well can be found the old village stocks. At the north end of the village lies the hamlet of Hargate (now part of Wormhill), where the industrialist Robert Whitehead and notorious mill owner Ellis Needham once lived.

== See also ==
- Listed buildings in Wormhill
