= Wormhill Hall =

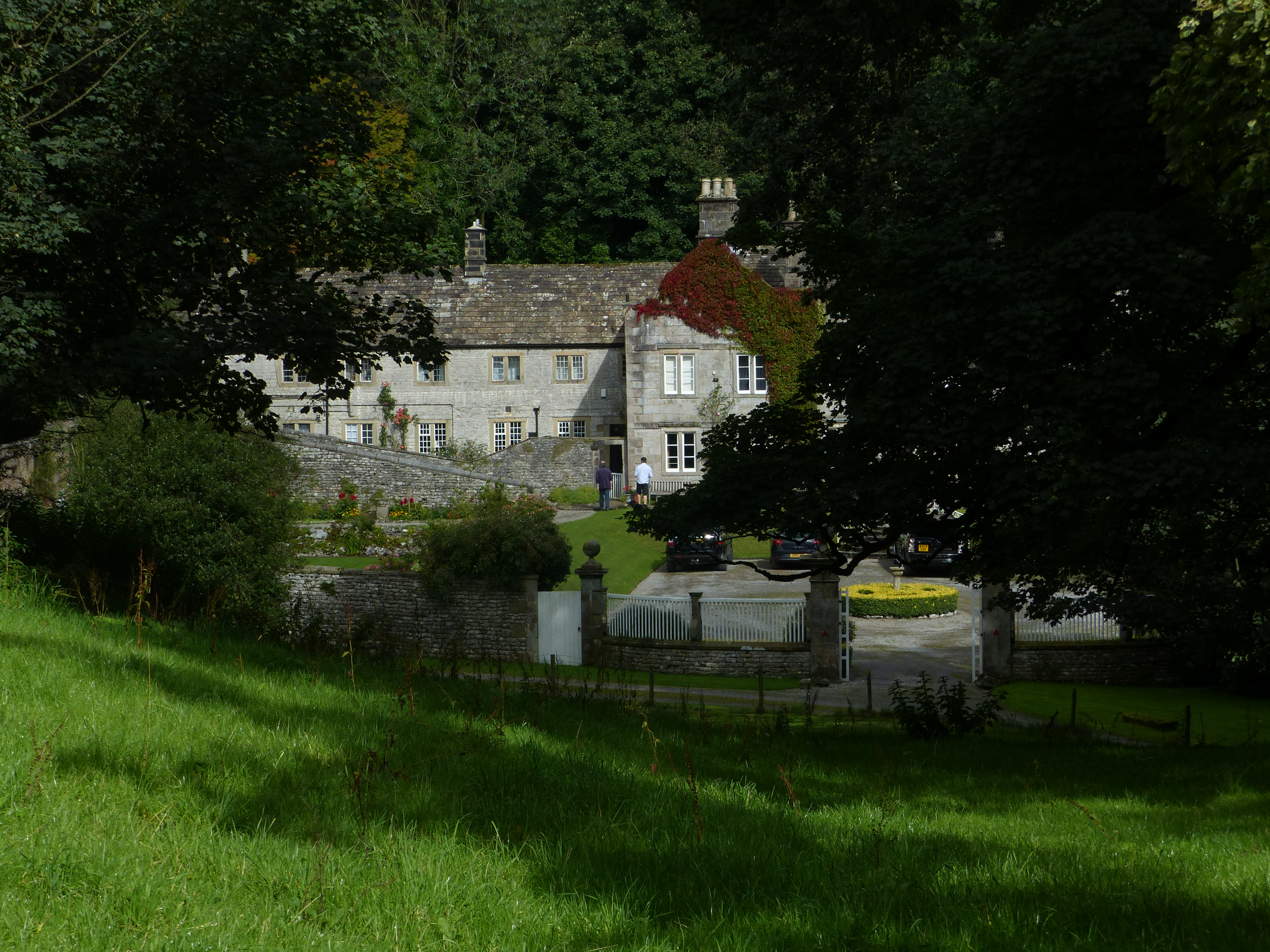
- Wormhill Hall

- Location in Derbyshire
- 53°15′49″N 1°48′53″W
- Location: Wormhill, Derbyshire, England

Listed Building – Grade II*
- Official name: Wormhill Hall
- Designated: 25 October 1951
- Reference no.: 1146377

Wormhill Hall is a 17th-century grade II* listed country hall in Wormhill, Derbyshire.

== History ==
The current Wormhill Hall was constructed in 1697 for Adam Bagshawe (1646–1723). The Bagshawe family had owned the Manor of Wormhill since the 15th century, and Adam's brother William Bagshaw resided at nearby Ford Hall.

Adam Bagshawe resided at the hall with his wife Alice Torr of Goosehill Hall, Castleton, upon his death, the hall was left to their son Adam Bagshawe (1673–1729). Adam died shortly following his father, and the hall was left to his brother Richard Bagshawe. The hall remained with the Bagshawe family.

The range is separately Grade-II listed.

== See also ==
- Listed buildings in Wormhill
