= RAF Harpur Hill =

Former Royal Air Force base

RAF Harpur Hill
- Near Harpur Hill, Derbyshire in England

Site information
- Type: Royal Air Force station
- Owner: Ministry of Defence
- Operator: Royal Air Force

Location
- Shown within Derbyshire RAF Harpur Hill (the United Kingdom)
- Coordinates: 53.233°N 1.919°W

Site history
- Built: 1938
- In use: 1939–1960

Airfield information
- Elevation: 400 metres (1,312 ft) AMSL

RAF Harpur Hill is a former Royal Air Force station, situated at Harpur Hill near Buxton, Derbyshire in England. The site was operational from 1938 to 1960 and was mainly used as an underground munitions storage facility. It became the largest ammunitions dump in the country across the 500 acres (200 ha) site.

== History ==
During World War I, Frith artillery range was located on the site. In 1938 the Air Ministry bought Harpur Hill Quarry from ICI. A total of 11 tunnels were built (concrete galleries covered by waste quarry stones) and dug into the hillside from 1938 to 1940 by McAlpine (at a cost of £6,500,000) to house munitions (ammunition and weapons) and ordnance (bombs and explosives) during World War II. The small entrance leads into one main tunnel, which used to have a railway track running along its length, with three side tunnels branching off on each side. These tunnels are 25 feet (7.6 m) wide, 17 feet (5.2 m) high and over half a mile long. The tunnels were constructed 60 feet (18 m) below ground level to withstand enemy bombing raids. There are four slightly smaller tunnels on a lower level, accessed by lifts. War food rations were also stored within the tunnel system. Bombs were transported to the site by road and by the mainline railway through the site (a branch of the Cromford and High Peak Railway).

From December 1939 to December 1960, No. 28 Maintenance Unit RAF was based at Harpur Hill. A bomb disposal unit was also based at the site in the post-war period. The RAF UXO (Unexploded Ordnance) unit, known as an X station, was used to store and disarm captured German ordnance, including V-rocket warheads. The RAF disposed of chemical weapons, including mustard gas and phosgene, by burning them with bleach on the surrounding hills. This generated large volumes of toxic fumes, which killed off much of the surrounding vegetation.

The large bomb store built in 1939 at RAF Llanberis in Wales was modelled on the underground tunnel design at RAF Harpur Hill.

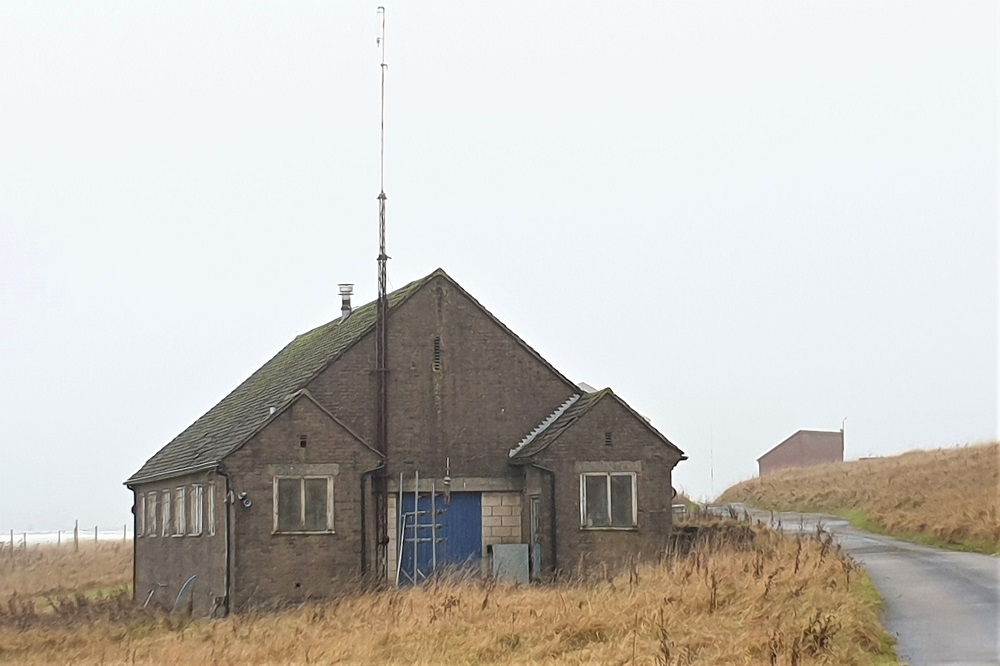
Building from the old RAF camp

The original wartime RAF camp at Harpur Hill was a top secret facility and was heavily defended. The camp's housing for staff was built nearby on roads named after past RAF war heroes (such as Nettleton, Tedder and Trenchard). A new site was constructed lower down the hill after the war. Bombs continued to be stored underground during the 1950s. The RAF base was closed in 1961.

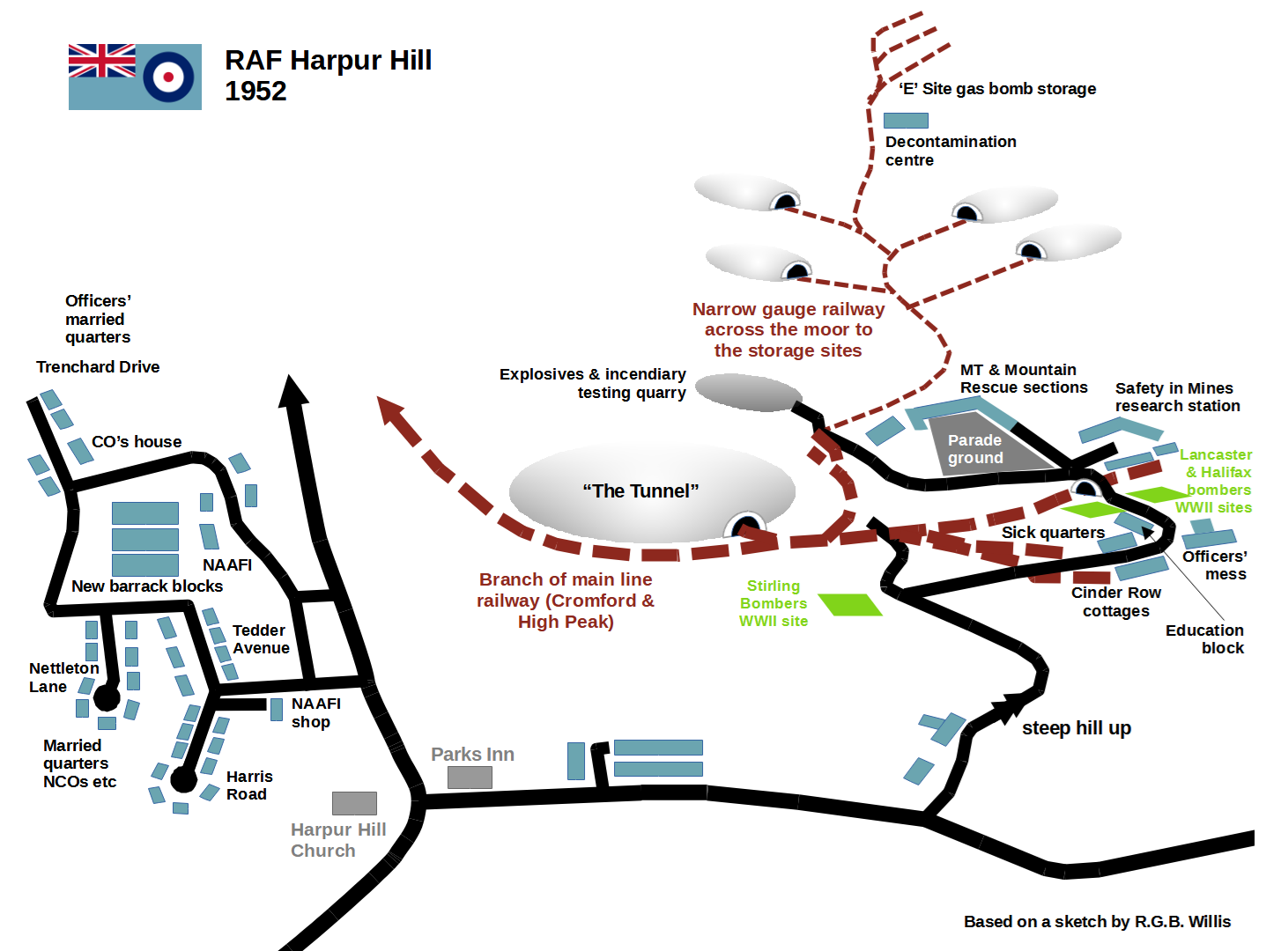
RAF site layout in 1952

== RAF Mountain Rescue Service ==
In common with many RAF stations the Station Medical Officer (SMO) at RAF Harpur Hill undertook the responsibility for searching for and assisting crews of aircraft that were lost or had crashed in their area. Although the RAF Mountain Rescue Service formed in July 1943, it was not until May 1945 that the Mountain Rescue Team at RAF Harpur Hill became a fully integrated and supported part of the RAF Mountain Rescue Service, within 28 Maintenance Unit RAF at Harpur Hill. The team was led by the site's medical officer Flight Lieutenant (later Air Commodore) Dr David Crichton and it recovered many wartime aircrew from crashes. The high moors and hills of the Peak District have accounted for over 250 aircraft crashes. On 3 November 1948 the RAF team was called out to locate the US Air Force (USAF) Boeing RB-29A Superfortress which had crashed near Bleaklow moor on the Kinder Scout moorland plateau. All 13 crew perished in the tragedy and the crashed aircraft became known as the Bleaklow Bomber. Much of the wreckage is still visible at the crash site, where a memorial was erected in 1988.

== Later uses ==
Tunnel in use as a mushroom farm in 1974

After the RAF left the tunnels, Somerset-based Wrington Vale Nurseries bought the underground tunnel network in 1964 and used it as a mushroom farm for over 10 years. Rubble from the demolition of Buxton’s Empire Hotel was used to fill in the channel of the railway line in the main tunnel. After the tunnels were closed again, they were sold to a group of local businessmen who traded under the name Stowtime, and were used as a cold store for cheese; a warehouse was built for dry and bonded wines and spirits. Several local hauliers provided the transport for these goods, including Lomas Distribution, T&C Naylor Haulage and Christian Salvesen. Christian Salvesen was a major employer in the area; it later sold the site to French transport company Norbert Dentressangle.

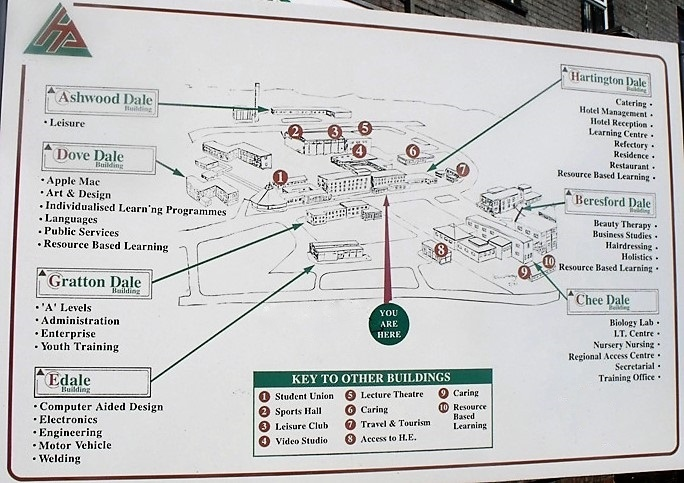
High Peak College campus in ex-RAF buildings on Burlow Road

Derbyshire College for Further Education moved from its 1950s premises in the Peak Buildings on Terrace Road to the former RAF base at Harpur Hill in 1965. It became known as High Peak College and closed on 1 August 1998.

== Current use ==
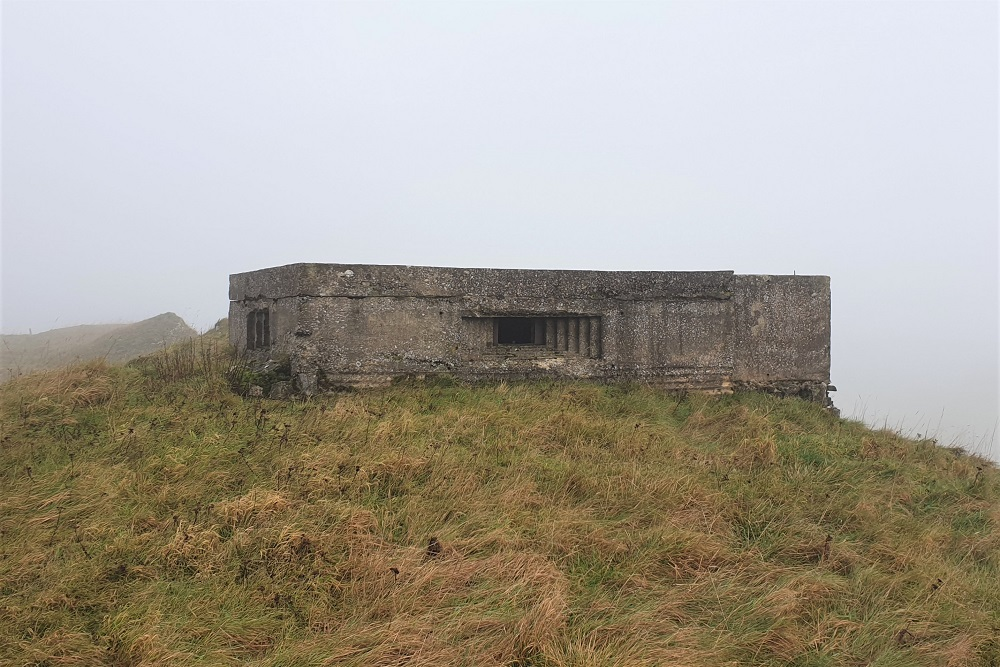
Machine gun bunker on High Edge

Many of the defensive bunkers can still be seen in the surrounding hillside. The site is now operated by the Health and Safety Executive Laboratory, which has had a presence on the site since 1924, when it was the Safety in Mines Research Establishment (SMRE).

== See also ==
- List of former Royal Air Force stations
- RAF munitions storage during World War II
