= Listed buildings in Peak Forest =

Peak Forest is a civil parish in the High Peak district of Derbyshire, England. The parish contains eight listed buildings that are recorded in the National Heritage List for England. All the listed buildings are designated at Grade II, the lowest of the three grades, which is applied to "buildings of national importance and special interest". The parish contains the village of Peak Forest, and is otherwise rural. Most of the listed buildings are farmhouses and farmbuildings, and the others consist of mileposts, a church and a reading room.

== Buildings ==
Name and location	Photograph	Date	Notes
Chamberknoll Farmhouse and outbuilding 53.31388°N 1.83914°W		Mid 18th century	The farmhouse and attached outbuilding are in limestone with gritstone dressings and a stone slate roof. There are two storeys, and both the house and the outbuilding each have three bays. The house has a central doorway with a pointed head, and mullioned windows. The outbuilding attached to the west contains three doorways and a taking-in door.
Peakshill Farmhouse; 53.34058°N 1.82826°W	—	Late 18th century	The farmhouse is in limestone with gritstone dressings, and a roof of Welsh slate and stone slate with coped gables. There are three storeys, a main range of three bays, and parallel lower ranges at the rear. On the front is a central doorway with a quoined surround and a bracketed hood, the window above it has a single light, and the other windows are mullioned with two casements. The windows in the rear ranges are sashes.
Nether Barn; 53.32113°N 1.83980°W		1781	A field barn in limestone with gritstone dressings, throughstones, and a roof of stone slate and tile. There storeys and five bays, with an offshut on the northwest bay.
Milepost near Perryfoot Farmhouse; 53.32831°N 1.85000°W		Early 19th century	The milepost is on the south side of the road, and is in hollow cast iron. It has a triangular plan and a dished top, and is inscribed with the distances to Sheffield, Hathersage, Castleton, and Sparrowpit.
Milepost near Peakshill Farmhouse; 53.33448°N 1.82732°W		Early 19th century	The milepost is on the southeast side of the road, and is in hollow cast iron. It has a triangular plan and a dished top, and is inscribed with the distances to Sheffield, Hathersage, Castleton, and Sparrowpit.
Perryfoot Farmhouse; 53.32792°N 1.85071°W	—	Early 19th century	The farmhouse is in limestone with gritstone dressings, and a slate roof with coped gables. There are two storeys, and a T-shaped plan, with a range of three bays, and a rear wing. The central doorway has a rectangular fanlight and a bracketed canopy, and the windows are sashes; those in the rear wing are tripartite.
Church of King Charles the Martyr; 53.30966°N 1.83089°W		1876–77	The church is in limestone with gritstone dressings and a slate roof, and is in Decorated style. It consists of a nave, north and south aisles, a chancel and a southwest tower. The tower has three stages, stepped buttresses, moulded string courses, a south doorway with a pointed arch, two-light bell openings with hood moulds, and an embattled parapet with crocketed pinnacles.
The Reading Room; 53.31014°N 1.83141°W		1880	The reading room incorporates material from a former chapel. The front is in gritstone with rusticated quoins, and the rest of the building is in limestone with gritstone dressings. The roof is in Welsh slate with crested ridges, and the north gable has moulded copings. The gable end contains a Venetian Window, and in the gable apex is an inscription and the date. The doorway is dated 1666.
