= Robert Whitehead (Derbyshire) =

Robert Whitehead (1856 – 1938) was an English landowner, businessman and Justice of the Peace (1915-1916). He was chairman or director of many businesses in the area including Cammell Laird shipbuilders, Brodsworth Colliery Staveley Coal and Iron Company and Leeds Forge Company Ltd and many more. He was the 2nd cousin to the Robert Whitehead who invented the torpedo and great-great Grandson of John Kay who invented the Flying Shuttle. In 1901 he took over the Hargate Estate, near the village of Wormhill, Derbyshire, where he lived until he died in 1938. He added massively to the estate which by 1910 comprised Hargate Wall, Hargate Hall, a lodge house, stables and huge centrally heated orangery. Hargate Wall and Hargate Hall actually swapped names. Robert Whitehead lived in the original Hargate Hall while Hargate Wall was being built. When it was completed, he moved into it but renamed it Hargate Hall and his original house then became Hargate Wall.

A previous occupant of the original Hargate Hall was the notorious mill owner Ellis Needham who owned Litton Mill.

He was also a keen breeder of Shire Horses and in 1937 presented a cup to the Ashbourne Show - The Ashbourne Silver perpetual challenge cup which is awarded to the best mare or filly one year old and upward shown at the show.
