= Harpur Hill =

Village in Derbyshire, England

Coordinates: 53.237°N 1.904°W

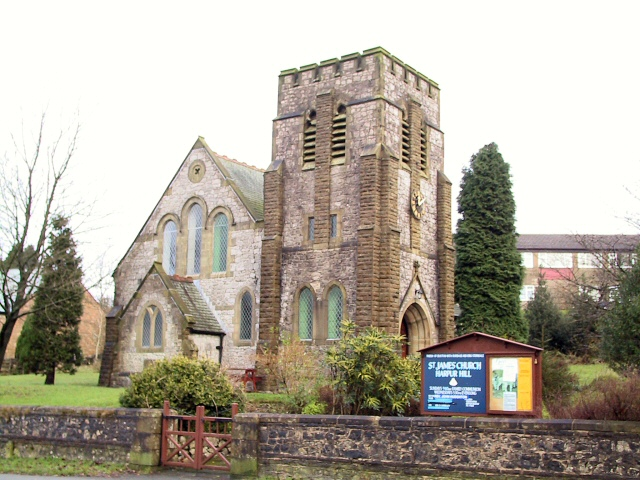
- St.James church at the junction in Harpur Hill.

- Location within Derbyshire
- OS grid reference: SK065711
- District: High Peak
- Shire county: Derbyshire
- Region: East Midlands
- Country: England
- Sovereign state: United Kingdom
- Post town: BUXTON
- Postcode district: SK17
- Police: Derbyshire
- Fire: Derbyshire
- Ambulance: East Midlands

Harpur Hill is a small village on the outskirts of Buxton, Derbyshire, England. It is in the Cote Heath ward of the High Peak Borough Council. It has a primary school, a park, a pub, a working men's club and a Methodist church.

From 1938 to 1969, No. 28 Maintenance Unit RAF was based at Harpur Hill and it included the RAF Mountain Rescue Team for the Peak District. RAF Harpur Hill was established as an underground munitions store. Tunnels were dug out to house munitions and ordnance. When the RAF left the tunnels were used as a mushroom farm. When the tunnels closed they were sold to a group of local businessmen and used as a cold store for cheese; a warehouse was built for dry and bonded wines and spirits. A number of local hauliers provided the transport for these goods. One of the hauliers was Lomas Distribution which was bought out by Christian Salvesen and was a major employer in the area; it later sold the site to French transport company Norbert Dentressangle. Many of the bunkers can still be seen in the surrounding hillside.

The Health and Safety Executive Laboratory is not far from Harpur Hill. From 1916 to 1918 the site housed The Frith Artillery Range. A railway was constructed with old London Underground Jubilee Line trains which were used to reconstruct the 7 July 2005 London bombings. A red flag is flown at the laboratory when an explosion is imminent.

Also nearby is Far Hill Quarry, now flooded, where swimming is discouraged by the authorities as unsafe due to the high pH level of the water.

Harpur Hill is the base of Harpur Club & Harpur Hill FC, and of Buxton Rugby Union Club. The tops of the rugby club's goal posts are the highest in the country.
