= St Margaret's Church, Wormhill =

St Margaret’s Church, Wormhill
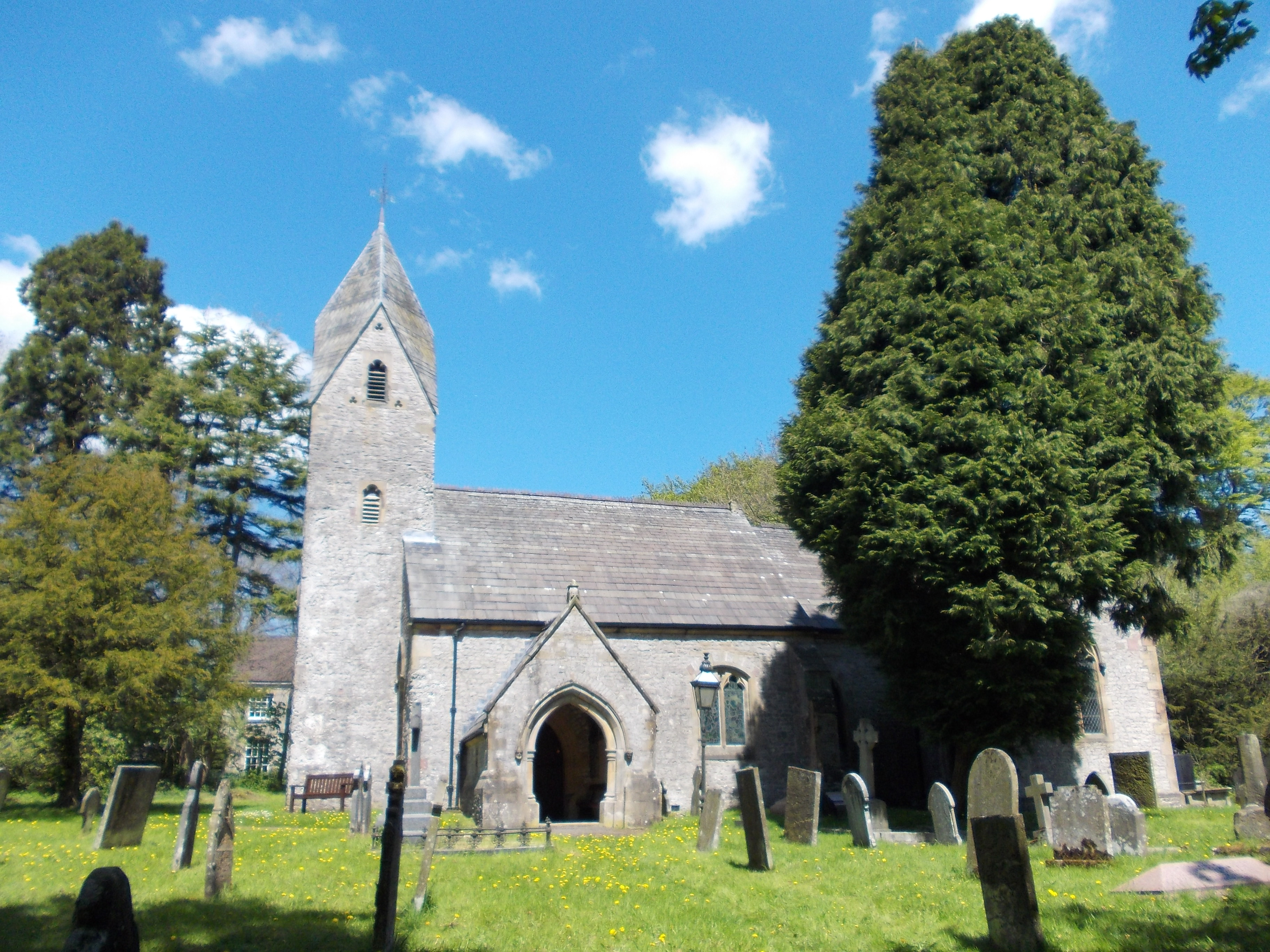
- St Margaret’s Church, Wormhill
- St Margaret’s Church, Wormhill
- 53°15′51.13″N 1°48′52.77″W
- Location: Wormhill, Derbyshire SK17 8SL
- Country: England
- Denomination: Church of England

History
- Dedication: St Margaret

Architecture
- Heritage designation: Grade II* listed
- Designated: 21 April 1967

Administration
- Diocese: Diocese of Derby
- Archdeaconry: Chesterfield
- Deanery: Bakewell and Eyam
- Parish: Wormhill

St Margaret's Church, Wormhill is a Grade II* listed parish church in the Church of England in Wormhill, Derbyshire.

== History ==
The medieval chapel was enlarged and altered in 1746 when a low porch and west gallery were erected. In 1826 another gallery was erected over the communion table to accommodate the singers. It was rebuilt by the architect T H Rushforth of London and reopened on 16 June 1864. The contractor was Charles Humphreys of Derby.

Transepts were added between 1904 and 1910.

== Parish status ==
The church is in a joint parish with

- St John the Evangelist's Church, Cressbrook
- Christ Church, Litton
- St Anne's Church, Millers Dale
- St John the Baptist, Tideswell

== Organ ==
The church contains a pipe organ by J. Porritt. A specification of the organ can be found on the National Pipe Organ Register.

== See also ==
- Grade II* listed buildings in High Peak
- Listed buildings in Wormhill
