= Peak Forest =

Village in Derbyshire, England

Coordinates: 53.310°N 1.831°W

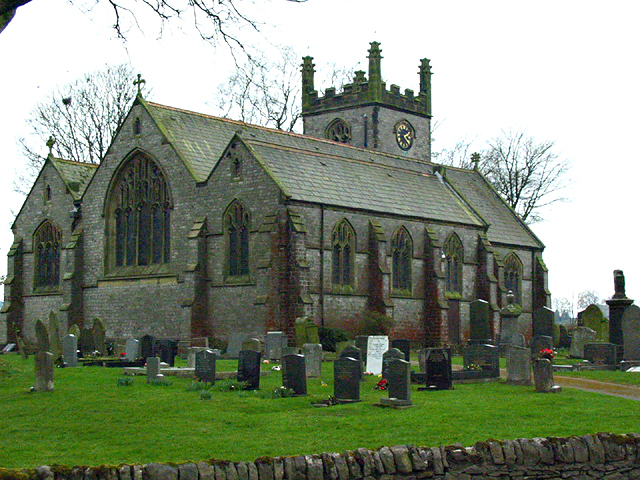
- The church

- Location within Derbyshire
- Population: 335 (2011)
- OS grid reference: SK113793
- District: High Peak
- Shire county: Derbyshire
- Region: East Midlands
- Country: England
- Sovereign state: United Kingdom
- Post town: BUXTON
- Postcode district: SK17
- Dialling code: 01298
- Police: Derbyshire
- Fire: Derbyshire
- Ambulance: East Midlands
- UK Parliament: High Peak

Peak Forest is a small village and civil parish on the main road the (A623) from Chapel-en-le-Frith to Chesterfield in Derbyshire. The population of the civil parish at the 2011 census was 335.

The village grew from the earlier settlement of Dam (still inhabited, with a number of houses and farms) at the conjunction of Perrydale and Damdale. There is an inn, a church and a primary school. Its name probably derives from the Forest of High Peak. The village is at the heart of the old royal forest and was formerly known as Chamber of Campana. The nearby Chamber Farm or Chamber Knoll may have been the exact location of the residence and meeting place of local forest officials.

Its church is dedicated to 'Charles, King & Martyr' (King Charles I of England, executed in 1649). First erected in 1657, it was replaced in 1878 as a gift from the Duke of Devonshire. Until an Act of Parliament was passed in 1754 its minister was able to perform marriages without the need for reading the banns, and the village was known as the Gretna Green of Derbyshire.

The Peak Forest Canal, although originally aiming for the limestone quarries in Great Rocks Dale just to the south of the village, never reached nearer than Buxworth, seven miles away, where it terminates at Bugsworth Basin. Instead, a horse-drawn tramway, the Peak Forest Tramway, was constructed in the late 18th century to connect the canal with the quarries between Dove Holes and Peak Forest.

The original limestone-carrying purpose of the canal was replaced long ago by the Great Rocks mineral railway line serving the quarries around Buxton and joining the Manchester–Sheffield line, via the diverging Chapel Milton Viaduct over the Black Brook valley at Chapel Milton (between Chapel-en-le-Frith and Chinley). Its railway station (now closed) was built by the Midland Railway, two miles away at Small Dale. This was on its extension of the Manchester, Buxton, Matlock and Midlands Junction Railway, part of the main Midland Line from Manchester to London. It was also the northern junction for the line from Buxton.

Stage 1 of the Peak District Boundary Walk runs from Buxton to Peak Forest.

== See also ==
- Listed buildings in Peak Forest
