= Health and Safety Laboratory =

Agency of the Health and Safety Executive in the United Kingdom

Coordinates: 53.23042°N 1.91808°W

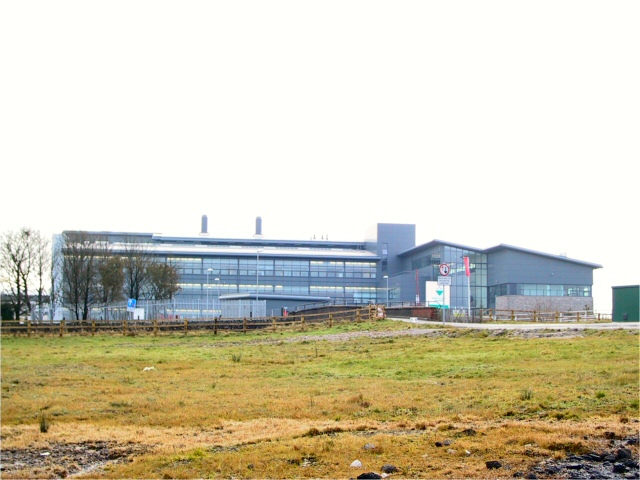
Building completed in 2005

The Health and Safety Laboratory (HSE Laboratory or HSL Buxton) is a large 550-acre research site in rural High Peak, Derbyshire, south of Buxton.

It researches new methods in industrial safety. It provides training courses in subjects such as Control of Major Accident Hazards Regulations 2015 (COMAH) and DSEAR (Dangerous Substances and Explosive Atmospheres Regulations, 2002).

== History ==
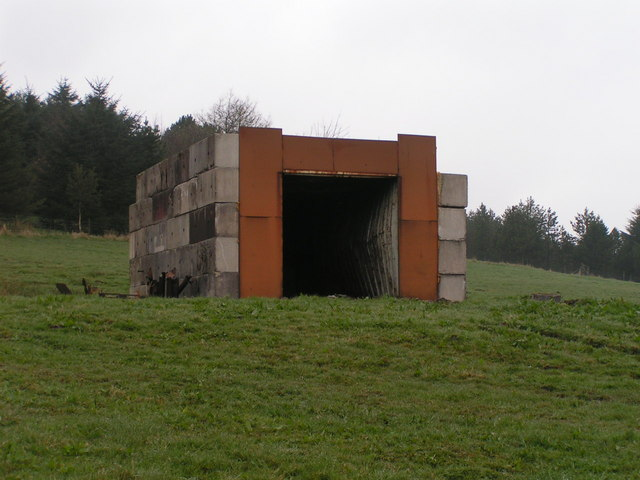
A bunker at the laboratory

It started out as the Safety in Mines Research Establishment (SMRE) in 1947. The Safety in Mines Research Board had been formed in 1921, and it bought the site in Harpur Hill in 1924. It researched work into safety of mining. Other research laboratories for mining safety had been opened in 1928 in Sheffield. At the SMRE in 1956, Herbert Eisner discovered how high-expansion foam can put out fires.

The Occupational Medicine Laboratory opened in London in 1959, and this merged with the site in Derbyshire to form the Health and Safety Executive's (HSE) Research and Laboratory Services Division (RLSD). All of the laboratories became the Health and Safety Laboratory in 1995, and it was managed as an arms length Agency of HSE for 20 years. In 2015 the laboratory’s agency status ceased and it was reintegrated into the UK's Health and Safety Regulator HSE, operating as the HSE's science division.

== Structure ==
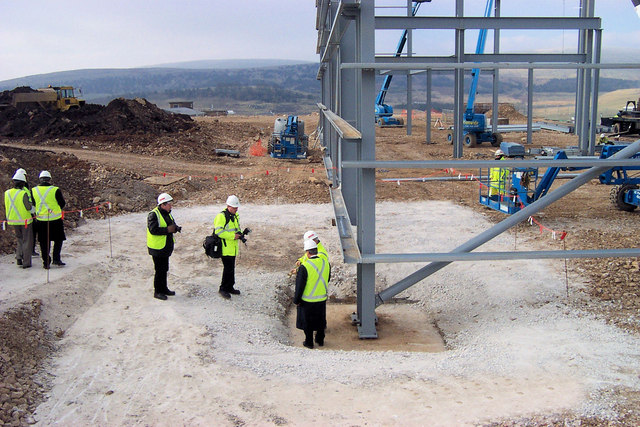
Building a new laboratory in 2011

It is sited near Harpur Hill, west of the A515.

== See also ==
- Baseefa, based nearby on the other side of the A515 towards Buxton
- Building Research Establishment, similar establishment, focusing on building science, based in Hertfordshire, close to the M1 at Bricket Wood
- National Personal Protective Technology Laboratory
- Office of Mine Safety and Health Research
