= Buxton lime industry =

History of the lime industry in Buxton, Derbyshire

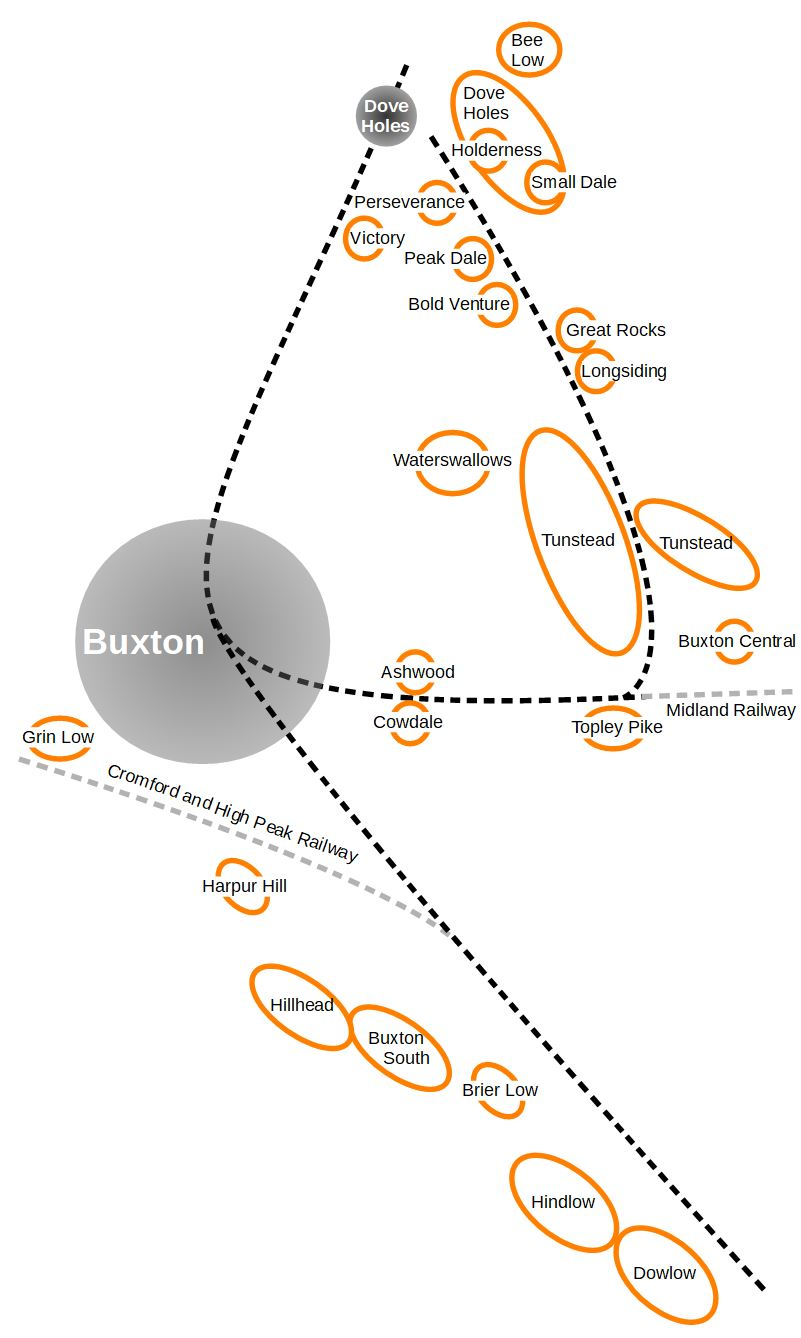
Map of Buxton's limestone quarries and freight railways

The Buxton lime industry has been important for the development of the town of Buxton in Derbyshire, England, and it has shaped the landscape around the town.

== Geology ==
The White Peak area of the Peak District is named after the limestone plateau landscape of the 'Derbyshire Dome'. This limestone outcrop is surrounded by a horseshoe-shaped formation of younger sandstones (gritstones) and shales. Buxton is at the western edge of the limestone region. The layers of carboniferous limestone were deposited in a warm shallow sea in the Brigantian stage of the Carboniferous period (around 330 million years ago). These deposits were compressed into rocks which over time were uplifted and folded into a dome. Erosion of the younger sandstones exposed the limestone strata. The limestone in the Bee Low and Woo Dale limestone formations around Buxton is of unusually high quality, with less than 3% dolomite and less than 1% chert.

== History ==
Limestone has been quarried as building stone in the Buxton area for centuries.

Lime (also known as quicklime) is produced easily by heating limestone and it has been used for thousands of years. Lime mortar (a mix of lime, sand and water) has been used since ancient times for fixing together the stone blocks of buildings. Lime became used as a soil improver in agriculture since the late Middle Ages. Before electric lights, lime was burnt to light theatrical shows, putting the stage performers 'in the limelight'. Traditional round 'pudding pie' lime kilns were built around Buxton to burn limestone that was layered with wood, coal or coke. The lime powder was drawn from the bottom of the kiln, after it had burnt for 3 to 5 days and then cooled for a further 2 days. The process generated huge quantities of burnt waste material, taking 3 tonnes of limestone and 3 tonnes of coal to make 1 tonne of lime powder.

=== Grin Low ===
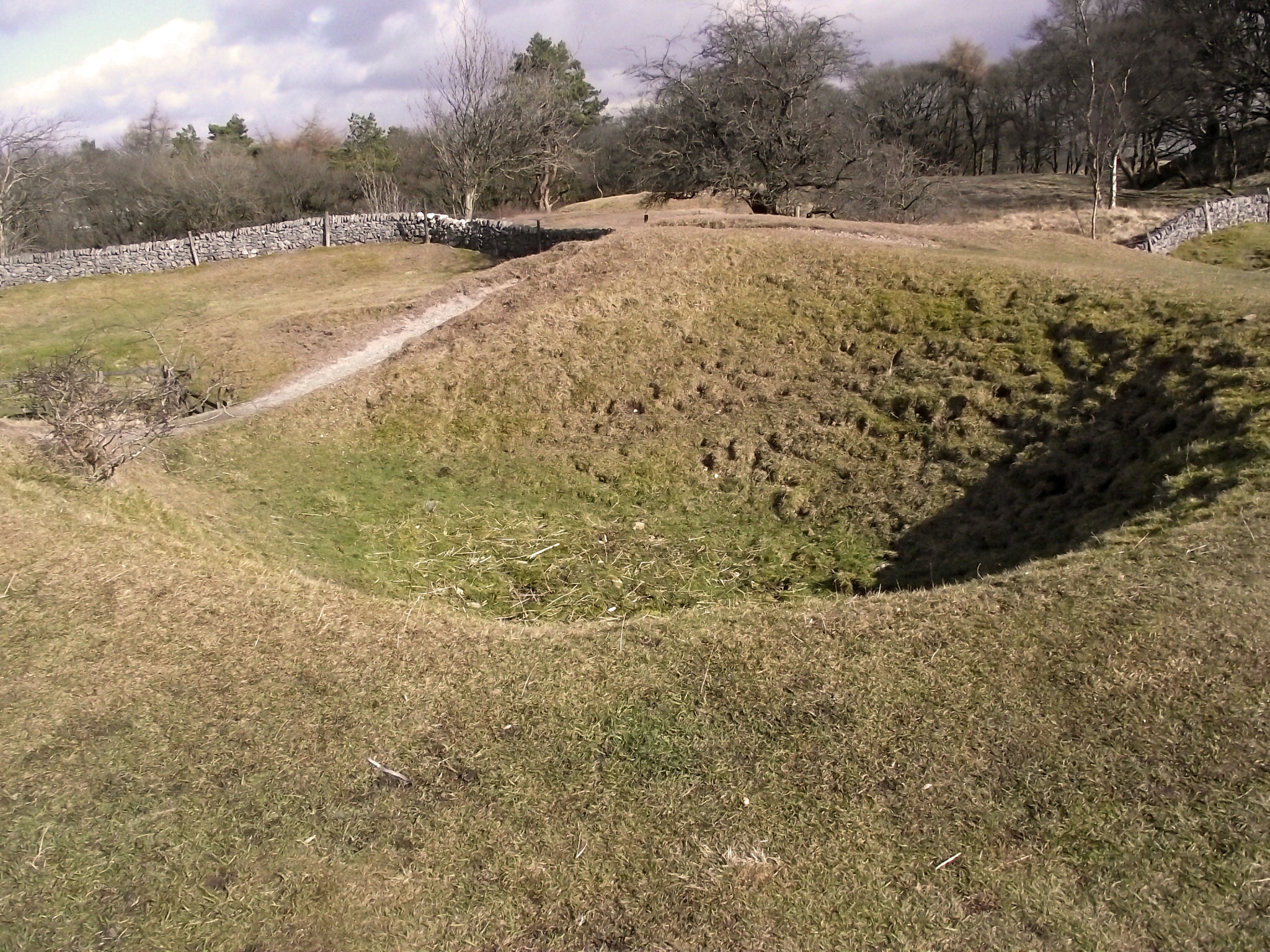
Remains of a lime kiln at Grin Low

Grin Low was the main location in Buxton for the early lime industry. It was an extensive area of limestone quarrying and was licensed for lime burning from 1662 by the 1st Duke of Devonshire. Demand for lime grew dramatically during the Industrial Revolution. There are widespread remains of over 100 large lime kilns, built of earth and rock, which date from the 17th–19th centuries. The land is also covered in spoil heaps of waste material. Coal came from local collieries at Axe Edge and Goyts Moss. In 1820 the 6th Duke of Devonshire commissioned the 'Grin Plantation' (now the wooded Buxton Country Park) to shield the scarred lime-burning landscape from visitors to the spa town of Buxton. In the 1850s lime production at Grin Low moved to a new large quarry on the south side of the hill (which was operated until its closure in 1952). In 1890 Grin Low produced 90,000 tonnes of lime.

Grin Low Wood is a designated Site of Special Scientific Interest (SSSI).

Lime burning had also taken place at Dove Holes since 1650. The opening of the Cromford and High Peak Railway in 1831 generated expansion of quarrying around Buxton, with 4 new quarries: Harpur Hill Quarry in 1835, Perseverance in 1847, and Holderness and Bold Venture in 1857 at Dove Holes.

=== Brunner Mond ===
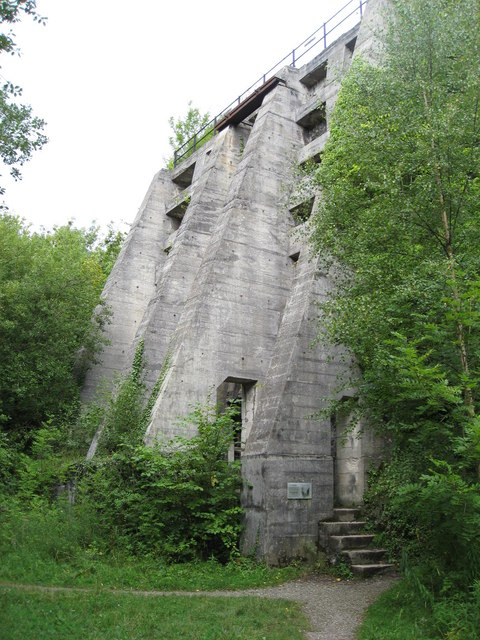
Victorian lime kilns on the Midland line to Buxton

In 1861 Belgian chemist Ernest Solvay developed the Solvay process (also called the ammonia-soda process) for the production of soda ash (sodium carbonate) from salt brine and limestone. Soda ash (or washing soda) was used for producing soaps, for dying textiles and for making glass.

The Brunner Mond company was formed in 1873 by John Brunner and Ludwig Mond. In 1874 they started using the Solvay process to make soda ash at Winnington works in Northwich, from the large local salt deposits and with limestone from Derbyshire. The soda ash was needed for the Lancashire cotton industry and for glass manufacture in St Helens.

=== Buxton Lime Firms ===
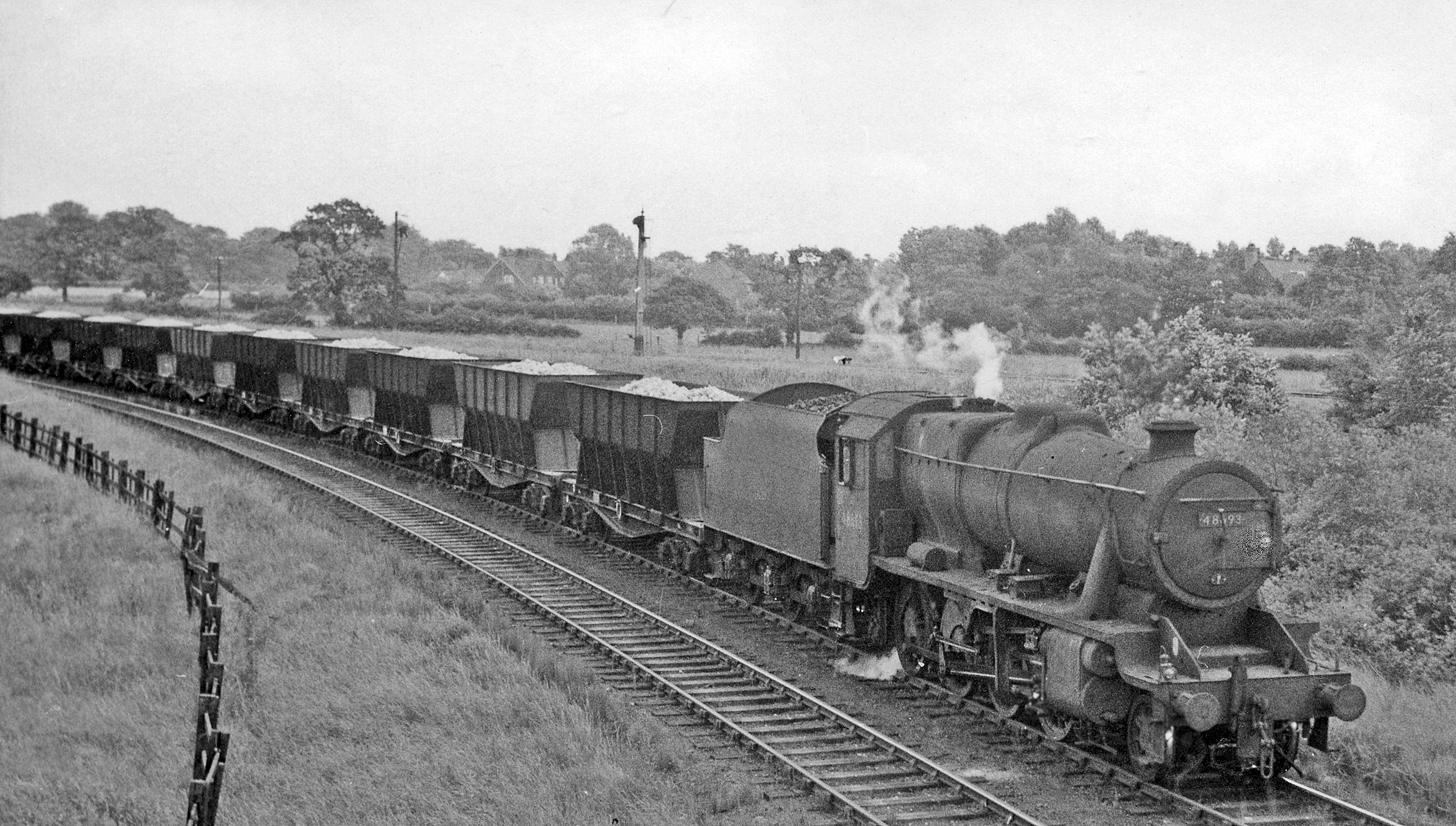
Limestone train from Tunstead to ICI Winnington, 1964

The arrival of the main railway lines from Manchester and London to Buxton in the 1860s prompted the opening of many further quarries: Victory in 1863, Ashwood Dale in 1864, Great Rocks in 1869, Peak Dale in 1877, Oldham Lime in 1878, East Buxton in 1880, Hindlow in 1882 and Buxton Central in 1885.

Buxton Lime Firms (BLF) was formed by 13 competing quarry owners in 1891. BLF controlled the price of stone and lime from its 17 initial quarries. BLF owned over 1500 acres of land with about 100 lime kilns and 3 collieries. It produced 360,000 tons of limestone and 280,000 tons of lime per year. Larger, more advanced kilns were now in use and firebricks were introduced into kilns from 1907. By 1915 BLF had developed or acquired an additional 9 quarries including the opening of: Small Dale in 1891, Dowlow in 1898, Buxton South in 1900, Topley Pike in 1907, Brier Low in 1907, Cowdale in 1908. BLF supplied increasing quantities of lime to Brunner Mond until Brunner Mond acquired BLF in 1919, when Bee Low quarry was also opened.

=== I.C.I. Lime Division ===
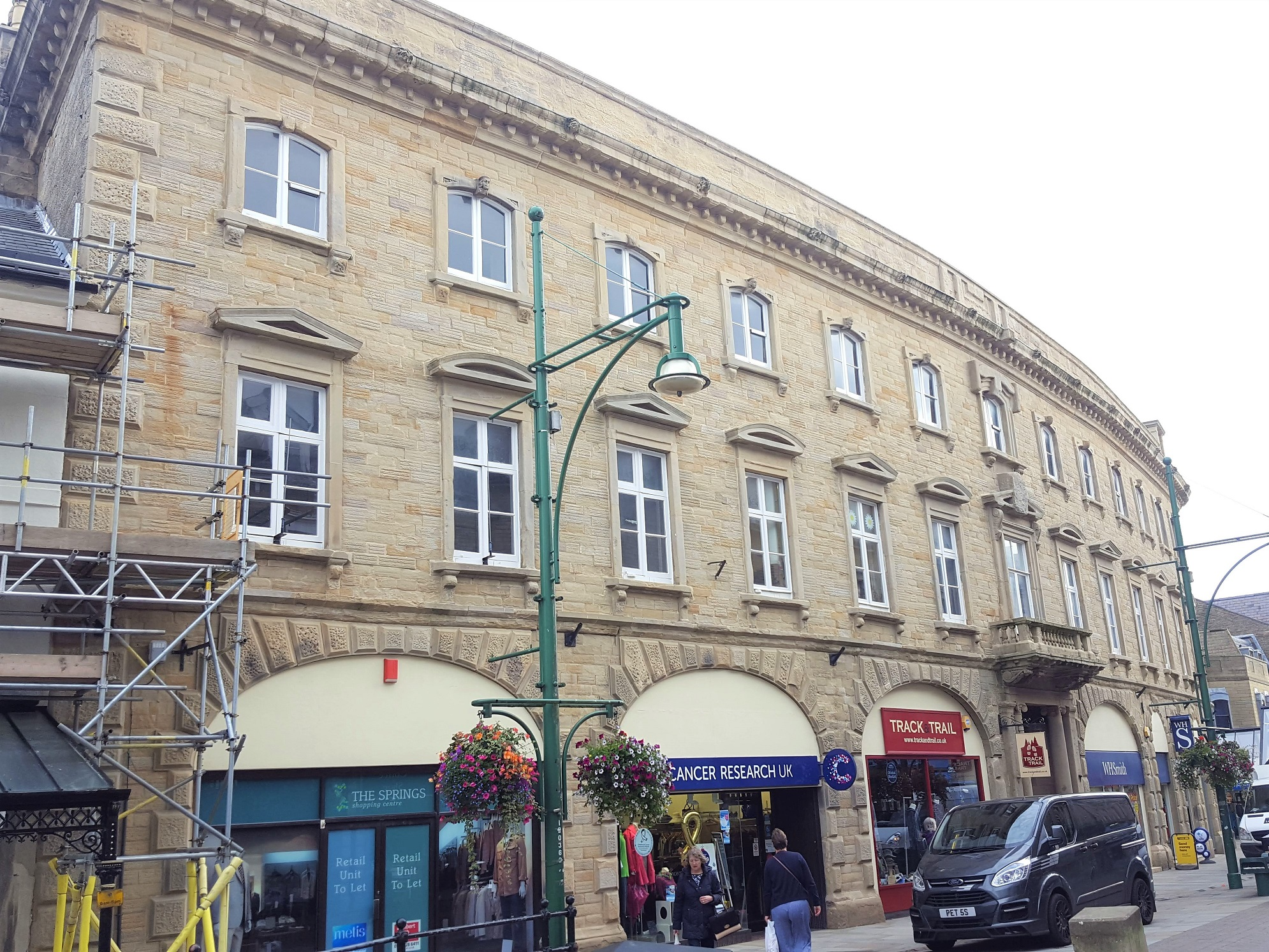
ICI Lime Division HQ building at the old Royal Hotel

In 1926 Imperial Chemical Industries (ICI) was formed through the merger of Brunner Mond, Nobel Industries, United Alkali Company and British Dyestuffs Corporation. Buxton was the headquarters for I.C.I. Lime Division, with its main offices in the old Royal Hotel building on Spring Gardens. Hillhead quarry was opened in 1927 followed by Hindlow Lane in 1928 (which was expanded with seven new kilns in 1930–31). Development of the current works at Tunstead quarry did not commence until 1929, following the expiry of leases on various other quarries in 1922.

During World War II, open-topped kilns were decommissioned due to strict blackout regulations for air raids and many quarries closed.

In 1992 I.C.I. sold its Lime Division to Anglo American as Buxton Lime Industries, which became part of its UK Tarmac operation.

=== Modern industry ===
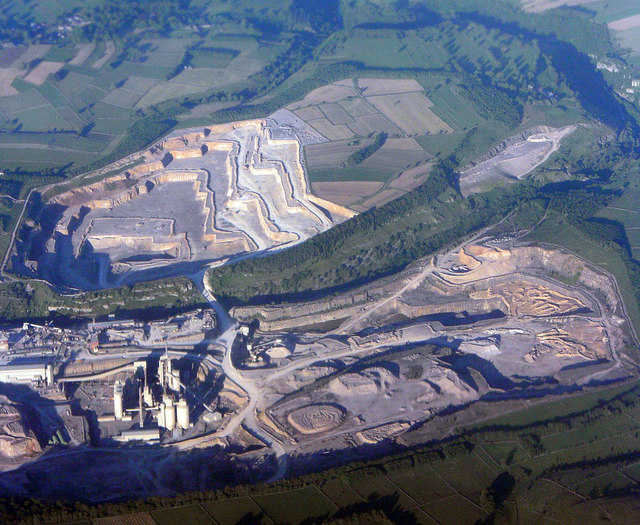
Aerial view of Tunstead Quarry

Modern quarrying is a high-technology industry using advanced machinery, supplying concrete and cement to the construction industry. Several active limestone quarries are still located close to Buxton, including the "Tunstead Superquarry", operated by Tarmac in Great Rocks Dale. It is the largest limestone quarry in the UK producing 5.5 million tonnes per year, a quarter of which is used by the cement works on site. Tarmac also operates the Hindlow Quarry at Sterndale Moor. Breedon's Dowlow Quarry is also at Sterndale Moor. The Great Rocks Line runs between these quarries and Buxton, where it joins the main railway network. The Topley Pike Quarry is now owned and run by Aggregate Industries.
