= Buxton Mountain Rescue Team =

Charity operating search and rescue missions

- Abbreviation: BMRT
- Formation: 1964
- Type: Charitable organisation
- Registration no.: Registered charity number: 1153507
- Headquarters: 8A Hallsteads, Dove Holes, Buxton, Derbyshire SK17 8BJ
- Region served: England
- Website: Official website

The Buxton Mountain Rescue Team is a UK registered charity operating search and rescue missions from its base at Dove Holes near Buxton in Derbyshire. The team covers an area of about 400 square miles across Derbyshire, Staffordshire and Cheshire.

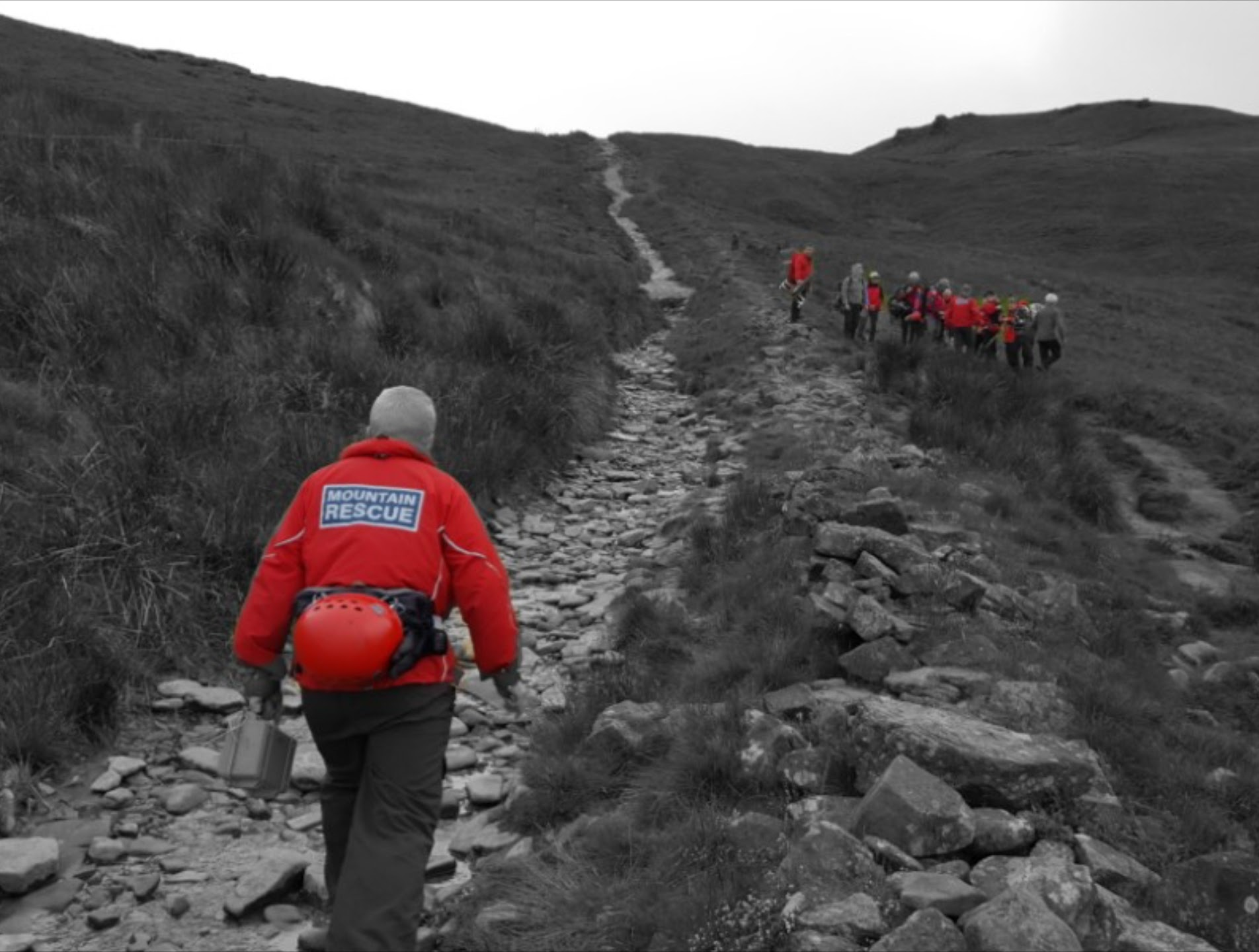
Buxton MRT at Jacob's Ladder

Buxton Mountain Rescue Team (MRT) is staffed by about 60 volunteers, with search and rescue dogs and 4 rescue vehicles. The team is funded exclusively through donations and fundraising and responds to about 100 call outs by the Derbyshire Police and East Midlands Ambulance Service every year. It is one of the seven member teams of the Peak District Mountain Rescue Organisation (PDMRO). The purpose of PDMRO is "to save life and alleviate distress, primarily in Upland and Mountain areas". This is achieved by conducting search and rescue missions for walkers, climbers and missing persons in and around the Peak District National Park. Buxton MRT and the PDMRO were both established in 1964 following the deaths of three young scouts during a blizzard on the Four Inns Walk in 1964.

Previously, from the 1940s until the 1960s, the Royal Air Force Mountain Rescue Service for the Peak District was based at RAF Harpur Hill, by Harpur Hill in Buxton. On 3 November 1948 the RAF team was called out to locate the US Air Force (USAF) Boeing RB-29A Superfortress which had crashed on Bleaklow moor near the Kinder Scout moorland plateau. All 13 crew perished in the tragedy and the crashed plane became known as the Bleaklow Bomber. Much of the wreckage is still visible at the crash site, where a memorial was erected in 1988.

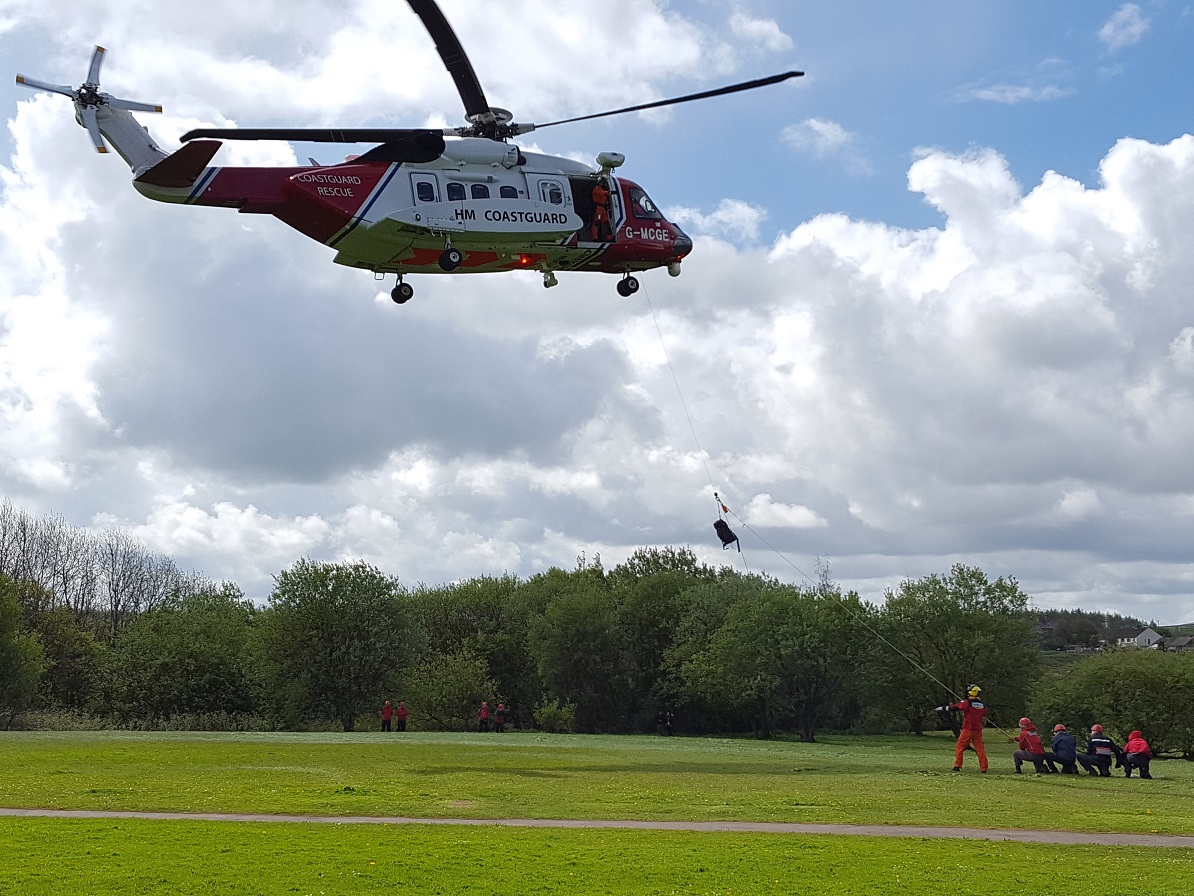
Buxton MRT helicopter training at Dove Holes

Buxton MRT's headquarters at Dove Holes near Buxton was opened on 14 June 1990 by HRH Diana, Princess of Wales. In 2003 HRH Prince Andrew opened the base's extension building which houses the team’s vehicles, equipment, climbing wall and incident control centre.

In the 2013 Birthday Honours, team member Ian Hurst was appointed a Member of the Order of the British Empire (MBE) for services to mountain rescue.
