= Nigel Vardy =

South African mountaineer and motivational speaker

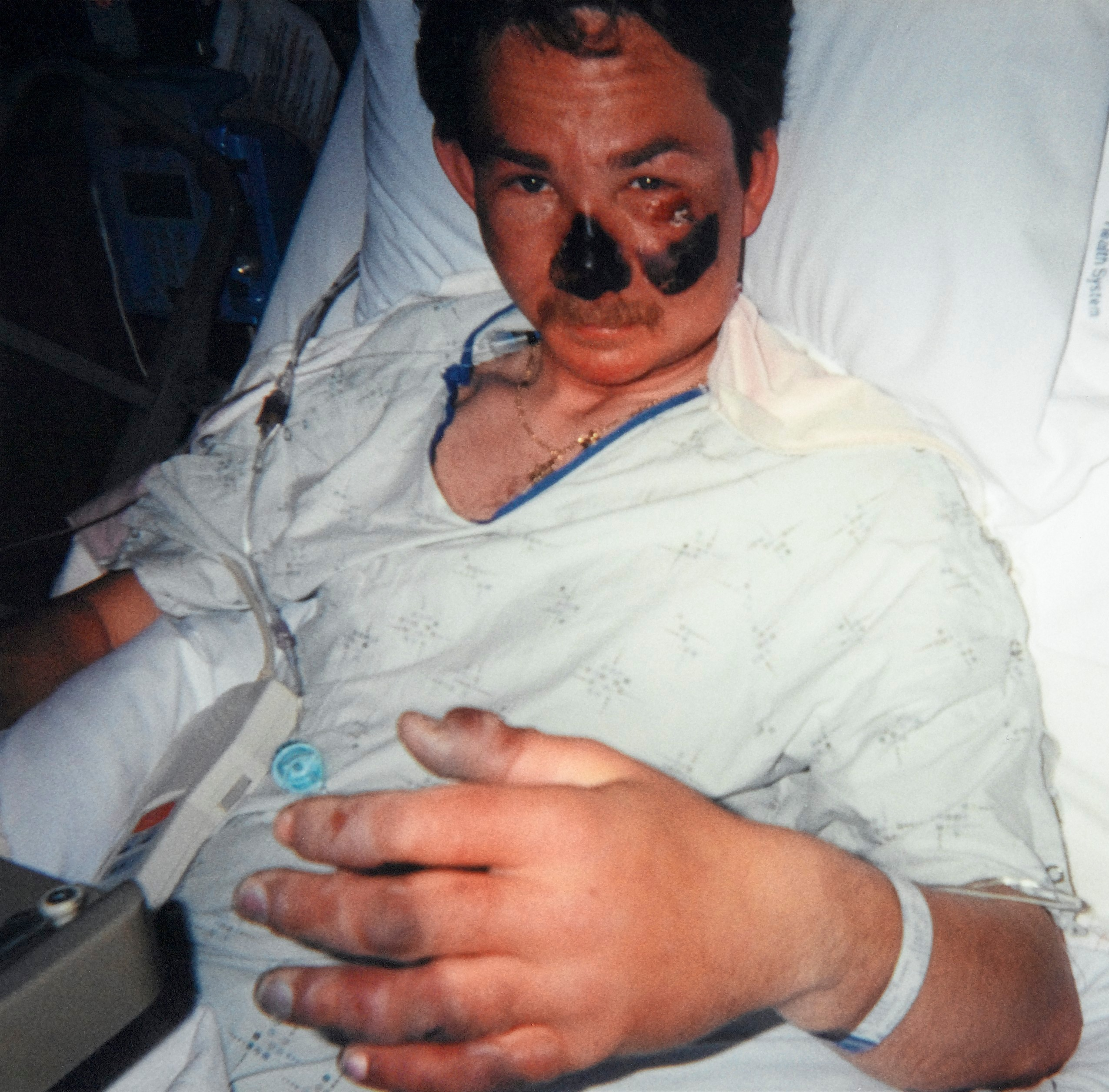
- Vardy in hospital, 1999

Personal information
- Nationality: British

Nigel Vardy is an English mountaineer whose experiences of recovering from severe frostbite injuries led him to become a motivational speaker and author.

Vardy was rescued after being overtaken by darkness at high altitude on a climb of Denali in Alaska in May 1999, facing temperatures of −76 °F (−60 °C). He suffered severe frostbite, and his injuries led to the amputation of all his toes, parts of all his fingers, and his nose. In 2006 a 45-minute documentary was broadcast of his party's incident on Denali for the TV series I Shouldn't Be Alive.

Months of recovery followed his accident, but Vardy eventually returned to climbing, explored mountains across the world, and three years later successfully returned to high-altitude climbing by reaching Island Peak in Nepal. In 2014, despite his lack of toes, Vardy reached Gunnbjørn Fjeld, the highest mountain north of the Arctic Circle, as well as undertaking a further mountaineering expedition in Nepal. He also became the first Briton to achieve the "seven peaks-seven islands" challenge, summitting the highest peaks on the world's seven largest islands.

Vardy uses his experiences of rescue, recovery and return to mountaineering as a motivational speaker, and is sometimes known as "Mr. Frostbite". In 2016 Mountain Rescue magazine announced that he had become an associate of the Buxton Mountain Rescue Team in the Peak District, helping to fund raise and train others. Vardy was appointed a "Get Outside Champion" by the British Ordnance Survey in 2017, and is an ambassador for the Mountain Heritage Trust.

== Publications ==
- Vardy, N. (2008). Once Bitten. Panoma Press, St Albans. ISBN 978-1905823277
- Vardy, N. (2011). Seven Peaks – Seven Islands. Panoma Press, St Albans. ISBN 978-1907722271
