= Four Inns Walk =

Hiking event in the Peak District, England

- Location: Derbyshire
- Country: England
- Date: 1957
- Defunct: 2019

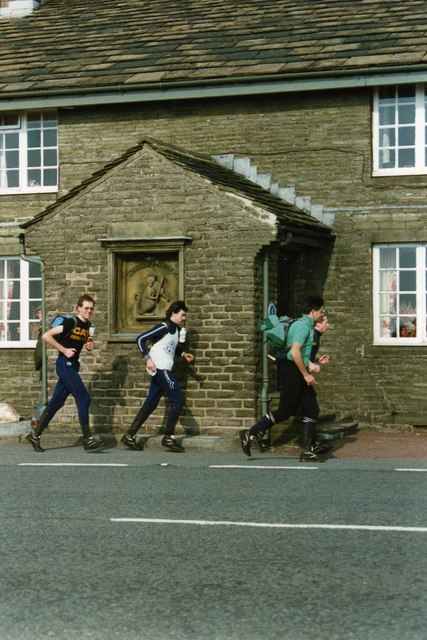
Cat and Fiddle Inn, Four Inns Walk, 1988

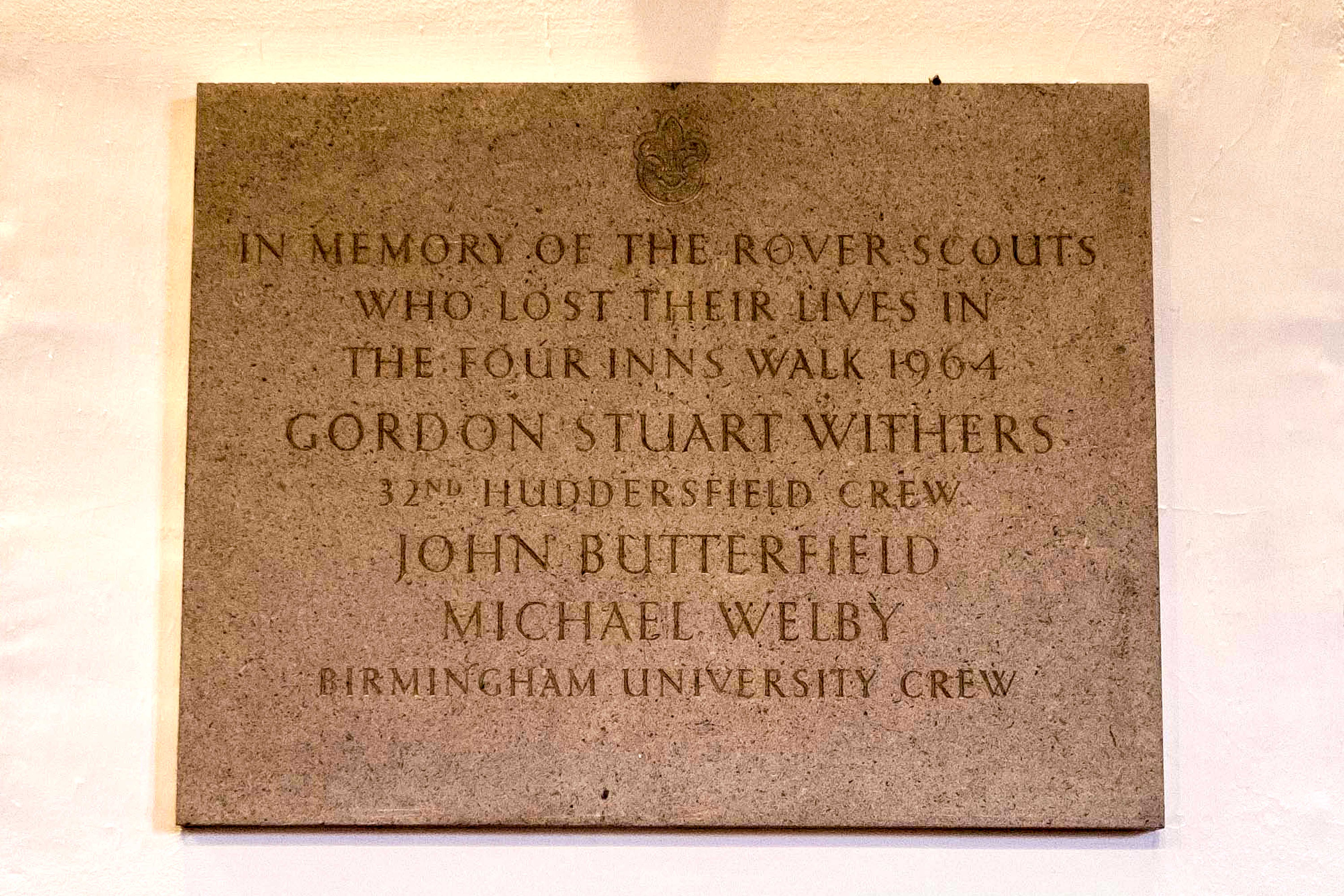
Memorial to the 1964 Four Inns Walk disaster, Gordon Withers, John Butterfield and Michael Welby, The Church of the Holy and Undivided Trinity, Edale

The Four Inns was a fell race/hiking event held annually over the high moorlands of the Northern Peak District between 1957 and 2019, by the Derbyshire Scouts Association (1908-). It took place mainly in Derbyshire (though it started in Yorkshire and, near the end, made a short detour into Cheshire), in northern England. It was a competitive event, without an overnight camp (although teams must be equipped to bivouac if the conditions are severe enough to warrant it). It was first held as a Rover Scout event in 1957, but was later opened to other teams of experienced hill walkers and fell runners.

It is called the 4 Inns because it passes 3 pubs on the way plus the site of another...the derelict Isle of Skye Inn...the Snake Inn...the Old Nags Head Inn...the Cat and Fiddle Inn

The event last ran in 2019 when reduced interest from members of the Scouting Association caused the organisers to end the event.

== Rules ==
The event was undertaken in teams of three or four, for safety reasons, and at least two of these team members had to be at least 17 (the others may be 16) on the day of the event. An amount of equipment had to be carried by the team, including survival bags, emergency rations, a first-aid kit, and a group shelter. Any member of a team was allowed to drop out at any point, but the rest of the team were not permitted to continue the event unless they were in a group of not less than 3, or more than 7 people (which can be formed by combining two groups together). The remaining team members had to carry all of the safety equipment. Any team that had not reached the checkpoint at Chapel-en-le-Frith before 21:15 was not allowed to complete the rest of the event. No dogs were allowed to accompany the walkers.

== Route ==
The 40-mile (65 km) hike started at St. David's Church, Woodhead Road, Holmbridge. The route headed west, to the first of the 12 checkpoints, the site of The Isle of Skye Inn (derelict), then the route headed south, crossing the flanks of Black Hill. Next, it passed through Hey Moss, Crowden, Tor Side, Bleaklow, and Doctor's Gate to the Snake (Pass) Inn. The next checkpoint was over the Kinder plateau to the Nag's Head Inn in Edale. The route then passed through Chapel-en-le-Frith, White Hall, and the Goyt Valley to the Cat and Fiddle Inn, finally descending for the finish to Buxton Community School, Buxton.

Usually, two thirds of the teams finished the event, in times between 8 and 16 hours (the course record of 6 hours 38 minutes was set in 2013). However, some teams took longer than this, and some took over 20 hours. At most of the checkpoints, hot drinks and sandwiches were given to the competitors, and several Mountain Rescue teams were on hand to ensure their safety.

== Awards ==
A number of trophies were available for teams that completed the event. These are:

| Trophy | Awarded for | Event Record + Year |
|---|---|---|
| Four Inns Cup | Fastest Overall team | Too Much Fibre - 6 hrs 38 mins (2013) |
| President's Trophy | Fastest Scout team | Flipper's Gang - 6 hrs 45 mins (2010) |
| Eric Thompson Memorial Trophy | Fastest mixed team | Carnethy Hill - 7 hrs 48 mins (2008) |
| George Keeling Memorial Trophy | Fastest novice non-Scout team | Dicky's Dream Team - 8 hrs 35 mins (2010) |
| The Innsman Trophy | Fastest team with all team members over 40 years of age | Macclesfield Harriers - 7 hrs 19 mins (2005) |
| Freda Thompson Trophy | Fastest Scout team with all members under 25 | Viking VSU 'B' - 8 hrs 9 mins (1983) |
| Derbyshire Plate | Fastest Scout team representing a Group outside Derbyshire | Thrust - 8 hrs 8 mins (2011) |
| Falcon Trophy | Fastest female team | Run Like A Girl - 9 hrs 28 mins (2009) |
| Kim Gale Trophy | Fastest novice Scout Team | Endurance Danzz - 9 hrs 59 mins (2017) |

== The 1964 hypothermia tragedy ==
Three Rover Scouts, aged 19, 21, and 24, died of hypothermia in the 1964 event. The youngest was a member of the 32nd Huddersfield (Dalton) Rover Crew and the older two were from the Birmingham University Rover Crew. Travelling lightly laden and without support, they were overtaken by deteriorating weather, including 30 mph winds, heavy rain, and temperatures from 0 to 7 °C above the Snake Pass. The youngest of the group got into trouble in the upper reaches of the Alport valley. One of his team members summoned help and he was brought down to Alport Castles Farm by the Glossop Rover Crew. He was taken to hospital but died later. The two other scouts who died were in a separate team, but in the same area. A third member of that team was found in the Alport valley and taken to safety, but he was unable to give accurate information about where the rest of the team were. Because of the worsening weather, the search had to be called off during the night, but it was resumed on Sunday morning. However, it was not until Monday afternoon that the first body was recovered. By Tuesday, 370 people were involved with the search and the second body was recovered later that morning. (In that year, when the event fell in mid-March, only 22 of the initial field of over 240 finished.)

Ken Drabble was appointed one of the Kinder Scout National Nature Reserve first six assistant wardens in 1964 and in the same year "took part in a night-time search for survivors of the Four Inns Walk in appalling conditions when three young Rover Scouts died. The tragedy led to the formation of the Peak District Mountain Rescue Organisation in which Mr Drabble played a key role, helping set up a mountain rescue control centre and a ‘snatch squad’ system for quick response which is still used today. He was the first warden in Longdendale, then transferred to Edale, becoming head warden in 1970."

The tragedy was partially responsible for the foundation of the Buxton Mountain Rescue Team, and Peak District Mountain Rescue Organisation.

Pugh's big finding – significant enough to be published in Nature – was that a combination of wet and windy conditions could reduce the thermal properties of clothing to nearly nothing...leading to a deadly circle of fatigue and hypothermia...

A respiration and metabolism project, devised to identify the metabolic and biochemical basis for this tragedy, was performed during the 1965 event by the Medical Research Council, with young volunteers. There is a memorial tablet to the three Scouts in The Church of the Holy and Undivided Trinity, Edale, dedicated in a memorial service held on Sunday, 22 May 1966. There is also a small memorial cairn in the Alport valley, at approximately 53.4278°N 1.8085°W. Presumably this is near to where the two scouts were found.

"...following the death of three rover scouts in atrocious weather during the annual Four Inns walk in 1964 John Foster set up the Peak District Mountain Rescue Organisation and the Edale Mountain Rescue Team..."

...it was only following the deaths of three scouts, who were participating in the Four Inns Walk in 1964, that the current form of structure for the Peak District came into being. At that time there were nineteen teams covering the whole of the Peak District; now there are seven teams.

The Peak District Mountain Rescue was set up after three scouts died doing a walking event, called the Four Inns Walk, in winter. It wasn’t properly marshalled, and they couldn’t get a proper rescue team to go and get them, so off the back of that, they thought they’d formalise it and set up proper teams.

== See also ==
- Scouting
- Ten Tors
- Three Towers Hike
- Abbots Way Walk
- Fellsman
