= Peak District Mountain Rescue Organisation =

Charity operating search and rescue missions

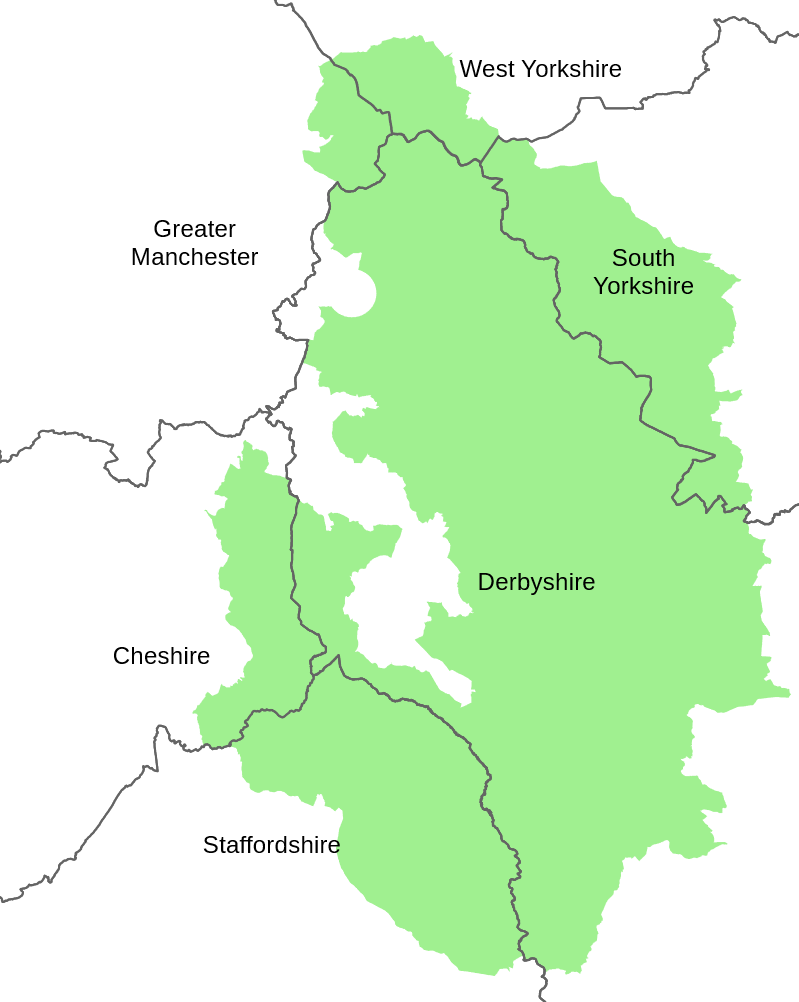
- Peak District National Park
- Abbreviation: PDMRO
- Formation: 1964
- Type: Charitable organisation
- Registration no.: Registered charity number: 506681
- Region served: England
- Website: Official website

The Peak District Mountain Rescue Organisation (PDMRO) is a UK registered charity which was formed in 1964. The purpose of PDMRO is "to save life and alleviate distress, primarily in Upland and Mountain areas". This is achieved by conducting search and rescue missions for walkers, climbers and missing persons in and around the Peak District National Park.

The PDMRO is an affiliation of the seven member Mountain Rescue Teams (MRT) which cover the Peak District. These are Buxton MRT, Derby MRT, Edale MRT, Glossop MRT, Kinder MRT, Oldham MRT and Woodhead MRT. The PDMRO coordinates all rescue incidents across the teams and develops common good rescue practices amongst them. PDMRO also has close links with Mountain Rescue Search Dogs England (MRSDE) and with Derbyshire Cave Rescue.

The organisation was established in 1964 in response to the death of two climbers caused by an avalanche in Wilderness Gully in the Chew Valley in 1963 and the deaths of three young scouts during the Four Inns Walk in 1964. Until the PDMRO was formed, there were only a few uncoordinated mountain rescue teams in the Peak District, using basic rescue equipment.

Previously, from 1938 until the 1960s, the RAF 28 Maintenance Unit was based at Harpur Hill in Buxton and it included the RAF Mountain Rescue Service for the Peak District. On 3 November 1948 the RAF team was called out to locate the US Air Force (USAF) Boeing RB-29A Superfortress which had crashed near Higher Shelf Stones on Bleaklow moor in the Peak District. All 13 crew perished in the tragedy and the crashed plane became known as the Bleaklow Bomber. Much of the wreckage is still visible at the crash site, where a memorial was erected in 1988.
