= Three Towers Hike =

Hiking competition in England

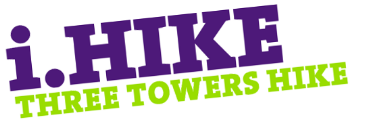
- Location: Berkshire/Oxfordshire
- Country: England
- Date: 1978-
- Website https://3towers.uk/

The Three Towers Hike is a Scouting-organised, downland hiking competition held annually in early spring, covering footpaths in West Berkshire and South Oxfordshire. It is organised by a team of scout leaders from Reading Central, Loddon, Taceham Hundred and Pang Valley Scout Districts, all of which are within the Scout County of Royal Berkshire of the Scout Association.

It is a competitive event, without an overnight camp (although teams must be equipped to bivouac if the conditions are severe enough to warrant it). It was first held as a senior event (Walkers over the age of 18) but now includes three other age groups.

== Scheduling ==
The hike usually takes place on the second or third Saturday in April, but this may vary depending on the timing of Easter. The event is next scheduled for 11th April 2026.

== History ==
The first Three Towers Hike took place during the 1970s, when only the Senior event was available. Originally, based around the North and West of Reading, the hike gets its name from the three large water towers that were passed.

In the 1980s, the route was significantly altered to include more rural paths in West Berkshire and South Oxfordshire.

Since its beginning, the Hike has run every year with few exceptions, the most notable being in 2001 due to Foot and Mouth concerns and 2020-3 due to the Covid Pandemic.

Officially not against the hike rules at the time, one team on the 2002 Junior Event swam across the River Thames during the race after finding themselves several miles up stream of the nearest bridge. The team then went on to complete the event but were later disqualified, and a new hike rule was added to prohibit this in the future.

== Events ==
The Hike currently comprises four different competitions, each of different lengths and following a slightly different route. The competitions are identified below.

- Explorer Plus Event: Introduced in 2023 as a rework of the Explorer event to utilise existing checkpoints. This new route is shorter than the original (26m / 42km). Although this new route does utilise existing checkpoints it also added 3 new ones to the event, Starveall, Aldworth and Kiddington Cottage
- Scout Event: The Scout Event was introduced in the 1990s for scouts aged up to 16 years (later reduced to 14). The Scout Event covers a distance of 27 km or about 17 miles. This event was known as the Junior Event from 1995 until 2007.
- Tim's Junket Event: In 2012, in honour of the Diamond Jubilee of Elizabeth II, a fifth event called the Jubilee event was held for one year only. This was an open event for teams aged 16 or over and covered just 15 km. This was to encourage participation, in the outdoors adventure that the hike tries to promote, for adults who didn't feel they could manage the Classic event. In 2013 a modified and extended version called the JubileePlus was held with a length of 20 km. As a memorial to the long-standing member of hike staff, Tim Jenkins, the JubileePlus was renamed Tim's Junket for future events. This event is open to all ages and particularly family groups.

=== Discontinued events ===
- ScoutPlus Event: The ScoutPlus Event was introduced in 2010 for Scouts aged 13 and 14. The ScoutPlus Event covered a distance of 40 km or about 24 miles. It was discontinued after 2016 due to a low level of uptake.
- Classic Event: This is the founding event, open to entries ages 15½ or older. The total length of the Classic Event is 70 km (43–45 miles) depending on route taken. This event was known as the Senior Event from 1995 until 2007. The Classic Hike Was Retired in 2023 (before the return from Covid) due to low participants
- Explorer Event: Following the popularity of the Scout Event, in 2003 the Explorer Event was added. This Event is open to any Explorer Scout or Ranger Guide aged at least 13½ but under 18 years. The Explorer Event covers a distance of 45 km, or around 28 miles. This original route Explorer Hike was Retired in 2023 alongside the retirement of the classic (as this would be the only event visiting the later checkpoints) but a new route was made for the explorer plus event that utilised existing checkpoints

== Routes and checkpoints ==
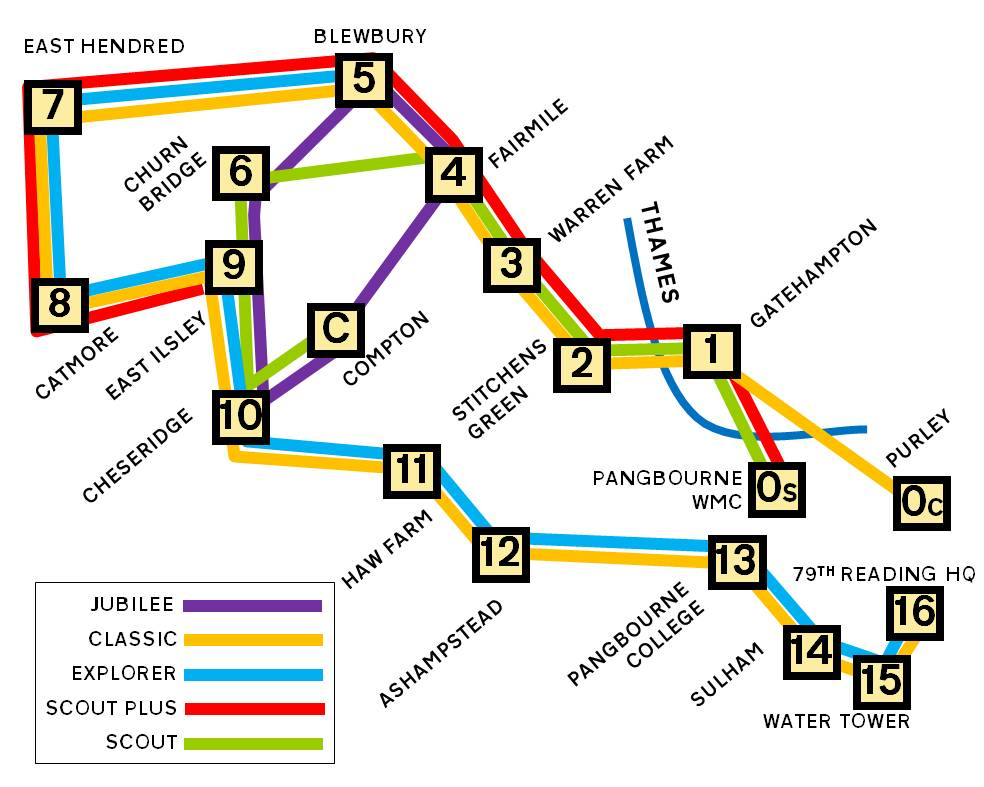
Hike route summary

The hike does not prescribe a specific route for hikers to use. It publishes a series of checkpoints from which a navigation exercise will deduce the best route to take. In most cases there is usually one obvious path, however, there are some sections where a choice can be made by the navigator.

- Purley: This is the start location for the Classic only. It is located in Purley-on-Thames
- Pangbourne Working Men's Club: This is the start location for the Scout event and is located in the village of Pangbourne.
- Gatehampton: This is the first checkpoint arrived at by Classic and Scout hikers. It is located near to the village of Goring-on-Thames.
- Stitchen's Green: This is the second checkpoint arrived at by Classic and Scout hikers.
- Warren Farm: This is the third checkpoint arrived at by Classic and Scout hikers. It is also a major refreshment and first aid point. The checkpoint is on part of The Ridgeway.
- Fairmile: This is an off-road checkpoint and fourth in sequence. It is visited by Classic and Scout hikers.
- Blewbury: This location was the start of the Explorer event until 2018, hikers having been transported out from Tilehurst. It is visited by Classic and Tim's Junket hikers. From 2013 it was no longer visited by Scout teams. It is located in the village of Blewbury.
- Churn Bridge: This off-road location was a new checkpoint for 2013 and is only for Scout teams. The location is by an old railway bridge that was once part of the DNSR.
- East Hendred: This location is visited by Classic and Explorer teams. It is located between Blewbury and Catmore on The Ridgeway
- Catmore: This location is visited by Classic and Explorer teams. It is located between East Hendred and East Ilsley in the tiny hamlet of Catmore.
- East Ilsley: This location is based at the Ilsleys Primary School in East Ilsley and is visited by all hikers. Prior to 2013 it was the end for Scout and Jubilee hikers.
- Cheseridge: This off-road location was a new checkpoint from 2013 and covers Tim's Junket and Scout routes. It is located between East Ilsley and Compton.
- Compton: This was a new location from 2013 based at Compton Scout HQ in the village of Compton in West Berkshire. It provides a finish location for Scout teams as well as a start and finish for Tim's Junket, from 2018 the Explorer hike also checks-in and starts here.
- Banterwick: This location is west of Hampsread Norreys and is for Explorer and Classic hikers.
- Haw Farm: This location just east of Hampstead Norreys is for Explorer and Classic hikers.
- Ashampstead: This off-road checkpoint location is for Explorer and Classic hikers. It is located between Haw Farm and Pangbourne College.
- Pangbourne College: This checkpoint is located at Pangbourne College and is for Explorer and Classic hikers.
- Sulham: This off-road location is for Explorer and Classic hikers.
- Water Tower: This landmark location is situated next to Tilehurst Water Tower for Explorer and Classic hikers.
- 79th Reading: This is the final location of the Explorer and Classic events. It is also the check-in location for the Classic event and is the main control centre for the Three Towers Hike.

== Event records ==
Records do not include times before 2003.

=== Classic ===
Category	Time	Team/Hiker	Year
Fastest Team	09:13	4 Years in the Making (63rd Reading)	2015
Fastest All Female Team	11:03	Jenny and the Pacemakers	2014
Fastest Individual (Full team didn't complete)	11:04	Callum Godding (63rd Reading)	2010
Slowest Finishing Individual	19:07	Andrew Harvey, David Marshall	2010

=== Explorer ===
Category	Time	Team/Hiker	Year
Fastest Team	06:20	It's all Callum's Fault (63rd Reading & 1st Finchampstead)	2014
Fastest All Female Team	09:30	Team 121 (Loddon District)	2007
Fastest Individual Female	07:20	Charlotte Judge	2014
Fastest Individual (Full team didn't complete)	09:01	Ryan Guerin	2011
Slowest Finishing Individual	14:49	Steven Milan, Jessica Paine	2003

=== ExplorerPlus ===
Category	Time	Team/Hiker	Year
Fastest Team			
Fastest All Female Team			
Fastest Individual (Full team didn't complete)			
Slowest Finishing Individual			

=== ScoutPlus ===
Category	Time	Team/Hiker	Year
Fastest Team	05:54	The Royal Academy Of Callum (63rd Reading & 1st Finchampstead Scouts)	2013
Fastest All Female Team	07:46	No Name Yet (1st Reading YMCA Scouts)	2011
Fastest Individual (Full team didn't complete)	08:48	Tanita Webb	2010
Slowest Finishing Individual	12:18	Kieran Tarry, Graham Mott	2010

=== Scout ===
Category	Time	Team/Hiker	Year
Fastest Team	04:13	Alexander Smith, Sam Moors, Dylan Jealouse, Joshua Taylor (1st Finchampstead)	2014
Fastest All Female Team	04:46	The Muppets (1st Burghfield and Sulhampstead)	2012
Fastest Individual (Full team didn't complete)	04:51	Mark Mills	2003
Slowest Finishing Individual	12:06	Annie Jackson, Joseph Knight, Lee Dickinson	2010

=== Jubilee Plus ===
Category	Time	Team/Hiker	Year
Fastest Team	03:14	Fiona Judge, Simon Hasler, Helen Hasler	2013
Fastest All Female	04:40	Samantha Sale, Jenny Whitfield, Tracey Hand	2013
Slowest Finishing Team	06:27	Dawn Garlick, Wendy Polden, Rachel Fitz-Desorgher, Jan Honey	2013

- Whisky 5 Alpha (5th Woodley Scouts) recorded a time of 04:14 in 2007, when the Scout event rules allowed for older teams.

== Marketing and branding ==
The Three Towers Hike has adopted the Scout Association's branding style including the use of the SerifBlack font family in Scout Purple and Green. Its self-developed i.Hike brand has raised the event's visibility and is now recognisable as part of the hike's identification.

== Tagline ==
The Three Towers Hike's tagline is "Outdoors, Challenge, Adventure". This was created to convey the core values of the competition.

== See also ==
- Scouting
- Ten Tors
- Four Inns Walk
