= Ten Tors =

Annual weekend hike in Dartmoor, southwest England

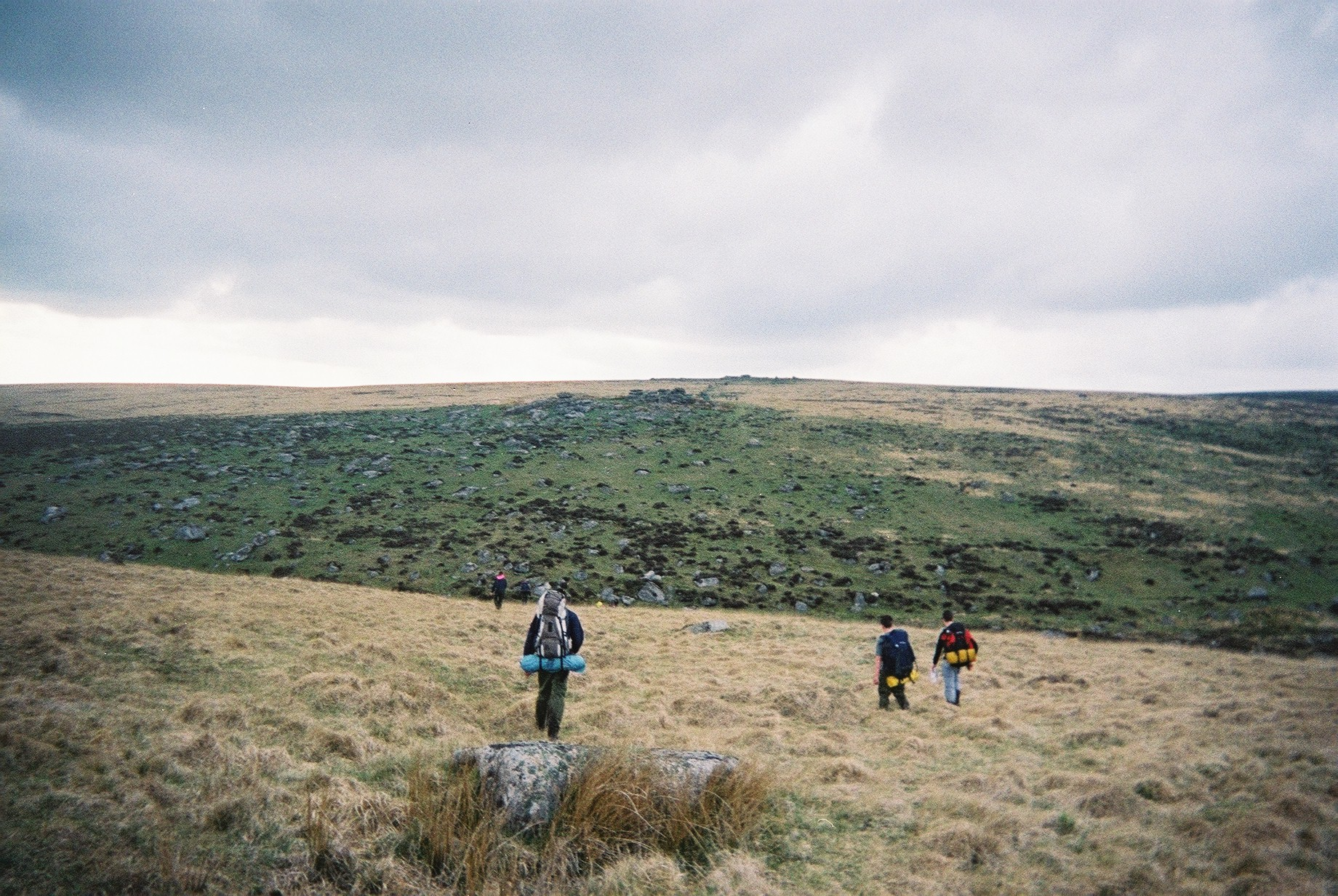
Team walking during the event

Ten Tors is an annual weekend hike in early May, on Dartmoor, southwest England. Organized by the British Army, starting in 1960, it brings together teams of six young people, with the 2,400 young participants hiking to checkpoints on ten specified tors. The majority of entrants are schools, colleges, Scout groups and Cadet squadrons from South West England, though groups from across the UK have regularly taken part, as have teams from Australia and New Zealand. However, starting in 2012, only teams from the South West of England are eligible to take part, due to the large numbers of entrants.

== Event format ==
Teams of six are required to visit ten specified tors and 5 to 10 via tors, these are required although not counted towards the 8 tor limit on the first day or your ten tors.; on the top of each tor is a checkpoint. Each team is required to visit all of the specified checkpoints in the correct order. Any member can choose to withdraw at a safety control, as long as there are 4 remaining participants; teams falling below this number could merge in earlier years, while later rules required a badly reduced team to forfeit.

There are 26 different routes over three different distances, lettered from A to Z, using a total of 19 different manned tors: 12 Bronze (Junior) routes of 35 miles (56 km) for those aged 14 to 15 years; 10 Silver (Intermediate) routes of 45 miles (72 km) for those aged 16 to 17 years; and 4 Gold (Senior or Arduous) routes of 55 miles (89 km) for those aged 18 to 19 years, or 17-year-olds who completed a Silver or Bronze route previously.

The organisers stress that the event is not a race – although teams often compete to see who can finish first – but a test of endurance, navigation and survival skills, because of not just the distances and the challenging terrain, but potentially also the weather; conditions on Dartmoor can vary considerably and change suddenly. In 1996, for example, the event was struck by a heavy snow storm, leading to some teams still being out on the moor a day after the event was due to have finished; while in 1998 temperatures reached 26 °C (79 °F).

Participants arrive at Okehampton Camp on the Thursday or Friday before the hike, watch a safety briefing video and have their equipment checked, a thorough process known as scrutineering. Teams must carry all their food, clothing, tents, stoves, fuel, navigation equipment, maps, emergency rations and a first aid kit; they also collect drinking water from the moor and use water purification tablets. Each team has a nominated team leader, who is responsible for ensuring that the team's route card is stamped at each of the ten tors.

All the teams start at 0700 on the Saturday from an area of flat land next to Anthony Stile, close to Okehampton Camp on the northern edge of Dartmoor. They stand in a semicircle and set off when a cannon fires. They have 34 hours to visit each of the ten tors on their route in the correct order. Teams must not pass through a checkpoint between 2200 on Saturday and 0600 on Sunday morning; nor may they pass the eighth tor until the Sunday. Those on 35 mile routes must camp at one of the manned tors on their route, while 45 and 55 mile teams may camp anywhere on the moor (minimum of 1 km away from any checkpoints). Teams must arrive back at Anthony Stile by 1700 on the Sunday, having visited all ten tors on their route in order, to qualify for a medal and complimentary pasty. Teams that finish the challenge as a complete six also receive a certificate.

== History of the event ==
The first Ten Tors Expedition took place in September 1960, with around 200 young people taking part. By 1980, the numbers had grown to more than 2,600. To protect the environment, the numbers are now limited to 2,400 individuals: 400 teams of four to six teenagers. The Army uses the event as a large scale logistics training exercise.

Until 1967, the event was organised by the Junior Leaders Regiment, Royal Corps of Signals. This responsibility passed to Headquarters South West District, and in 1986 to 43 (Wessex) Brigade, the regional Headquarters of the Territorial Army in the South West.

Since 1977, an additional event, The Jubilee Challenge, has been held for young people with physical or learning disabilities. This involves a selection of four routes of between 7.5 to 15 miles (12.1 to 24.1 km), both on road and cross-country.

Many military units and civilian groups provide support for this event and the Jubilee Challenge, including the Royal Wessex Yeomanry, Exeter UOTC, 243 Field Hospital RAMC, 6th Battalion The Rifles, two Sea King HC4 helicopters from 848 Naval Air Squadron, 39 (Skinners) Signal Regiment, two Gazelle helicopters from 7 Regiment Army Air Corps (Volunteers), Bristol UOTC, and the Dartmoor Rescue Group.

=== 1981 ===
The first ever Junior Army Team from Junior Leaders Regiment Royal Armoured Corps JLR RAC finished the Gold Course with 24 minutes to spare, despite several of the six-strong team having severe foot injuries. They were cheered home by an honour guard of Royal Marines and Paratroopers who walked with the boys over the last mile.

=== 1993 ===
Tavistock Times reports "Hurricane Force" winds during the event.

=== 1996 ===
A cold northerly wind on the Saturday of the 1996 event turned to rain and snow overnight. This continued through Sunday, accompanied by fog and driving wind. Requests from Tor party commanders, two of whom had their tents destroyed, added to pressure to abandon the event, and there was a mass evacuation of the moor on the Sunday afternoon, the first time the event had been terminated early. Fifty-one teams completed their routes, but no record remains of their success. Ten Tors, A History

=== 2001 ===
Ten Tors was cancelled in 2001 due to the foot and mouth epidemic, but went ahead the next year.

=== 2003 ===
(69% finished Complete, + 21% with fall-outs)

For the second year in succession the Plymouth DofE Award 45 team took the honour of leading the teams over the finish line, at 08:49 (Ten Tors Teams, 2003), improving on their time of 09:23 in 2002 (Ten Tors Teams, 2002)

=== 2004 ===
(75% finished Complete, + 17% with fall-outs)

In 2004, the Ten Tors record for earliest complete team home was broken by R1809, Dartmoor Plodders, with a time of 08:19. This stood until 2009.

=== 2005 ===
(52% finished Complete, + 29% with fall-outs)

In 2005, one of the original teams from the 1960 Ten Tors took part in the event, which was held on 14–15 May in particularly adverse weather conditions: constant rain on the Saturday, combined with a bitter wind, leading to an unusually high number of retirements.

=== 2006 ===
(76% finished Complete, + 17% with fall-outs)

In 2006, the event was held over the weekend of 13–14 May, with high temperatures on the Sunday resulting in several cases of dehydration.

=== 2007 ===
On Sunday 4 March 2007, Charlotte Shaw was swept away by the rain-swollen Walla Brook near Watern Tor, while training for the event. The rest of her group raised the alarm using a mobile phone, but despite her being evacuated by a Royal Navy helicopter within 20 minutes, she died later that night in Derriford Hospital, Plymouth. In December 2009 an inquest into the death was halted for the case to be considered for criminal charges. Several other groups were also evacuated by helicopter after weather conditions on Dartmoor deteriorated.

The event itself was abandoned at 21:30 on Saturday 12 May 2007, halfway through, due to severe weather conditions; the decision was influenced by the high drop-out rate of 15% on Saturday. Participants spent the night camped at a manned Tor, before being escorted off the moor by the military the following day.

=== 2008 ===
(61% finished Complete, + 25% with fall-outs)

From 2008, the event was much changed, with different routes and use of the moor to help bird conservation in the nesting season. Steeperton Tor and Hare Tor were dropped from the Tor list, and the pass from Dinger to Kitty Tor known as "Death Valley" was zoned off limits. Each team was permitted only four training walks on the north moor. A review of these changes was scheduled for 2011. The 2008 event was a total contrast to the previous years, with temperatures in the low 20s Celsius, and participants dropping out because of dehydration rather than hypothermia.

=== 2009 ===
(80% finished Complete, + 13% with fall-outs)

In 2009, the Ten Tors' record for the earliest complete team home since the rule change was broken with a time of 08:17 by 20th Torbay Explorer Scouts. For the first time, an all-girls team from Torquay Grammar School for Girls also broke the record for successfully completing the 35-, 45- and 55-mile events consecutively and with the same team members (Tamsin Owen, Joyce Nie, Francesca Hill, Amelia Skerritt, Rebecca Stanley, and Hannah Short). There were fewer dropouts than in other years in almost perfect weather conditions.

=== 2010 ===
(79% finished Complete, + 14% with fall-outs)

2010 saw the 50th anniversary of the Ten Tors event. To mark the occasion the Duke of Edinburgh visited the event on Sunday morning to speak to finishers and present some with the commemorative 50 years medals. It also marked the first year that teams carried a GPS tracker which enabled the organisers and team managers to track the participants' progress directly. The first finishers were 20th Torbay Explorer Scouts (Joshua Owen, Matthew Ryder, Luke Hayward, Jacob Shah, Paul Moroz, and William Fordyce) and King Edward's School Bath (Robert Wilcox, James Plumstead, Benjamin Smith, Edmond Venables (son of Stephen Venables), Jonathan Tracy, and Mark Humphreys) who walked over the line together at 7:37 to break the record for earliest finishers by 40 minutes, and also finishing four and a half hours ahead of any other team on their route. This also meant the scout group had crossed the line first for three consecutive years. Notable other finishers were the 'Denbury Boys' who, made up of men who completed the first ever Ten Tors, successfully completed the 35 mile event.

=== 2011 ===
(81% finished Complete, + 14% with fall-outs)

The 2011, Challenge started under a clear blue sky, but cloud obscured the tops of *West Mill and *High Willhays even then. Cloud and a fresh breeze built up through the day, but by 17:50, a blue sky was breaking through. Sunday was very similar with the first finishers (M1306 - Downend Scouts, at 08:35 Route M listing, 2011) walking in under a blue sky, but again the cloud gathered through the day. Notes from the Event.

The largely overcast and cool weekend was almost perfect walking weather - of the 390 teams which started 374 (95%) walked over the finish line, and of those finishing teams 316 (81%) walked in with all six team members. Over the last fifteen years of the event, this is the highest percentage of both Finishing and Complete teams. Sixteen teams either retired (just 7, less than 2%) or were 'crashed out', but even here the statistics are impressive – in the previous 15 years teams are noted as stopping at their second Tor onwards. In 2011, the first teams to stop reached their fifth Tor before doing so.

It was also the 60th anniversary of Dartmoor as a National Park so everyone received a participant certificate.

=== 2012 ===
(75% finished Complete, + 17% with fall-outs)

The first team to reach the finish line was the Torquay Boys' Grammar School 45-mile team, who reached camp at 8:56 am.

They were soon followed by both Torbay Explorer Scouts and Queen Elizabeth's Hospital School 45-mile team, who performed an excellent display of sportsmanship by finishing the last kilometre of the course side by side, despite a failure in the alarm of the QEH team, delaying the team by a full hour.

The first 35-mile team to cross the finish was Churcher's College, Hampshire, getting back to cap with a record breaking time of 09:21 on the Sunday morning. This was also the first all-boy team to cross the finish, and second overall.

The first all-girl team to reach the finish line, The Maynard 35-mile team, got back to camp at 10:20, setting a new time record for the school. The Maynard 45-mile team also completed the challenge in a respectable time, finishing at 13:59.

The 2012 event was notable for the selfless efforts of one team, X2414 Kingsbridge Community College (55), who were on schedule to complete their route shortly after 16:00 when they diverted to answer the distress whistles of another team which had two of its members trapped chest deep in Raybarrow Pool. After calling in the Dartmoor Rescue Group and helping the other team, X2414 walked in at 17:19, almost twenty minutes after the close of the event - this would normally debar a team from receiving their awards. The Director Ten Tors, Brigadier Piers Hankinson, met the team at the finish and presented Kingsbridge with their gold medals.

The event weather, following days of heavy rain, was cloudless, sunny, and warm with 100% visibility. Notes from the Event, 2012

=== 2013 ===
(23% of participants did not finish)

The 2013 event went down in Ten Tors history as one of the most miserable. Organisers said that if the weather had come a day earlier then the event would have been cancelled. Swollen rivers from rain over the previous weeks meant that river crossings were hazardous; teams were offered advice on the best places to cross by Dartmoor Mountain Rescue. Some young people stayed at river crossings for a number of hours, selflessly helping others to cross whilst putting their own chances of finishing on hold.

Especially on Saturday, navigation became extremely difficult as fog and mist reduced visibility to as low as 10 metres: a few less experienced 35 mile teams did not even make their first tor. The weather lifted overnight and gave teams a break from the rain, but this brought near-freezing temperatures across the whole moor. Throughout Sunday the weather worsened again.

Queen Elizabeth's Hospital School 45 mile team S1915 were the first team to make it across the finish line on the Sunday morning at 9:20.

Teams often choose odd dress code for crossing the finishing line. School uniform, kilts, miniskirts and Chinese dragons have all featured in the past. However, this year, the Launceston College 45 mile team decided to cross the line in brightly coloured morphsuits. Whilst the rain was beginning to lash down and the traditional Dartmoor high winds persisted, the team sacrificed their finishing time (12:15) to show the spirit and good humour that makes Ten Tors.

The finishing gate was left open for an extra 45 minutes. By 11:00 on Sunday morning, over 300 people had dropped out, and by the end of the day the number of people who would not complete had increased to over 500.

=== 2014 ===
(81% finished complete) The first team to finish was the 35 mile CCF team from Churcher's College, Petersfield, Hants. They came over the line at 8:24 am and was a mixed team: Olivia Hart, Francesca Hussell, Jerome Greig, Ben Kelson, Edward Rodge, and Owen Tutt, around 45 minutes ahead of all other teams. In the 55 mile event, Queen Elizabeth's Hospital School were the first to finish.

=== 2015 ===
(73.7% complete 18.9% with fall-outs)

This was the 55th anniversary of Ten Tors, and to celebrate this, two teams of veterans were given special permission to take part. They did one of the 55 mile routes on the 55th anniversary, all aged over 55 (some considerably so). Most of them had completed Ten Tors as teenagers in the 1970s whilst at Exeter School, but none had had the opportunity to do the 55 mile route. Apart from being too old, they followed all the rules, carrying all the same equipment as the young people. Both teams completed the challenge complete; fourteen veterans in all, albeit fairly late in the day on the Sunday.

=== 2016 ===
(73% complete 21 with fall-outs)

2016 saw warmer weather, getting up to 20 °C across the moor. The first team to cross the finish line was Torbay Scouts who took part in the 35-mile (56 km) route at 8:51. The first 55-mile team to cross the finish line was Colyton Grammar School. They crossed the finish line at 10:52, team consisting of: Matt Domhof, Frank Hartley, Charlie King, Zoe Kuyken, Ellie Marok, and Jonny Surtees (C).

The event also generated a light-hearted news story when the downdraught from a low-flying Royal Navy Merlin Mk3 helicopter blew away a row of portable toilets. They were not occupied at the time and there were no injuries.

Adults were awarded for long service to Ten Tors with 1 40+ Platinum award, 1 30+ Diamond award and 5 20+ gold awards, including Jack Barker, from the Erme and Yealm Hillwalking Club/Ivybridge Community College receiving the Platinum and Diamond; plus Paul Johnson & Peter Challiss from Tavistock & District Youth Forum, receiving Gold for 20yrs service.

=== 2017 ===
The event had the perfect weather conditions, with it not being too cold or too hot, leading to 84.9% of teams reaching the finish line complete. First to finish were 20th Torbay Scouts, arriving back at the base camp at 08:19 Sunday, followed by Torquay Boys' Grammar School B at 08:37, who finished almost an hour before anyone else on their route after walking for 2.5 hours. The first 55-mile team was that of Torquay Boys' Grammar School A, consisting of Joe Kingdon, Tom Snow, Matt Birdsall, Adam White, Harry Fox and Tom Gregory. They finished at 9:54, beating the previously held record for Route X, introduced in 2014, by 1hr35mins.

=== 2020 ===
Due to the COVID-19 pandemic, 2020 was one of the only years in the event's history (previously foot and mouth epidemic) that the event was cancelled unrelated to weather conditions. All prospective participants were given certificates for their efforts in training for the event.

=== 2023 ===
(91.2% of teams finished, 25.6% of teams finished with fall-outs, 8.8% of teams did not finish)

The 2023 Ten Tors event was a week earlier than usual, on the 28th-30 April, due to the King's coronation.

Jonathan Van-Tam gave a speech before the event started.

=== 2024 ===
Unusually high temperatures meant many participants crashed out due to heatstroke, with two 30-minute rest periods imposed during the event, one on each day. Ray Mears gave the commencement speech.

=== 2025 ===
Saturday started with skydivers and a helicopter flyover. Weather conditions were perfect for walking and remained that way for the whole of Saturday.

On Sunday the weather was clouded over and a little on the cold side, with strong breezes. At around 11:30 it began to rain and continued for the majority of the day.

=== 2026 ===
The weather was generally favourable apart from a strong gusty wind that started at around 2pm on Saturday and continued overnight until about 10am Sunday morning.

== Staffed locations ==
The tors and other locations used as checkpoints on the Ten Tors challenge in 2013 were as follows, but incremental changes were made from 2014 to 2020 event, and all changed for the 2024 when all checkpoints south of the Postbridge-Merrivale Road were removed. From 2027, teams on 45- and 55-mile routes will, once again, visit checkpoints south of the Postbridge-Merrivale Road.

- Beardown Tors, 2 km N of Two Bridges
- Black Tor, just off the B3212 between Princetown and Yelverton. Removed in 2014.
- Coombestone Tor, on the road between Holne and Hexworthy. Removed in 2014.
- Chat Tor, 3 km E of the Dartmoor Inn, near Lydford, removed again in 2022, back to Hare Tor
- Great Mis Tor, 2 km NE of Merrivale. Replaced by Little Mis Tor in 2014.
- Hartor Tor, 3 km E of the car park at Sheepstor Brook
- Hound Tor, 5 km S of Belstone (not the Hound Tor near Hay Tor)
- Oke Tor, 4 km S of Belstone
- Kitty Tor,5 km SE of Sourton. Removed in 2014.
- Lynch Tor, 5 km E of Horndon (a hamlet near Mary Tavy). Replaced by Standon Farm SC in 2014.
- Higher White Tor - changed from Lower White Tor due to Rare Bird Nesting Areas

Higher Tor for the 1st time in 2025

- Peat Cot (removed for 2024)
- Puper's Hill, 3 km W of Scorriton - not actually a Tor but used due to a lack of tors on the south eastern side of the moor
- Shilstone Tor, on a minor road near Throwleigh. Removed in 2014, returned for 2024 one of the Tor party did Ten Tors in 2003
- Sittaford Tor, 4 km N of Postbridge
- Sourton Tors, 1 km E of Sourton
- South Hessary Tor, 1 km S of Princetown. Replaced by Peat Cot from 2014.
- Staple Tors, 1 km N of Merrivale. Replaced by Middle Staple Tor from 2014.
- Trowlesworthy Tor, 3 km E of Cadover Bridge. Removed in 2014.
- Watern Tor, 7 km S of Belstone.

All the above tors are staffed by volunteers: ten are staffed by personnel from the Royal Air Force and nine by Royal Navy colleagues.

The following tors were removed in certain years because of bird nesting, then reinstated as surveys of bird nesting areas were updated:

- Hare Tor (Replaced by Chat Tor), replaced by Hare Tor 2020
- Steeperton Tor (Replaced by Hound Tor)
- East Mill Tor (Replaced by Oke Tor)

All tors on the south moor were removed after 2014, replaced by Peat Cot, south of Princetown, and new Safety Checkpoints were put in place to ensure the safety of participants, providing road access to the checkpoint for potential drop outs during the event.

New Checkpoints/Safety Checkpoints for the event from 2014 onwards are: Revised for the 2020 event, buy a Ten Tors 60 badge and 2020 diamond 60 flash (not from the Army) 2024 date year flashes were for sale as usual.

- Cosdon Beacon OUT but back for the 2024 event

Buttern Hill called Buttern Tor in; Crow Tor IN out for 2024

- Dinger Tor
- Fernworthy
- Great Kneeset
- High Willhays
- Holming Beam
- Kes Tor
- Little Mis Tor

Longaford Tor IN

- Middle Staple Tor
- Nodden Gate manned by a ex TT participant in 2024.
- Okement Hill
- Peat Cot
- Postbridge
- Prewley Moor
- Standon Farm
- Water Hill
- White Barrow

== Ten Tors Prayer ==
Every year before the start of the event the following prayer is read.

O God, who has made the earth of great beauty
and instilled in man a spirit for adventure,
we thank you for the beauty of nature
for the courage and vigour of youth
for companionship
and for the opportunity to enjoy these gifts

Go, we pray, with all who are setting out
on this great venture
among the tors of a unique and ancient moorland.
Grant that, by meeting each challenge and difficulty
with honest endeavour and unselfish courage
they may find a spirit of determination and
true comradeship
that will benefit themselves and those about them
both now and in the future.

Amen

== Jubilee Challenge ==
The Jubilee Challenge is a one-day event for those with mental and/or physical disabilities.

== See also ==
- Four Inns Walk – a 45-mile (72 km) competitive event in the Northern Peak District, often attempted by young adults, as well as other teams of fit, experienced walkers
- Three Towers Hike – a hiking event with three hikes of varying lengths held in West Berkshire and Southern Oxfordshire.

Abbots Way Walk is 63ys old in 2025 on Sunday 5th Oct.
