= Cat and Fiddle Inn =

Former public house in the English Peak District

Coordinates: 53.2441°N 1.9997°W

The Cat and Fiddle Inn is a former public house in the English Peak District, in Cheshire, close to the border with Derbyshire. It sits on the A537 road from Macclesfield to Buxton, which runs across a high and remote area of moorland. A section of the road is known as the "Cat and Fiddle Road" after the inn. The building is some 1,689 feet (515 m) above sea level, and it was the second-highest public house in Britain before it closed in 2015 (the Tan Hill Inn in Yorkshire is slightly higher). In 2020, it reopened as a distillery, shop and bar.

== History ==
The Cat and Fiddle first opened in 1813. It was for many years the final checkpoint of the Four Inns Walk, an annual fell race organised by the Scout Association. Its future as a pub was cast into doubt after it was shuttered by Robinsons Brewery in 2015. It remained empty until 2019, when the Forest Distillery took out a long-term lease on the property. A crowdfunding appeal raised over £50,000 towards the restoration of the building, and it reopened in the summer of 2020 as a shop and bar selling Forest Distillery products. Gin and whisky are also now distilled on site.

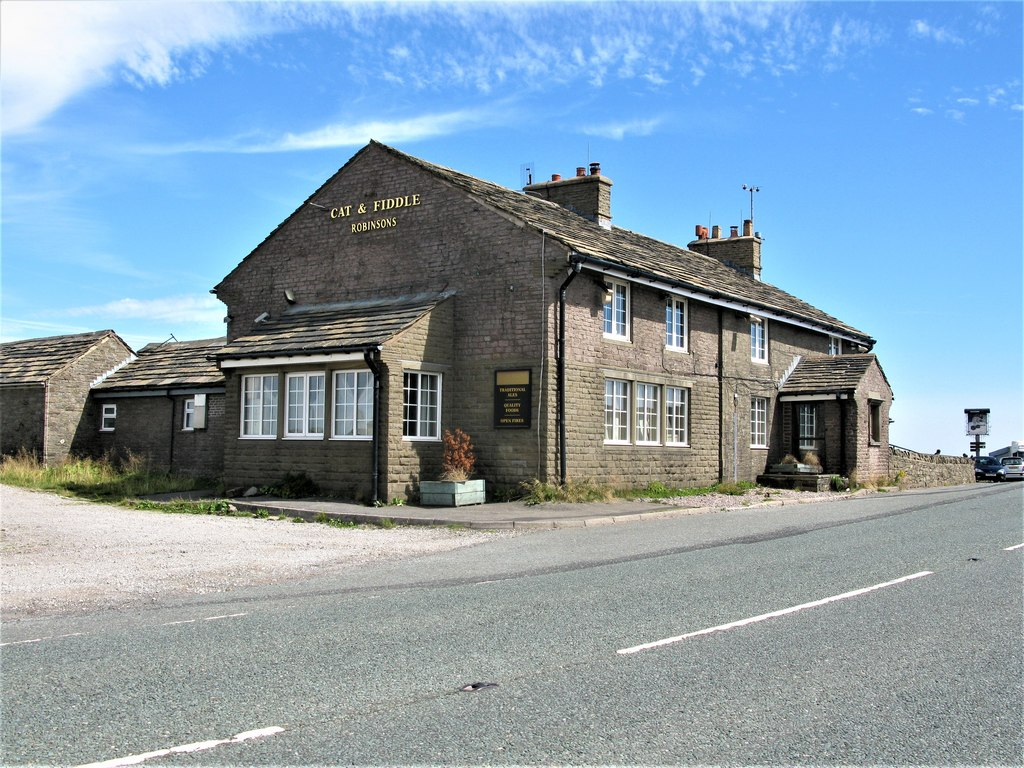
Western view of the Cat and Fiddle (2018)

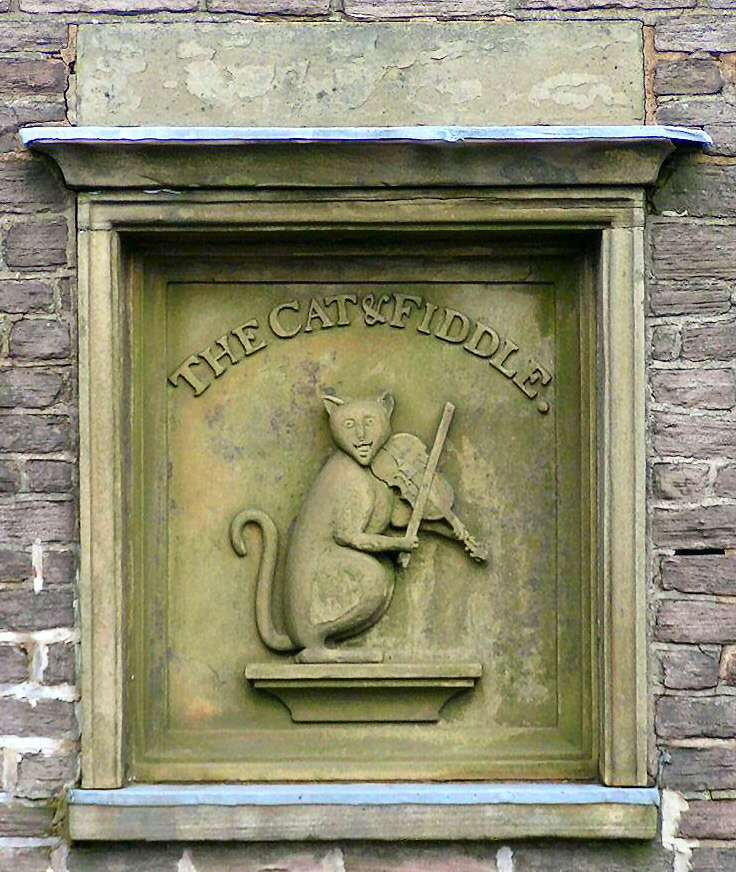

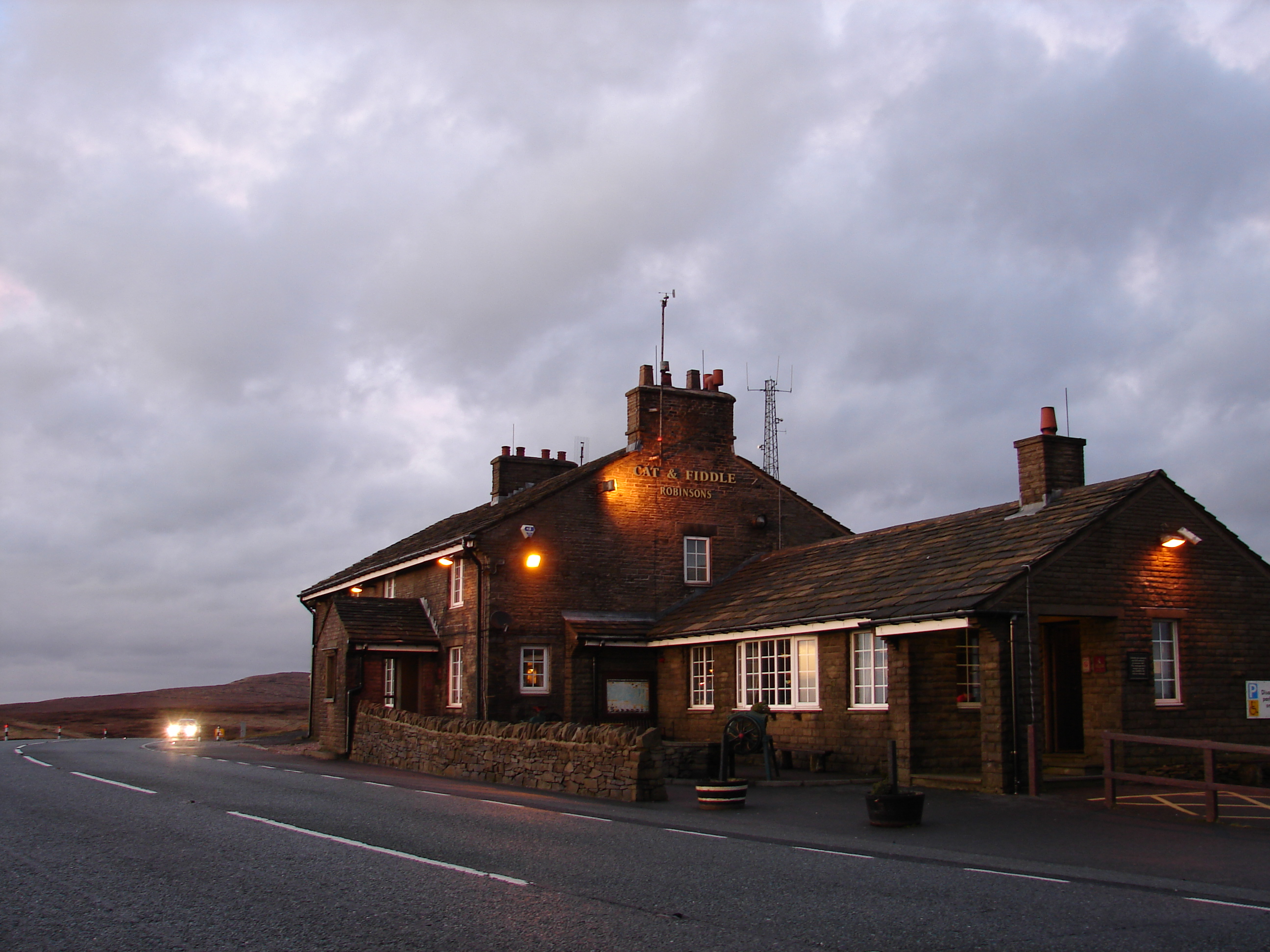
Eastern view (2011)
