= Kinder Scout =

Mountain in northern England

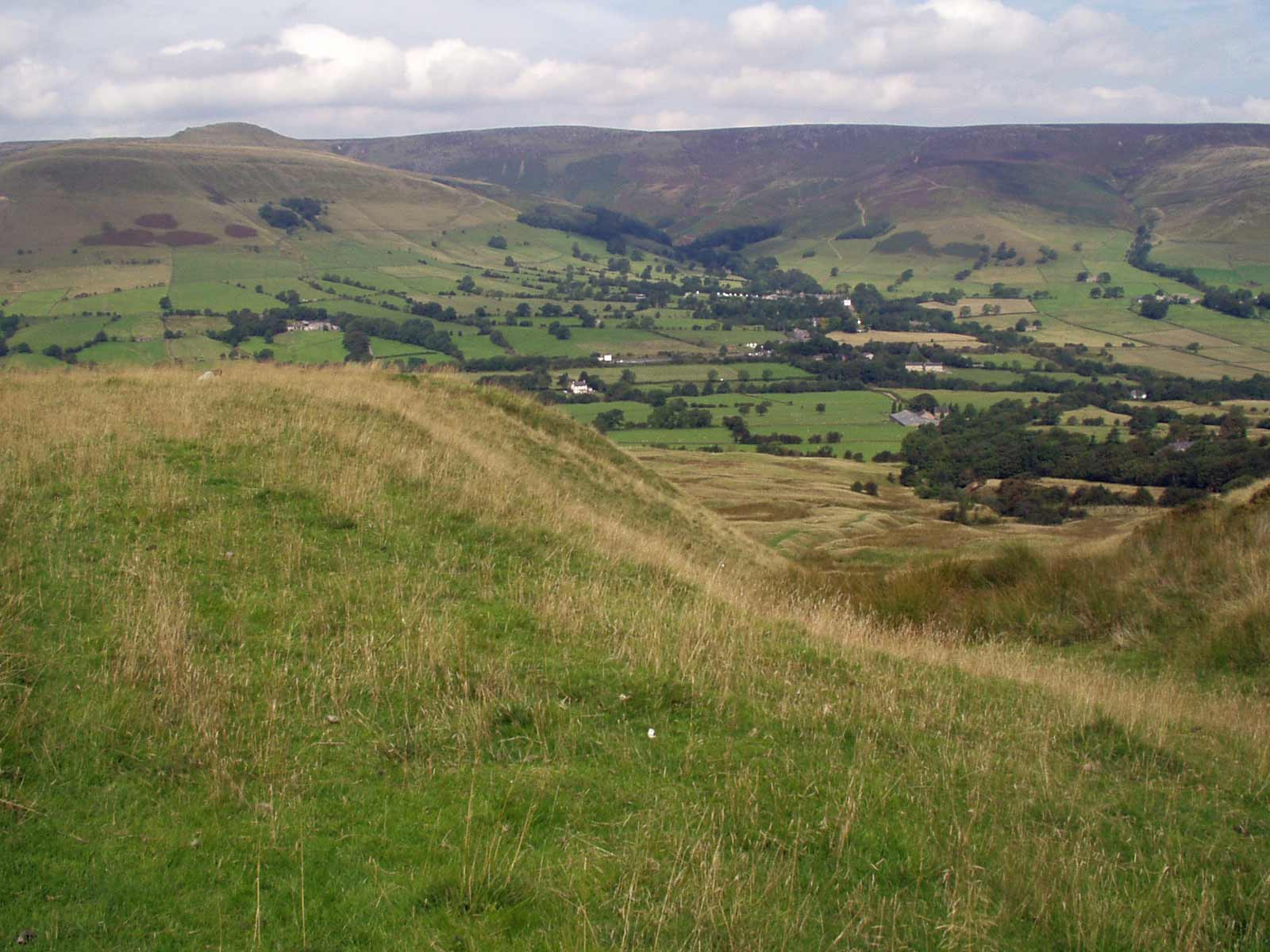
- The Kinder plateau seen from the south

Highest point
- Elevation: 636 m (2,087 ft)
- Prominence: 496.6 m (1,629 ft)
- Parent peak: Cross Fell
- Listing: Marilyn, Hewitt, Hardy, county top, Nuttall
- Coordinates: 53°23′05″N 1°52′26″W

Naming
- Language of name: Old Norse
- Pronunciation: /ˈkɪndər ˈskaʊt/

Geography
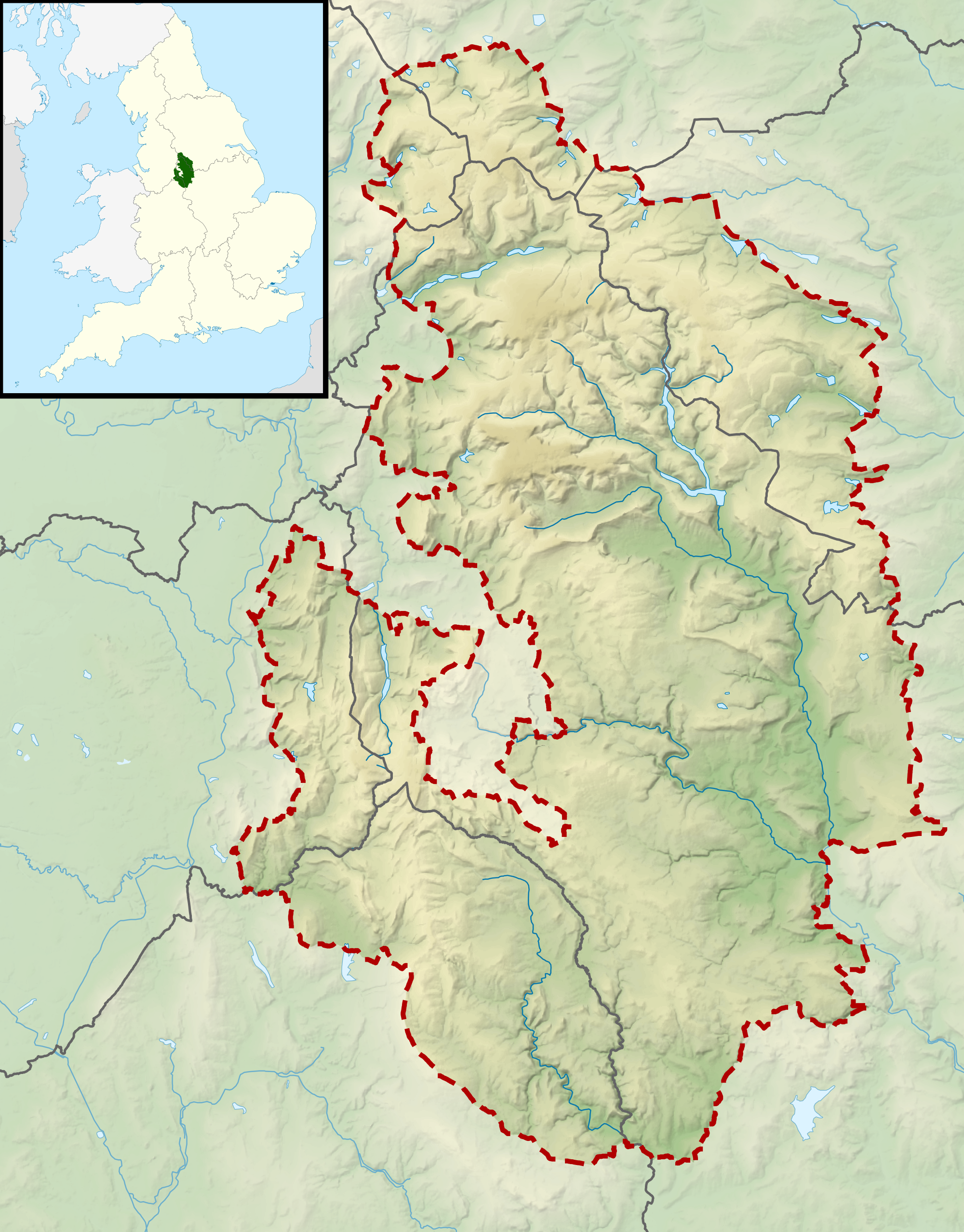
- Location within the Peak District Location within Derbyshire
- Location: Derbyshire, England
- Parent range: Peak District
- OS grid: SK084875
- Topo map: OS Landranger 110

Kinder Scout is a moorland plateau and National Nature Reserve in the Dark Peak of the Derbyshire Peak District in England. Part of the moor, at 636 metres (2,087 ft) above sea level, is the highest point in the Peak District, in Derbyshire and the East Midlands.

== Overview ==
Kinder Scout is part of the Dark Peak Site of Special Scientific Interest, and part of the plateau was designated as a National Nature Reserve in 2009. Much of the area is owned and managed by the National Trust as part of its High Peak Estate. The city of Manchester and the Greater Manchester conurbation can be seen from the western edges, as can Winter Hill near Bolton and, in good weather, the mountains of Snowdonia in North Wales. To the north, across the Snake Pass, lie the high moors of Bleaklow and Black Hill, which are of similar elevation; the Pennine Way long-distance footpath crosses the three hills on its route from nearby Edale to Kirk Yetholm in Scotland.

Kinder Scout featured on the BBC television programme Seven Natural Wonders (2005) as one of the wonders of the Midlands; however, it is considered by many to be in Northern England, lying between the cities of Manchester and Sheffield. In chronostratigraphy, the British sub-stage of the Carboniferous period, the Kinderscoutian, derives its name from Kinder Scout. In an early text this summit was identified as "the Peak", and the whole area is often referred to locally as "The Peak" or "The Peaks".

The Aetherius Society considers it to be one of its 19 holy mountains.

== Etymology ==
The name "Kinder" was first recorded in the Domesday Survey of 1086 as Chendre, and is of obscure meaning. It is believed to be pre-English in origin. "Scout" is an old word for a high, overhanging rock (derived from the Norse skúte), and refers to the cliffs on the western side of the plateau.

== Public access ==
Kinder Scout is accessible from the villages of Hayfield and Edale in the High Peak of Derbyshire. It is a popular hiking location and the Pennine Way crosses Kinder Scout and the moors to the north. This has resulted in the erosion of the underlying peat, prompting work by Derbyshire County Council and the Peak District National Park Authority to repair it, in conjunction with the landowner, the National Trust. The Four Inns Walk, a competitive hiking event, crosses over Kinder Scout.

The plateau was the location of the Kinder Scout Mass Trespass in 1932. From the National Park's inception, a large area of the high moorland north of Edale was designated as "open country". In 2003, the "right to roam" on uncultivated land was enshrined into law, and this area of open country has been significantly extended.

Parts of the Kinder Scout plateau (except legal rights of way) are still occasionally closed for conservation, public safety, grouse shooting or fire prevention reasons, but prior notice is generally given on the Peak District National Park Authority's website.

== Landmarks ==
=== Kinder Downfall ===
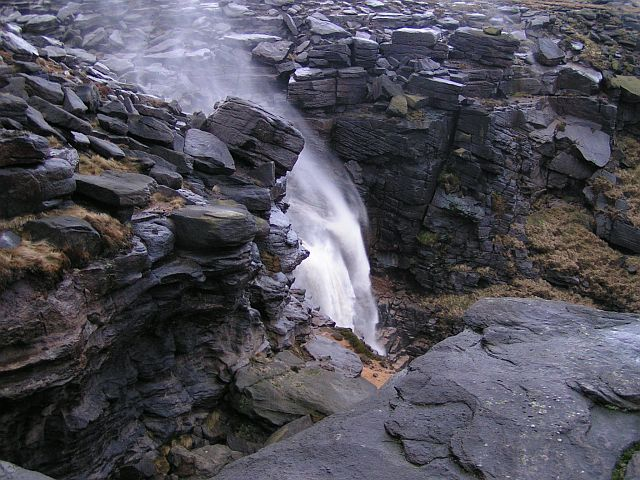
Kinder Downfall in spate

Kinder Downfall is the tallest waterfall in the Peak District, with a 30-metre fall. It lies on the River Kinder, where it flows west over one of the gritstone cliffs on the plateau edge. Although usually little more than a trickle in summer, in spate conditions it is impressive. In certain wind conditions (notably when there is a strong westerly wind), the water is blown back on itself, and the resulting cloud of spray can be seen from several miles away. In cold winters the waterfall freezes providing local mountaineers with an icy challenge that can be climbed with ice axes, ropes and crampons. Below the Downfall the River Kinder flows into Kinder Reservoir.

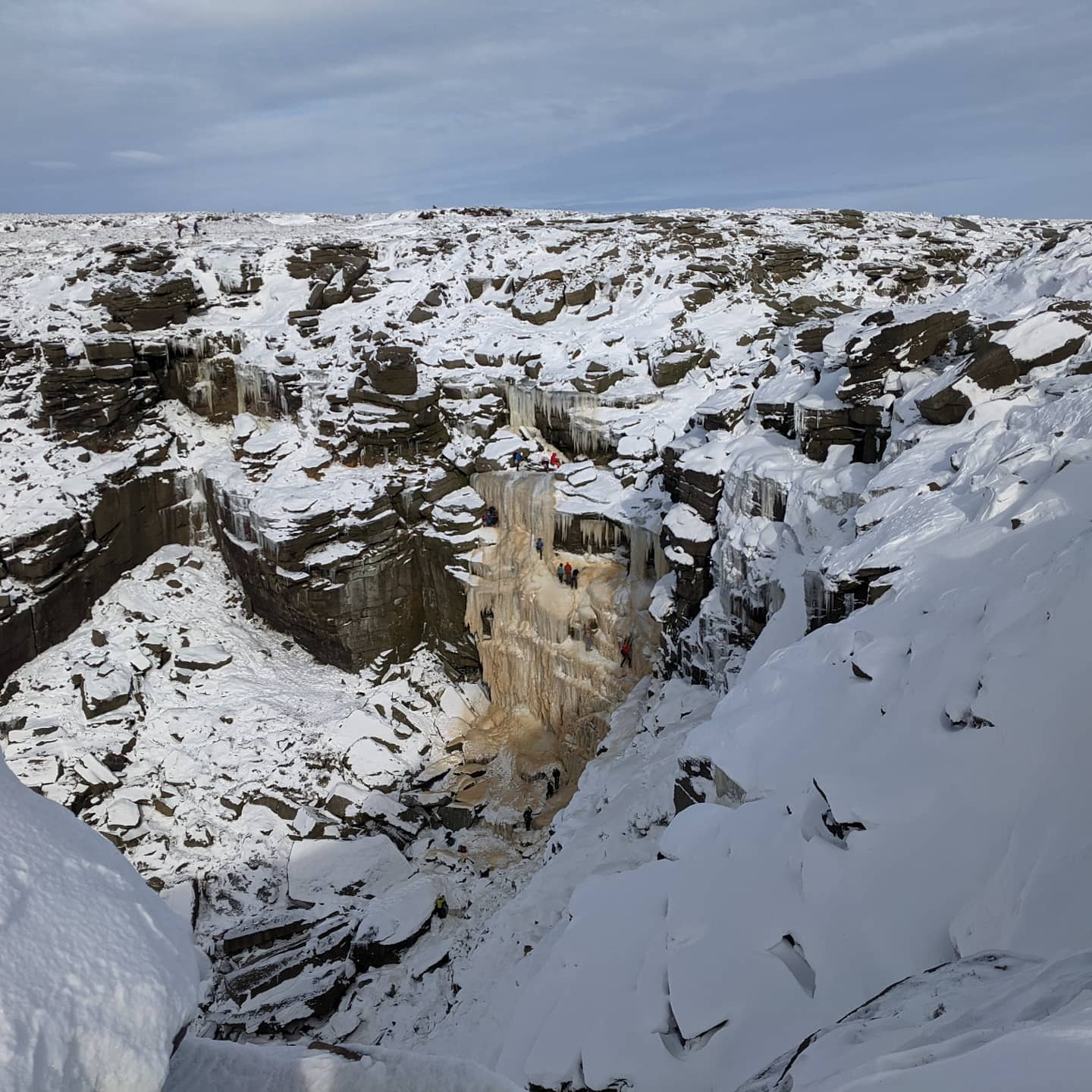
Kinder Downfall frozen in winter

=== Jacob's Ladder ===
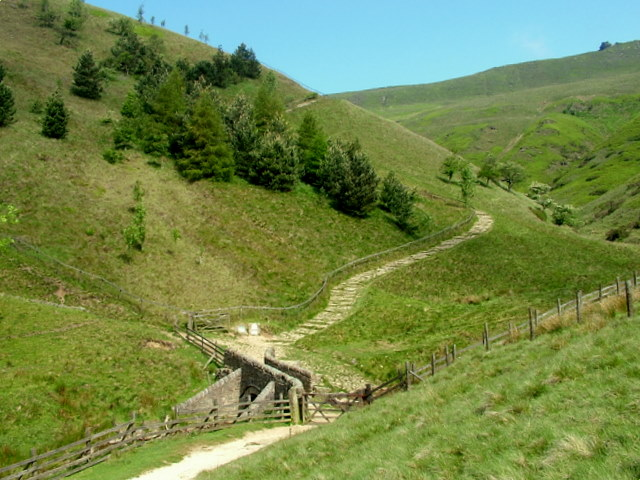
Packhorse bridge at the foot of Jacob's Ladder

Jacob's Ladder is a bridleway between the Kinder Scout plateau and the hamlet of Upper Booth in the Vale of Edale. In the 18th century, Jacob Marshall farmed the land at Edale Head, at the top of what became known as Jacob's Ladder. He cut steps into this steep section of the route up to the Kinder plateau. The name is a reference to the ladder to heaven that Jacob dreamt about (in the Book of Genesis).

The River Noe (a tributary to the River Derwent) flows alongside the path from its source at Edale Head down the clough (steep valley). At the foot of Jacob's Ladder the Noe is crossed by a Grade II listed gritstone packhorse bridge, with a single span. The bridge is on an important medieval packhorse route over the Pennine moorland between Hayfield and Edale. Salt and cheese from Cheshire and cotton from the Lancashire mills were transported to the east, while coal and lead were carried to the west.

The Pennine Way ascends Jacob's Ladder just 2.5 miles (4.0 km) from its start at Edale. The original route of the Pennine Way went up to the Kinder plateau via Grindsbrook Clough. In 1987 the Manpower Services Commission built a stone paved staircase along the path of Jacob's Ladder. The Jacob's Ladder footpath runs across land that is owned and managed by the National Trust. Access to the foot of Jacob's Ladder can be made along the Pennine Way trail from Edale railway station or from the public car park at Barber Booth.

=== The gritstone edges ===
Some of Kinder's many gritstone cliffs were featured in the first rock-climbing guide to the Peak District, Some Gritstone Climbs, published in 1913 and written by John Laycock.

=== Edale Cross ===
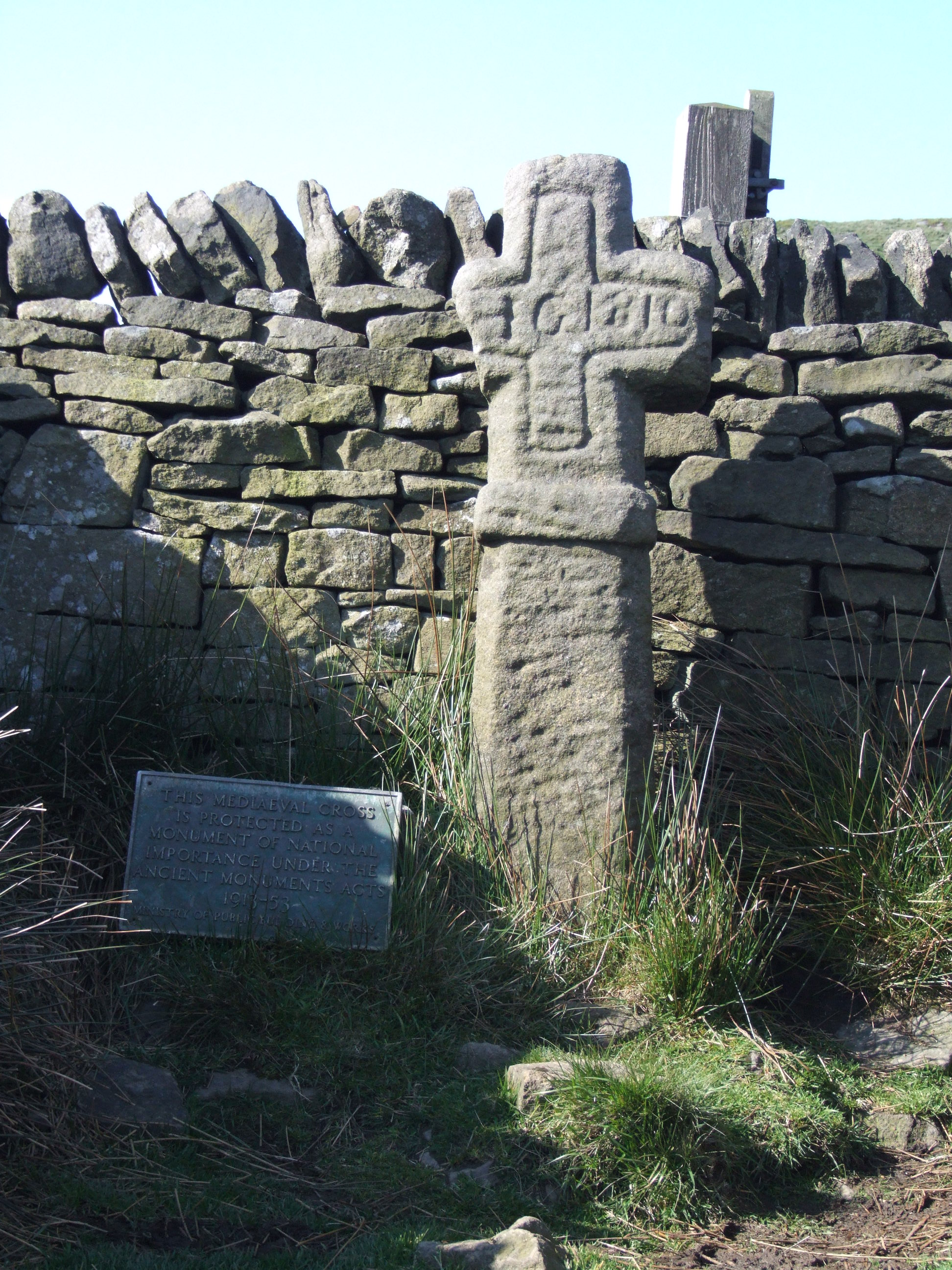
Edale Cross

The Edale Cross lies immediately south of Kinder Scout, under Kinder Low and on the former Hayfield to Edale road. It marks the former junction of the three wards of the Forest of Peak: Glossop and Longdendale, Hopedale and Campagna. The first cross on the site may have been set up by the Abbots of Basingwerk Abbey to mark the southern boundary of their land, granted in 1157. The date of the current cross is unknown, although an adjoining plaque and its listing as a Scheduled Monument date it to the medieval period. At some point it fell down, and was re-erected in 1810, when the date and initials JG, WD, GH, JH and JS were carved into it. These stand for John Gee, William Drinkwater, George and Joseph Hadfield and John Shirt, local farmers of the day who raised the cross.

=== Mermaid's Pool ===
Mermaid's Pool, a small pool below Kinder Downfall, is associated with a mermaid tradition documented in nineteenth- and early-twentieth-century sources. Easter visits to the pool were made in hopes of seeing the mermaid, and some versions held that a sighting conferred immortality.

=== Kinder Low ===
Kinder Low at 633 metres (2,077 ft) above sea level is a subsidiary summit at the south west corner of the plateau. Surmounted by a trig point and with steep slopes to south and west it is often mistaken as the highest point. The true summit, which is 3 metres (9.8 ft) higher, is an unmarked point on the flat plateau 900 metres (3,000 ft) to the north east. "Low" is an old dialect word meaning "hill top".

=== Kinderlow bowl barrow ===
A bowl barrow, thought to be unexcavated and to date from the Bronze Age, stands on Kinder Low, a western projection of the main massif above Hayfield.

== View ==
Major English and Welsh peaks visible (in ideal conditions) from Kinder Scout include (clockwise from west) Winter Hill (50 km, 31 mi), Pendle Hill (61 km, 38 mi), Ingleborough (93 km, 58 mi), Whernside (100 km, 62 mi), Pen-y-ghent (90 km, 56 mi), Fountains Fell (87 km, 54 mi), Buckden Pike (92 km, 57 mi), Great Whernside (87 km, 54 mi), Bleaklow (8 km, 5 mi), Margery Hill (13 km, 8 mi), the Weaver Hills (42 km, 26 mi), Axe Edge (18 km, 11 mi), The Roaches (26 km, 16 mi), Shutlingsloe (21 km, 13 mi), Shining Tor (16 km, 10 mi), the Long Mynd (114 km, 71 mi), Stiperstones (114 km, 71 mi), Corndon Hill (119 km, 74 mi), Cilfaesty Hill (142 km, 88 mi), Moel y Golfa (109 km, 68 mi), Plynlimon (164 km, 102 mi), Cadair Berwyn (116 km, 72 mi), Beeston Castle (61 km, 38 mi), Alderley Edge (24 km, 15 mi), Arenig Fawr (135 km, 84 mi), Moel Famau (97 km, 60 mi), Snowdon (151 km, 94 mi), Glyder Fach (146 km, 91 mi), Tryfan (145 km, 90 mi), Y Garn (148 km, 92 mi), Carnedd Llewelyn (142 km, 88 mi) and Foel-fras (140 km, 87 mi).

== Tone poem ==
The orchestral sketch Kinder Scout was composed by Patrick Hadley, written for the Buxton Spa Orchestra and its occasional director George Cathie. It was first performed in Buxton in September 1923. Hadley had an emotional attachment to the Derbyshire peaks, which are also celebrated in his later cantata The Hills (1943).

== See also ==
- Pennines
- Rambling

== Bibliography ==
- Douglas, Ed; Beatty, John (2018). Kinder Scout: The People's Mountain (1st ed.). Vertebrate Publishing. ISBN 978-1911342502.
- Smith, Roly, ed. (2001). Kinder Scout: Portrait of a Mountain (1st ed.). Derbyshire County Council Libraries and Heritage Department. ISBN 0903463687.

== Picture gallery ==
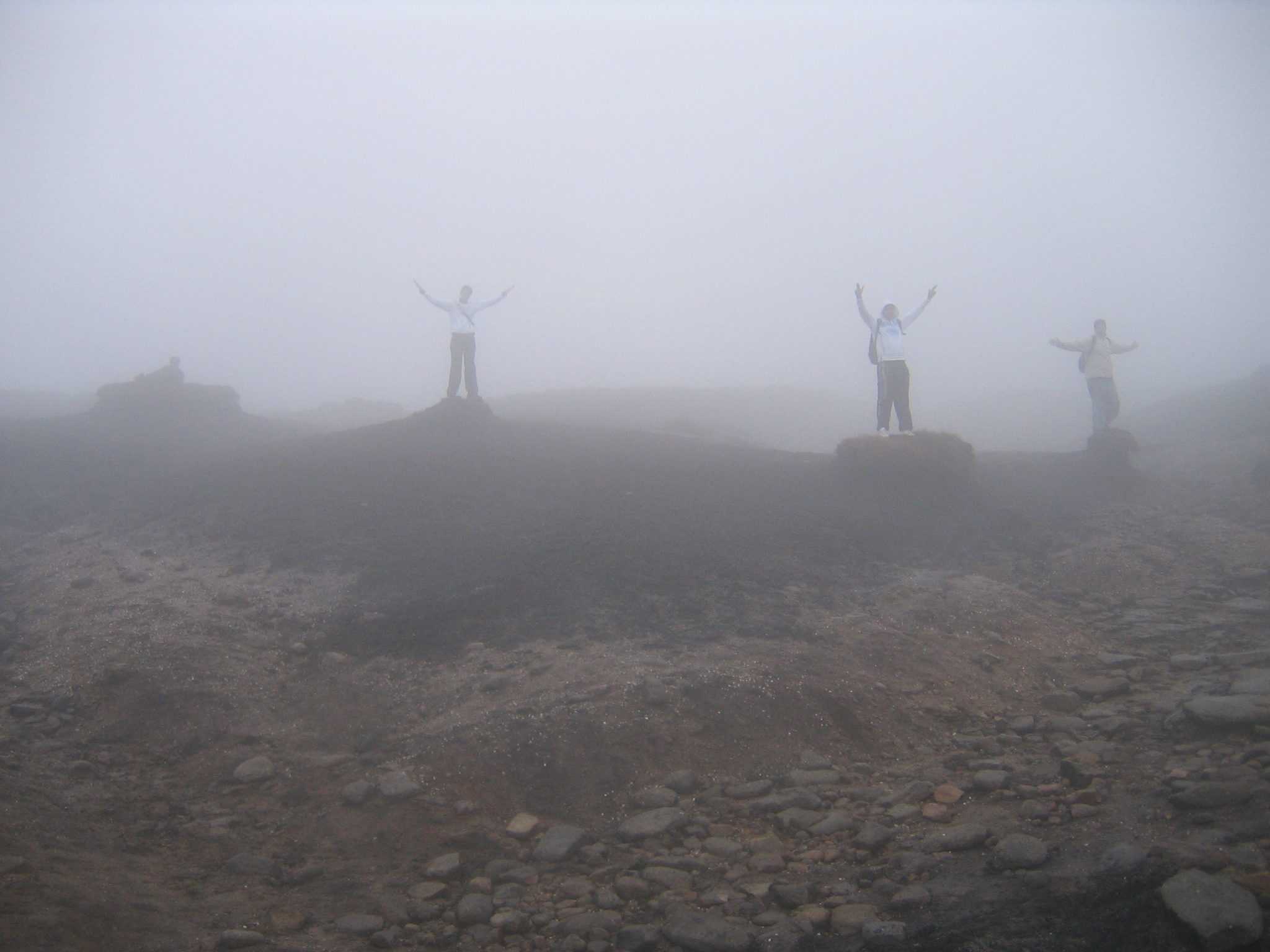
Poor visibility near the summit

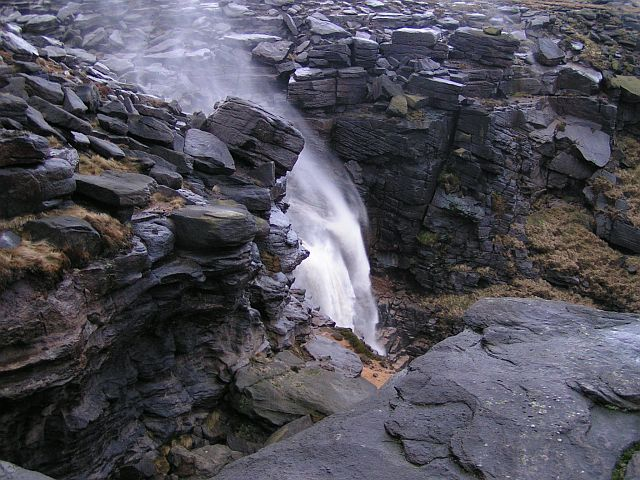
Kinder Downfall

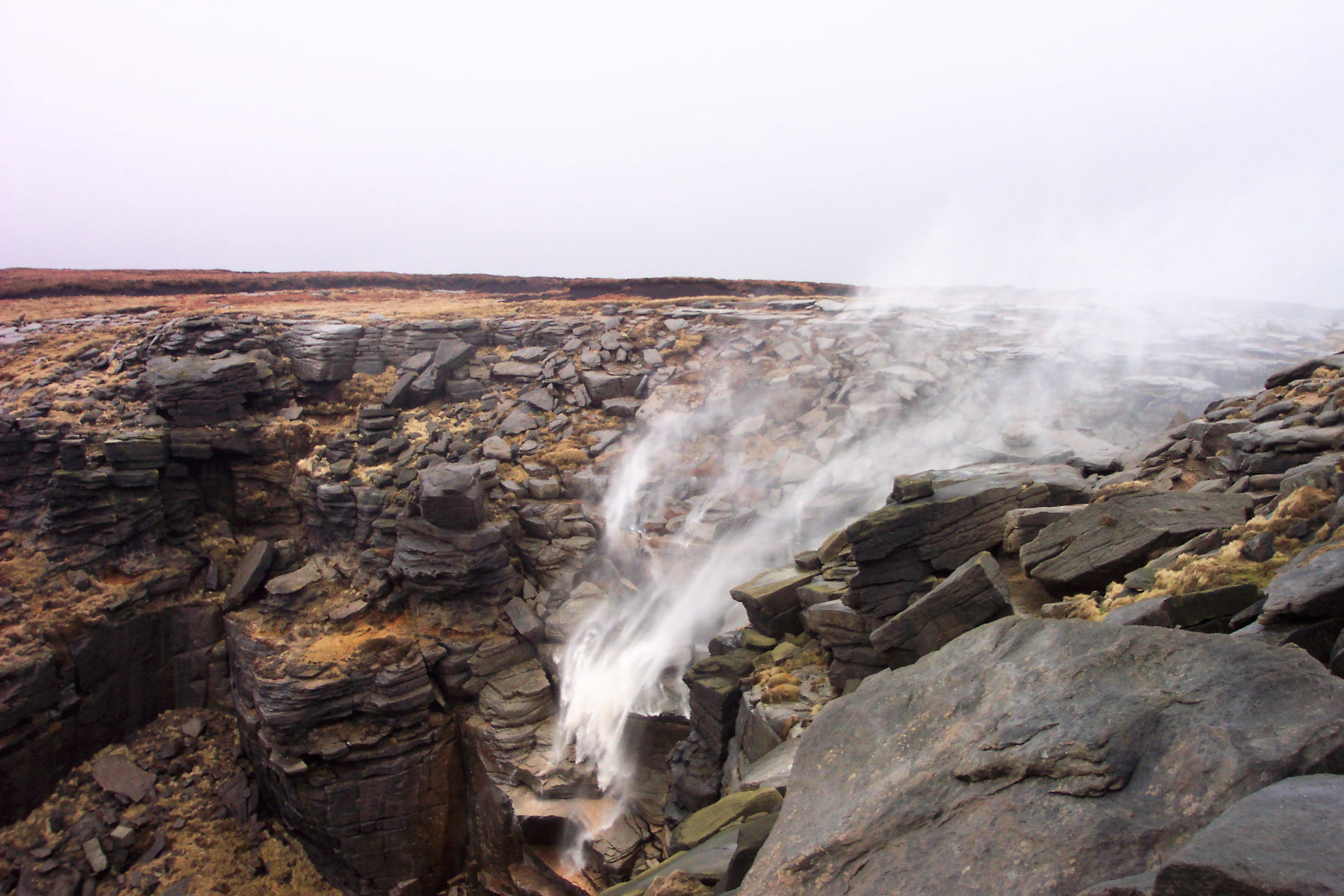
Kinder Downfall in strong westerly wind

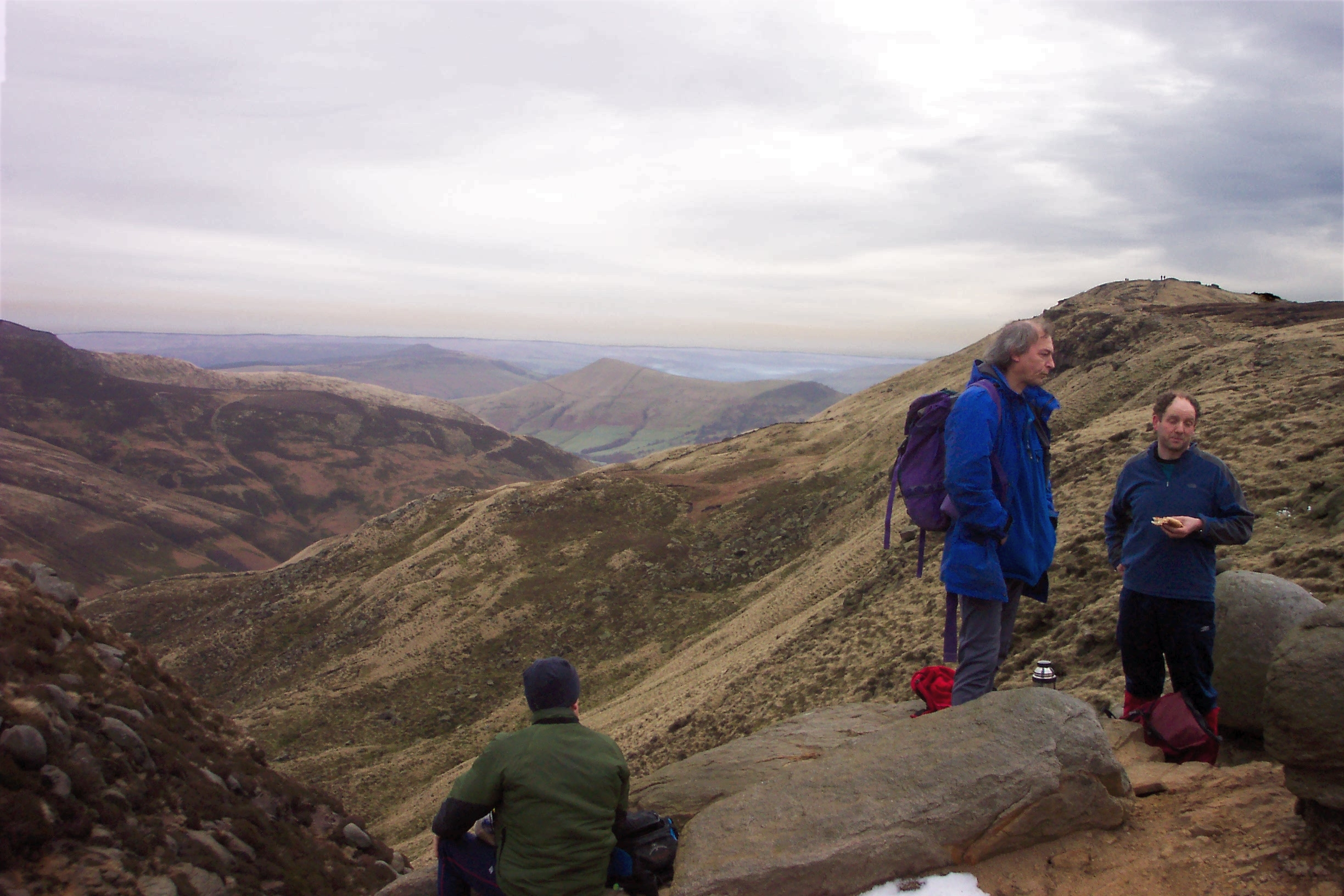
Head of Grindsbrook

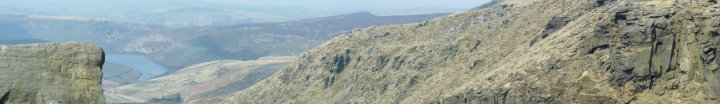
Panoramic view over Kinder Reservoir from Kinder

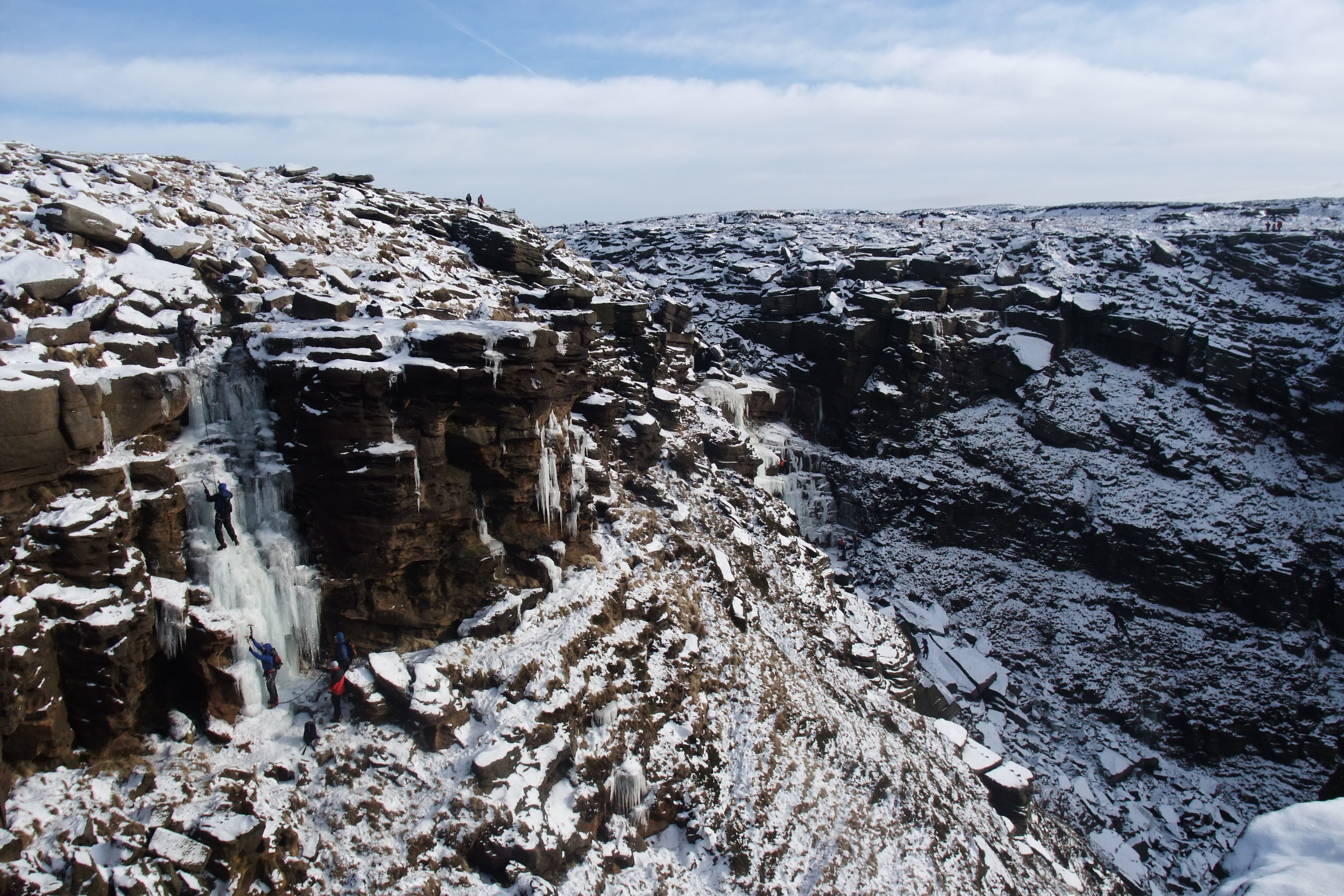
Ice climbers on Kinder Downfall
