= Bleaklow =

Gritstone moorland in the Derbyshire High Peak

Bleaklow Head
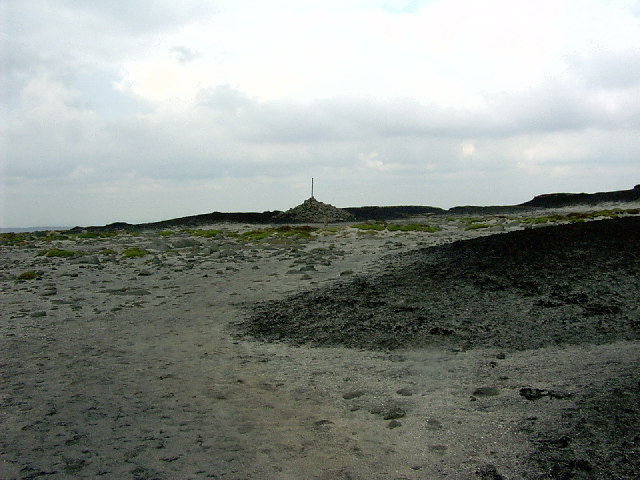
- The boggy "summit" of Bleaklow

Highest point
- Elevation: 633 m (2,077 ft)
- Prominence: 128 m
- Parent peak: Kinder Scout
- Listing: Hewitt, Nuttall, HuMP
- Coordinates: 53.4600°N 1.8626°W

Geography
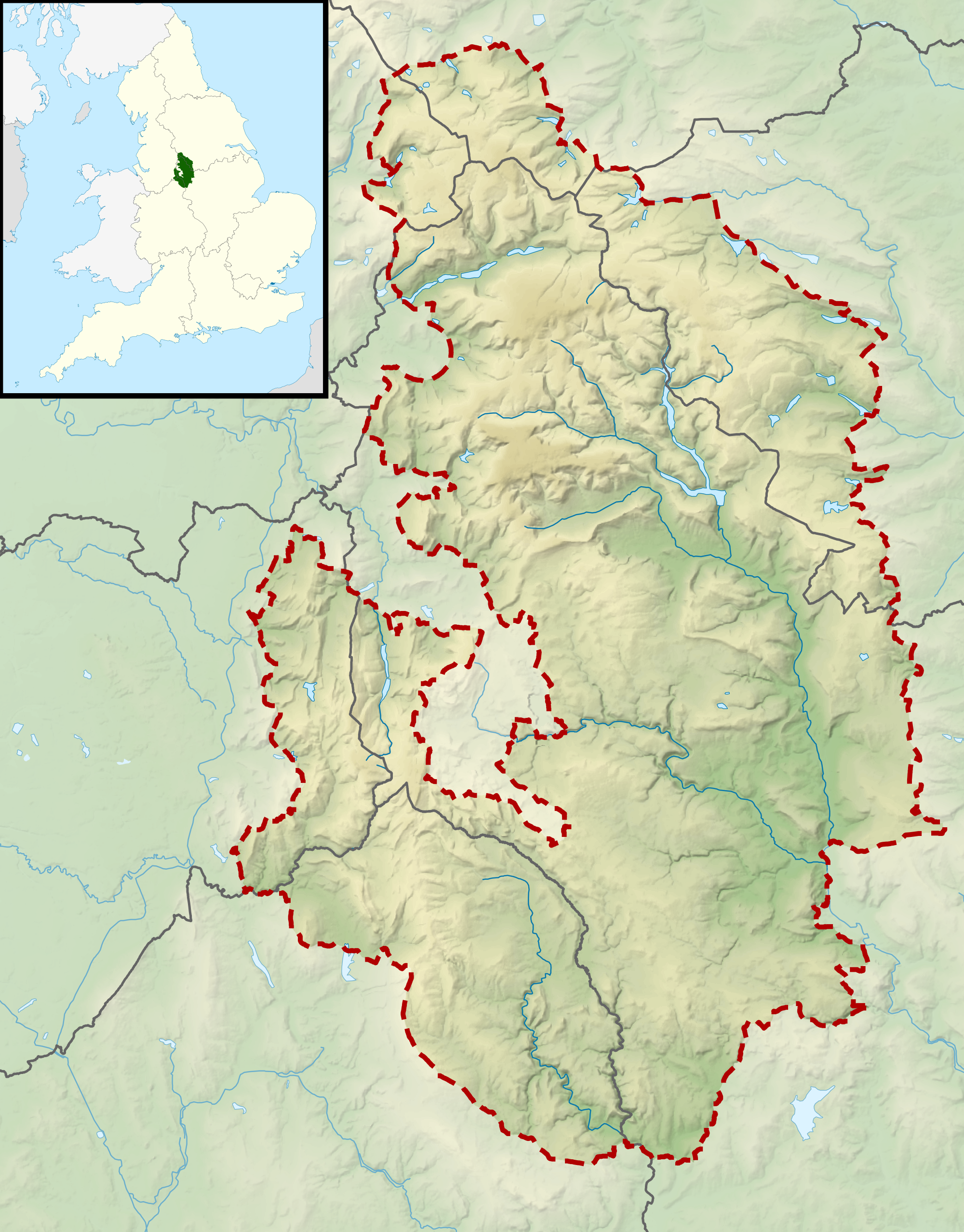
- Location within the Peak District Location within Derbyshire
- Location: Derbyshire, England, UK
- Parent range: Peak District
- OS grid: SK094960
- Topo map: OS Landranger 110

Listed summits of Bleaklow
| Name | Grid ref | Height | Status |
|---|---|---|---|
| Higher Shelf Stones | SK089948 | 621 m | Nuttall |
| Bleaklow Stones | SK116964 | 628 m | |

Bleaklow is a high, largely peat-covered, gritstone moorland in the Derbyshire High Peak near the town of Glossop. It is north of Kinder Scout, across the Snake Pass (A57), and south of the A628 Woodhead Pass. Much of it is nearly 2,000 feet (610 m) above sea level and the shallow bowl of Swains Greave on its eastern side is the source of the River Derwent.

Bleaklow Head (633 m), marked by a large cairn of stones, the high point at the western side of the moor, is a Hewitt and is crossed by the Pennine Way. It is one of three summits on this plateau above 2,000 feet, the others being Bleaklow Stones, some 1.9 miles (3.1 km) to the east along an indefinite ridge, and Higher Shelf Stones, 0.9 miles (1.4 km) south of Bleaklow Head. At 633 metres (2,077 feet), Bleaklow is the second-highest point in Derbyshire and the area includes the most easterly point in the British Isles over 2,000 feet, near Bleaklow Stones.

== Description ==
Much of the main plateau of Bleaklow is a boggy peat moorland, seamed by 'groughs' (pronounced 'gruffs', water-eroded channels in the peat) and lacking strong changes in elevation – in poor conditions its traverse is probably the most navigationally challenging in the Peak District.

== Conservation ==
Bleaklow is part of the National Trust's High Peak Estate. There has been considerable investment of resources in recent years to block many of the eroded peat gulleys as part of major schemes to re-wet and restore healthy Sphagnum moss communities which are essential for peat formation, carbon capture, and reduction in dissolved carbon which contaminates water supplies. Much of this work has been coordinated by the Moors for the Future Partnership, funded by EU LIFE+ programme between 2010 and 2015. This involved laying 52 kilometres (32 mi) of geotextiles to stabilise eroded peat, creating 4,000 mini-dams to retain water, introducing 150,000 moorland plants and spreading 807 million Sphagnum fragments across the whole Bleaklow Project site.

== Views ==
The summit affords views across Manchester, Lancashire and Cheshire to the west and towards the Hope Valley, Holme Moss, Emley Moor and Yorkshire to the east. In exceptional weather conditions it is possible to see Snowdonia in North Wales.

== Aircraft crash ==
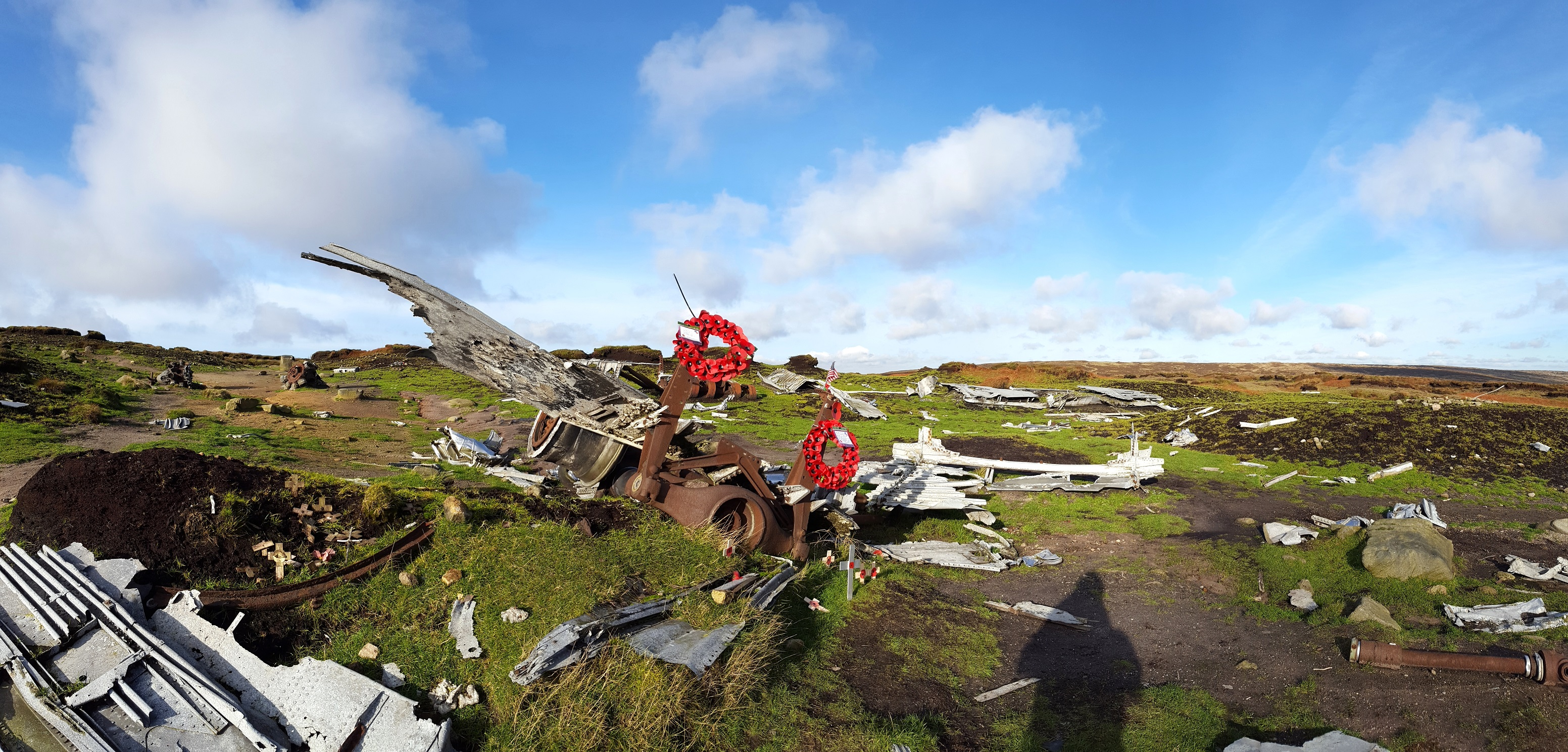
Bleaklow Bomber 1948 Superfortress crash site in 2017

There are a number of aircraft crash sites on Bleaklow. On 3 November 1948, USAF Boeing RB-29A Superfortress 44–61999, of the 16th Photographic Reconnaissance Squadron, 91st Reconnaissance Group, 311th Air Division, Strategic Air Command, crashed at Higher Shelf Stones, Bleaklow (53°27′2.12″N 1°51′54.03″W), en route from Scampton to Burtonwood. All 13 crew members were killed. A large amount of wreckage of the Bleaklow Bomber is still visible. A memorial was erected at the site in 1988. There is public access to the area.

== Gallery ==
| Engine wreckage on Shelfstones | General view of the aircraft wreckage | Memorial plaque by the wreckage | Trig point on Shelf Stones | Descending eroded peat gully on east flank of Bleaklow |
