= Bleaklow Bomber =

Aircraft crash in the Peak District

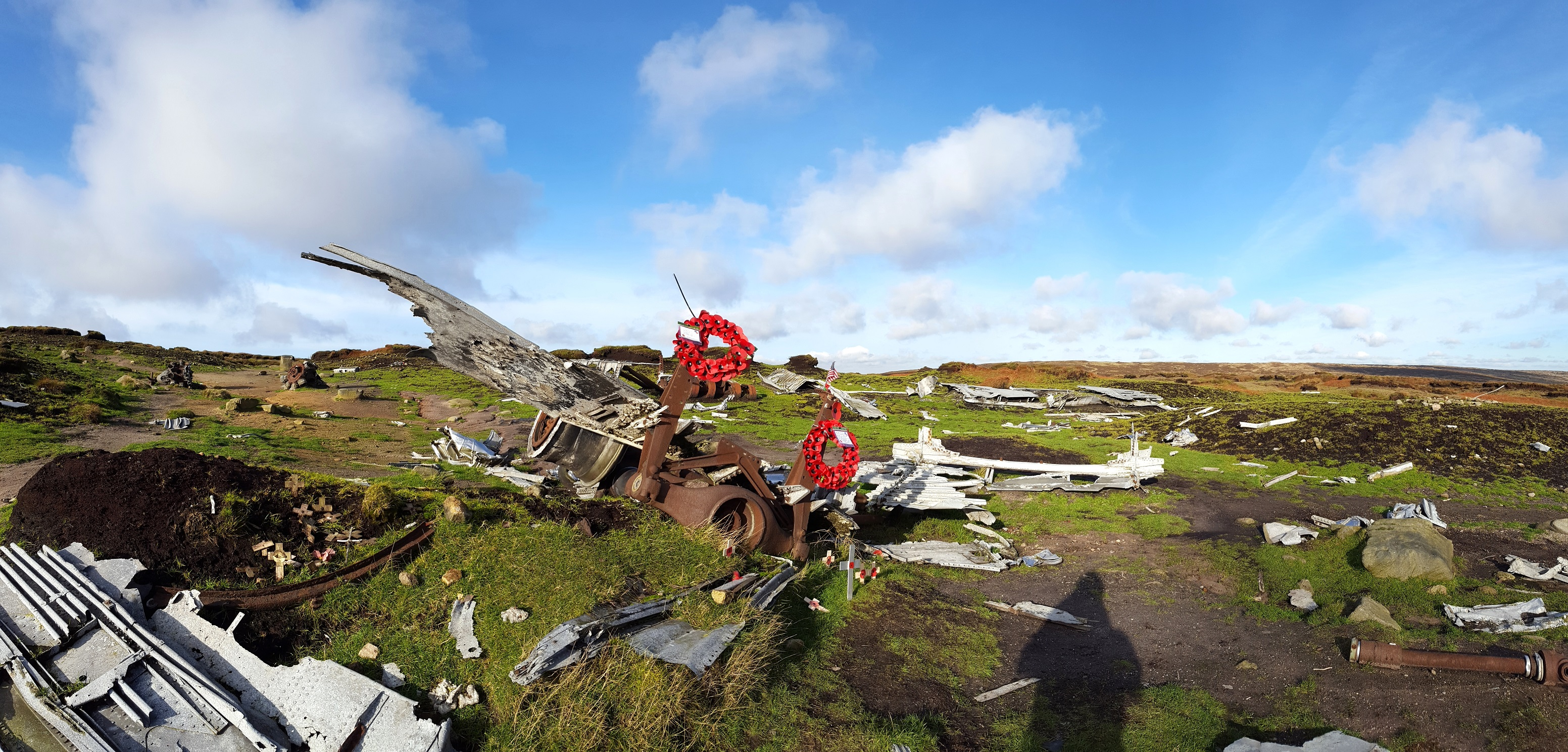
- Wreckage at crash site in 2017

Crash
- Date: 3 November 1948
- Summary: Descent too early in low cloud
- Site: Higher Shelf Stones near Glossop; 53.4505°N 1.8651°W
- Total fatalities: 13

Aircraft
- Aircraft type: Boeing RB-29A Superfortress
- Aircraft name: Over Exposed
- Operator: United States Air Force
- Registration: 44-61999
- Flight origin: Scampton near Lincoln
- Destination: Burtonwood near Warrington
- Passengers: 2
- Crew: 11
- Fatalities: 13
- Survivors: 0

The Bleaklow Bomber was a US Air Force (USAF) Boeing RB-29A Superfortress that crashed near Higher Shelf Stones on Bleaklow in the Peak District in 1948. It was modified as a reconnaissance aircraft, rather than a bomber.

== Superfortress Over Exposed ==
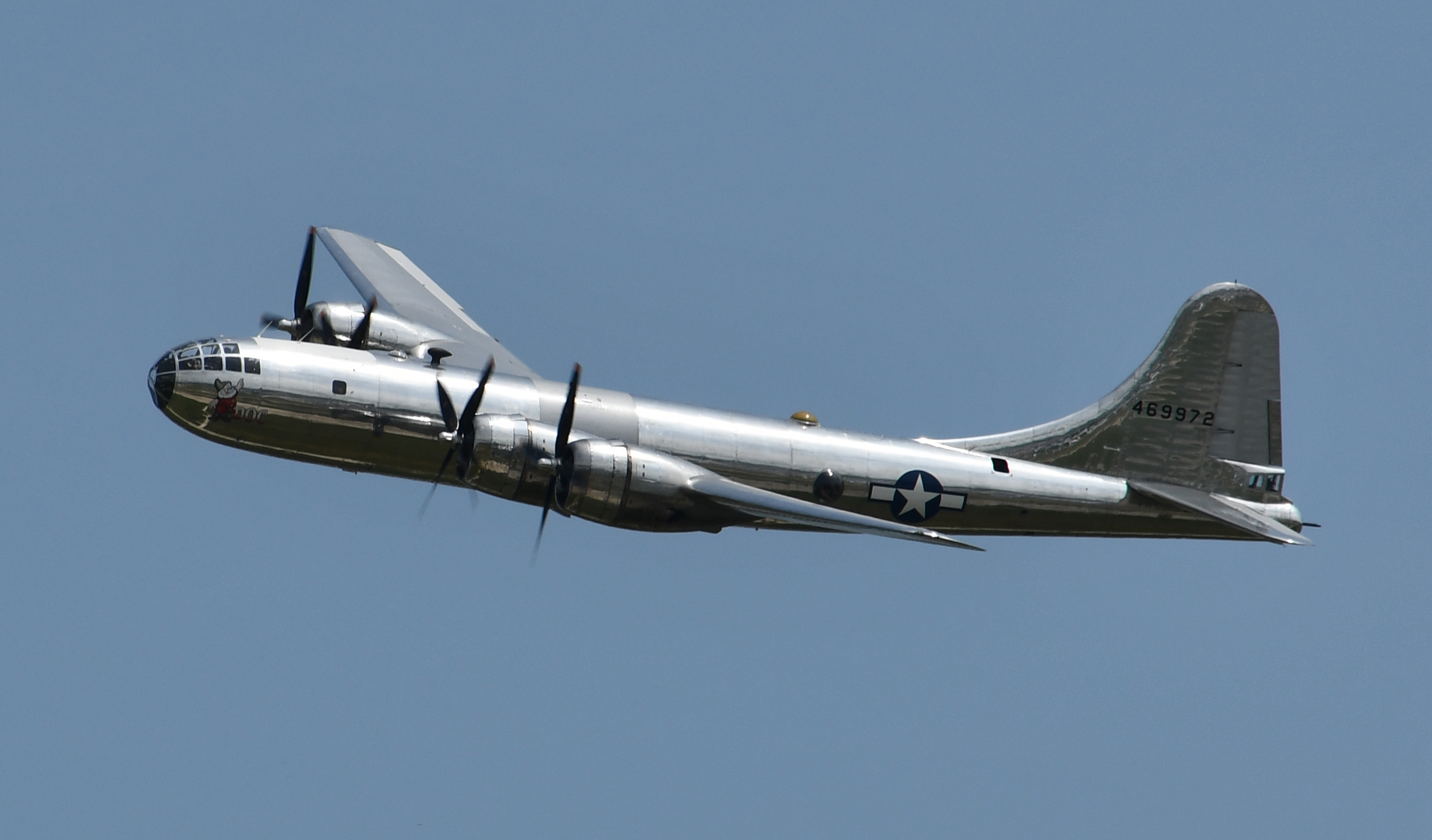
B-29 Superfortress

Boeing 'RB-29A 44-61999 was part of the 16th Photographic Reconnaissance Squadron, 91st Reconnaissance Group, 311th Air Division in the Strategic Air Command of USAF. The aircraft bore the name Over Exposed after it was flown in July 1946 by the 509th Composite Group during Operation Crossroads to photograph nuclear testing at Bikini Atoll, including the dropping of an atomic bomb by B-29 Superfortress Dave's Dream. The aircraft had also taken part in the Berlin airlift during 1948.

== Mission and crash incident ==
The aircraft crashed at Higher Shelf Stones on the Bleaklow moorland plateau near Glossop in Derbyshire on 3 November 1948. The aircraft was on a routine daytime flight with two other aircraft, leaving RAF Scampton near Lincoln at about 10:15 and heading to the US Air Force base at Burtonwood near Warrington. The pilot Captain Landon Tanner and co-pilot Captain Harry Stroud were flying by instruments as the area was covered in low cloud. Based on the flight time, the crew believed it had passed the hills and began to descend. At about 11:00 the aircraft hit the ground at 610m above sea level, 300m north east of the summit of Higher Shelf Stones, and it was engulfed in flames. All 11 crew and 2 military passengers perished in the crash. When the aircraft failed to arrive at the Burtonwood airbase, the nearby RAF Mountain Rescue Service was called to search for the missing aircraft. Already on a training exercise upon the Kinder Scout moors, the RAF Harpur Hill rescue team headed to Bleaklow and located the crash site at about 16:30, by which time the light was fading. The debris of the aircraft was scattered with only the tail section intact. The recovery of the occupants took place the following morning and their bodies were taken to Burtonwood. The aircraft was carrying the $7,400 wages for the Burtonwood airbase. The money survived the fire and was recovered at the crash site by the American Military Police.

== Crew ==
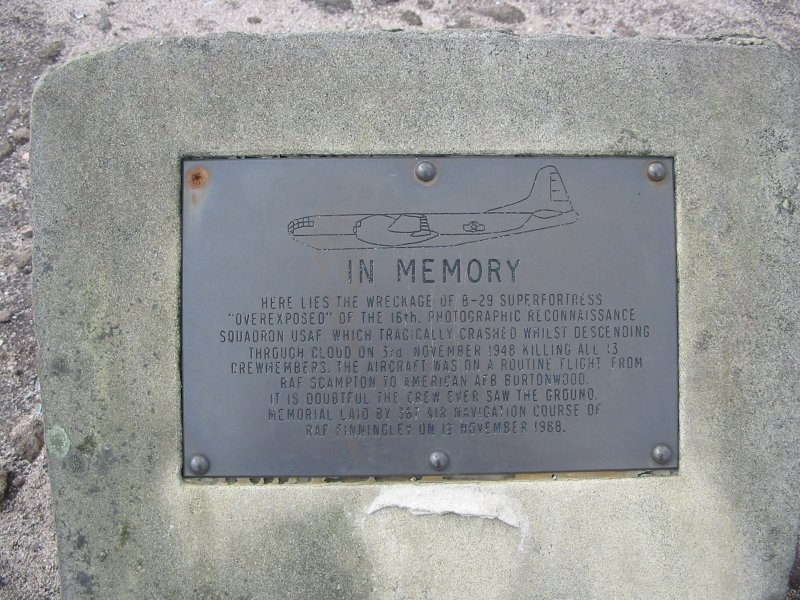
Memorial to the aircraft's crew

- Captain Landon P. Tanner (pilot)
- Captain Harry A. Stroud (co-pilot)
- Sergeant Ralph W. Fields (engineer)
- Sergeant Charles R. Wilbanks (navigator)
- Sergeant Gene A. Gartner (radio operator)
- Sergeant David D. Moore (radar operator)
- Sergeant Saul R. Banks (camera crew)
- Sergeant Donald R. Abrogast (camera crew)
- Sergeant Robert I. Doyle (camera crew)
- Private William M. Burrows (camera crew)
- Corporal Clarence M. Franssen (passenger)
- Corporal George Ingram Jr (passenger)
- Captain Howard E. Keel (photographic advisor)

== Crash site ==
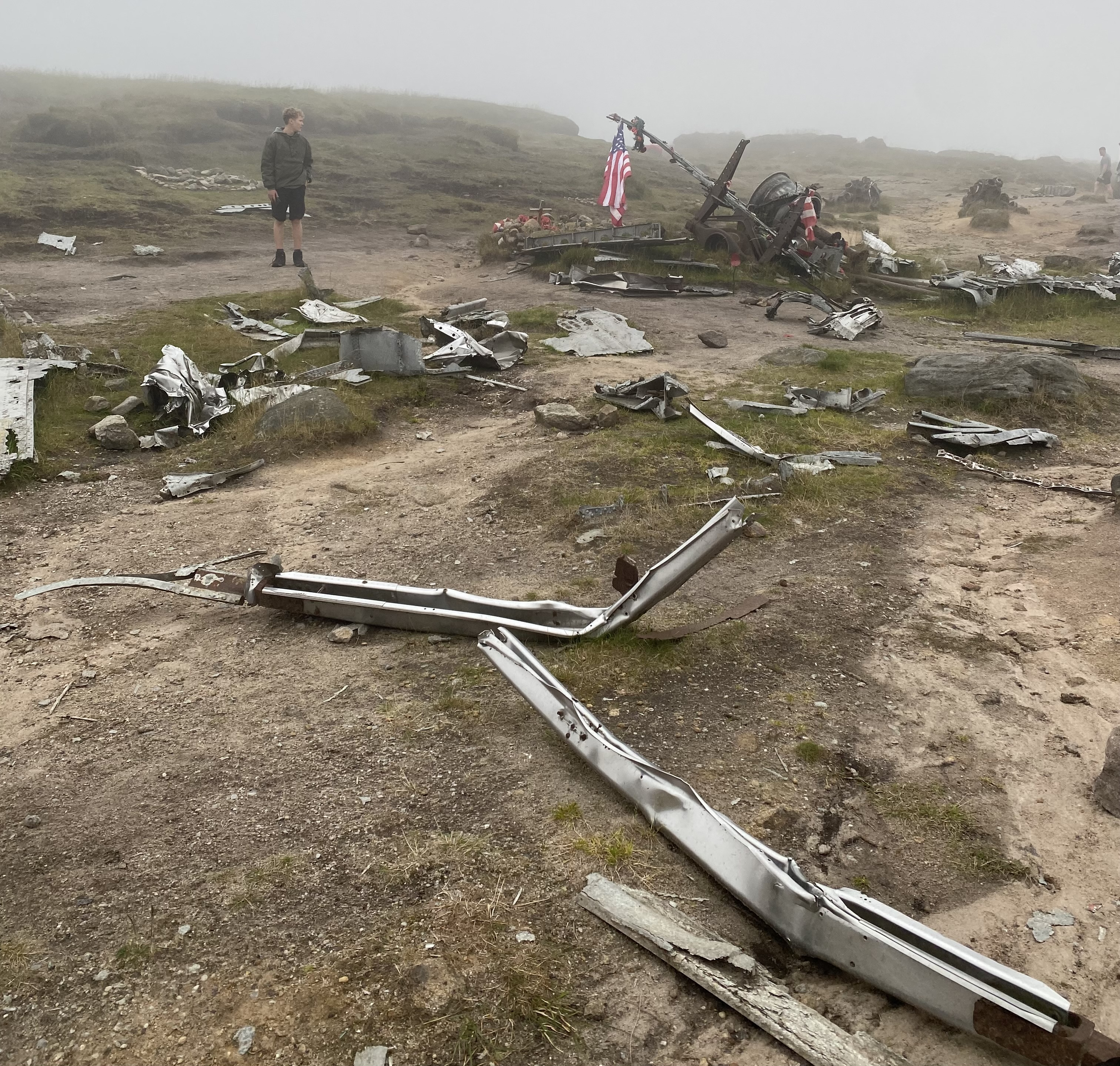
The centre of the crash site on Bleaklow

In 1988, a memorial was erected at the site by servicemen from RAF Finningley, with a plaque in memory of those who died in the crash.

Much of the wreckage is still exposed, including the Duplex-Cyclone engines, wing sections, fuselage sections, undercarriage and gun turrets. One of the gun turrets is on display at the air museum in Newark-on-Trent, Nottinghamshire. In the 1970s a local man found a ring at the crash site, which was identified as Captain Tanner's wedding ring and was returned to his daughter.

The area around the crash site is challenging to navigate. The most obvious route is from the trig pillar at the summit of Higher Shelf Stones. It is about a 2-mile (3.2 km) walk to the crash site from the lay-by at the summit of Snake Pass, starting along the Pennine Way footpath through Devil's Dyke. During the COVID-19 pandemic in the United Kingdom in 2020, local Mountain Rescue teams issued warnings that inexperienced hikers should exercise caution before attempting a winter visit.

B-29 Over Exposed crash site in 2024

== Other Bleaklow air crashes ==
Several other military aircraft have crashed on the Bleaklow moors.

Date	Aircraft	Crew	Location	Incident
30 January 1939	Bristol Blenheim Mk.I L1476 No.64 Squadron RAF	Pilot Stanley John Daly Robinson (Killed) Passenger Jack Elliott Thomas (Killed)	Sykes Moor, Bleaklow	During a training flight from RAF Church Fenton near Tadcaster, the plane nose-dived into the ground killing both of the crew. The wreck was discovered two weeks later by a local walker. A memorial was erected at the crash site in 1991.
29 August 1941	Boulton Paul Defiant Mk.I N3378 No.255 Squadron RAF	Pilot James Craig (Killed) Passenger George Daniel Hempstead (Killed)	Bleaklow Stones, Bleaklow	Crashed at cruising speed in low cloud over the Pennines while returning to RAF Hibaldstow in Lincolnshire from RAF Turnhouse at Edinburgh. The aircraft had flown inland from its planned route along the east coast in order to avoid thunderstorms. A search by ten aircraft failed to locate the crashed plane. On 23 September 1941 the crash site was discovered by two shepherds.
10 December 1941	Blackburn Botha Mk.I W5103 No.7 Ferry Pilots Pool RAF	Pilot Thomas William Rogers (Killed)	Round Hill, Bleaklow	The aircraft was destroyed on impact while flying from Blackburn Aircraft’s factory at Sherburn-in-Elmet near Leeds to Harwarden near Chester. The pilot had descended through low cloud before he had cleared the hills.
30 January 1943	Vickers Wellington Mk.IC R1011 No.28 Operational Training Unit RAF	Pilot Anthony Winter Lane (Killed) Bomb Aimer Charles Douglas Brown (Killed) Navigator Charles Leslie Grisdale (Injured) Air Gunner Raymond Gerard Rouse (Killed) Wireless Operator Miller (Injured)	Birchen Bank Moss, Bleaklow	The aircraft crashed onto the moor while flying at night in low cloud and wintry weather. Two of seven planes from the Operational Training Unit at RAF Wymeswold and RAF Castle Donington were lost during a Bullseye exercise (simulated night bombing). Wellington R1538 also crashed, near Stoke-on-Trent.
18 May 1945	Avro Lancaster Mk.X KB993 No.408 Squadron RAF	Pilot Anthony Arthur Clifford (Killed) Flight Engineer Kenneth McIvor (Killed) Bomb Aimer David Fehrman (Killed) Wireless Operator Michael Cecil Cameron (Killed) Air Gunner Clarence Halvorson (Killed) Air Gunner Leslie Claude Hellekson (Killed)	James Thorn, Bleaklow	The aircraft was flying from RAF Linton-on-Ouse near York and struck the hillside after dark. The crew had become disorientated without a qualified navigator on board, because the crew should only have been carrying out circuits around the airfield but had decided to fly cross-country.
24 July 1945	Douglas C-47A Dakota 42-108982 314th Troop Carrier Group USAAF	Pilot George L. Johnson (Killed) Co-pilot Earl W. Burns (Killed) Navigator Beverly W. Izlar (Killed) Crew Chief Theodore R. McCrocklin (Killed) Radio Operator Francis M. Maloney (Killed) Passenger Grover R. Alexander (Killed) Leading Aircraftman John Dunlop Main, RAF (Killed)	Shelf Moor, Bleaklow	The aircraft crashed on Shelf Moor in low cloud on a transport flight from RAF Leicester East to RAF Renfrew. It had started its journey from Poix, near Amiens in France. The wreckage was discovered two days later by an off-duty RAF man walking on Bleaklow.
5 December 1956	De Havilland Canada L-20A Beaver 52-6145 81st Fighter Bomber Wing USAF	Pilot John Rossman Tinklepaugh (Killed) Passenger Guy Waller (Killed)	Bramah Edge, Bleaklow	The aircraft crashed onto the moor during a flight from RAF Sculthorpe near Fakenham in Norfolk. The aircraft was wrongly identified by an air traffic controller at RAF Burtonwood who mistakenly directed the plane into the hillside. Lieutenant Waller was also a pilot and was being taken to Burtonwood to collect a Republic F-84 Thunderjet and fly it back to Sculthorpe.
