= Recreational walks in Derbyshire =

List of walking trails in Derbyshire, England

This is a partial list of recreational walks in the county of Derbyshire in England. The list includes walks that are wholly inside Derbyshire and also those that pass through to other counties. The walks are generally through countryside on a variety of trails and footpaths. Small walks of only local interest are not included. There are over 3,000 miles (4,800 km) of public rights of way in Derbyshire.

== List of walking trails in Derbyshire ==
Name	Image	Route	Length	Notes	Refs
Dane Valley Way		Buxton to Northwich, Cheshire	48 miles (77km)	Between Derbyshire and Cheshire, partly alongside the River Dane. The Derbyshire section runs from Buxton to Three Shires Head	
Derwent Valley Heritage Way		Ladybower Reservoir, Bamford, to River Trent at Shardlow	55 miles (89 km)	Alongside the River Derwent, through the Derwent Valley Mills World Heritage Site and Derby	
Five Pits Trail		Grassmoor to Tibshelf	5.5 miles (8.9 km)	Former railway line	
Goyt Way		Whaley Bridge to Etherow Country Park, Greater Manchester	10 miles (16 km)	Part of the Midshires Way	
High Peak Trail		Buxton to Cromford	17 miles (27 km)	Former railway line	
Limestone Way		Castleton to Rocester, Staffordshire	50 miles (80 km)	The Derbyshire section goes between Castleton and the River Dove near Thorpe	
Longdendale Trail		Hadfield to Woodhead Tunnel	6.2 miles (10 km)	Former railway line	
Midshires Way		Bledlow, Buckinghamshire, to Stockport, Greater Manchester	230 miles (370 km)	The Derbyshire section starts at Sawley near Long Eaton, on to Buxton and through the Goyt Valley towards Stockport.	
Monsal Trail		Wye Dale, Buxton, to Coombs viaduct, Bakewell	8.5 miles (13.7 km)	Former railway line	
Peak District Boundary Walk		Buxton circular	190 miles (310 km)	The Derbyshire sections are between: Whaley Bridge and Buxton; Buxton and Tintwistle (near Glossop); Owler Bar (near Grindleford) and Thorpe (near Ashbourne)	
Pennine Bridleway (National Trail)		Middleton-by-Wirksworth to Hebden Bridge	130 miles (210 km)	The Derbyshire section is between Middleton-by-Wirksworth and Tintwistle (near Glossop)	
Pennine Cycleway (Sustrans-sponsored route)		Derby to Berwick-upon-Tweed	335 miles (539 km)	The Derbyshire section runs from Derby up to along the Woodhead Pass valley towards Holmfirth	
Pennine Way (National Trail)		Edale to Kirk Yetholm	268 miles (431 km)	The Derbyshire section is from Edale to Black Hill	
Sabrina Way		Hartington to Great Barrington, Gloucestershire	203 miles (327 km)	The short Derbyshire section is between Hartington and the River Dove (towards Alstonefield)	
Sett Valley Trail		Hayfield to New Mills	2.2 miles (3.6 km)	Former railway line	
Tissington Trail		Buxton to Parsley Hay	13 miles (21 km)	Former railway line	
Trans Pennine Trail		Southport to Hornsea	207 miles (333 km)	From Merseyside to East Yorkshire. The Derbyshire section runs from the border with Greater Manchester at Broadbottom Bridge to the edge of Barnsley Metropolitan District east of Woodhead; from Padfield it coincides with the Longdendale Trail, above. A spur runs from Chesterfield past Killamarsh (towards Sheffield).	
White Peak Loop Trail		Circular via Buxton, Bakewell and Matlock	60 miles (97 km)	The trail combines sections of the High Peak Trail and the Monsal Trail. As of 2020 some sections are not yet complete.	

== See also ==
- Long-distance footpaths in the UK
- List of parks and open spaces in Derbyshire
- Recreational trails in the Peak District
