= Recreational trails in the Peak District =

This is a partial list of long distance footpaths and multi-use trails in the Peak District of England. The list includes trails that are wholly inside the Peak District and also those that pass through it. The walks are generally through countryside on a variety of footpaths, lanes and bridle paths. Short walks of only local interest are not included.

== List of recreational trails in the Peak District ==
Name	Image	Route	Length	Notes	Refs
Churnet Way		Winking Man pub at Upper Hulme to Rocester	32 miles (51 km)	Footpath down the Churnet Valley in Staffordshire. The short Peak District section is across Ramshaw Rocks to Tittesworth Reservoir.	
Cown Edge Way		Hazel Grove to Gee Cross	16.7 miles (26.9 km)	The short Peak District section is along Cown Edge Rocks and Coombes Edge near Charlesworth	
Dane Valley Way		Buxton to Northwich, Cheshire	48 miles (77km)	Between Derbyshire and Cheshire, partly alongside the River Dane. The Peak District section is between Buxton and Bosley Cloud.	
Derwent Valley Heritage Way		Ladybower Reservoir, Bamford, to River Trent at Shardlow	55 miles (89 km)	Alongside the River Derwent, through the Derwent Valley Mills World Heritage Site and Derby. The Peak District section is between Ladybower Reservoir and Cromford.	
Goyt Way		Whaley Bridge to Etherow Country Park, Greater Manchester	10 miles (16 km)	Part of the Midshires Way	
Gritstone Trail		Kidsgrove to Disley	35 miles (56 km)	The Peak District section is between The Cloud and Lyme Park	
Hamps Way		Mermaid Inn at Morridge and Weag's Bridge, Staffordshire	14 miles (23 km)	Footpath following the River Hamps	
High Peak Trail		Buxton to Cromford	17 miles (27 km)	Bridle path along a former railway line	
Kirklees Way		Huddersfield circular	71 miles (115 km)	The Peak District section is between Hepworth and Marsden, West Yorkshire	
Limestone Way		Castleton to Rocester, Staffordshire	50 miles (80 km)	The Peak District section is between Castleton and the River Dove near Thorpe.	
Longdendale Trail		Hadfield to Woodhead Tunnel	6.2 miles (10 km)	Bridle path along a former railway line	
Manifold Trail		Flash, Derbyshire to Ilam, Staffordshire	23 miles (37 km)	Footpath following the River Manifold from its source down the Manifold Valley.	
Manifold Way		Hulme End to Waterhouses	8.1 miles (13 km)	Bridle path in the Manifold Valley along a former light railway line	
Midshires Way		Bledlow, Buckinghamshire to Stockport, Greater Manchester	230 miles (370 km)	The Peak District section is between Cromford and New Mills.	
Monsal Trail		Wye Dale, Buxton, to Coombs viaduct, Bakewell	8.5 miles (13.7 km)	Bridle path along a former railway line	
Oldham Way		Oldham circular	39 miles (62 km)	The Peak District sections is between Greenfield Valley and Diggle	
Peak District Boundary Walk		Buxton circular	190 miles (310 km)	Waymarked route (in 20 stages) established by the Friends of the Peak District in 2017	
Pennine Bridleway (National Trail)		Middleton-by-Wirksworth to Hebden Bridge	130 miles (210 km)	The Peak District section is between Middleton-by-Wirksworth and Tintwistle (near Glossop)	
Pennine Cycleway - Peak District		Derby to Holmfirth	77 miles (124 km)	The Peak District section of this Sustrans cycling route (ending at Berwick-upon-Tweed) runs pastAshbourne, Buxton and New Mills.	
Pennine Way (National Trail)		Edale to Kirk Yetholm	268 miles (431 km)	The Peak District section is from Edale to Standedge	
Sabrina Way		Hartington to Great Barrington, Gloucestershire	203 miles (327 km)	The Peak District section of this horse riding route is between Hartington and Waterhouses	
Sett Valley Trail		Hayfield to New Mills	2.2 miles (3.6 km)	Bridle path along a former railway line	
Sheffield Country Walk		Sheffield circular	53 miles (85 km)	The Peak District section is between Totley and Damflask Reservoir	
Standedge Trail		Pennines circular near Marsden, West Yorkshire	12 miles (19 km)	Circular walk that links both ends of Standedge Tunnel	
Tissington Trail		Buxton to Parsley Hay	13 miles (21 km)	Bridle path along a former railway line	
Trans Pennine Trail		Southport, Merseyside to Hornsea, East Yorkshire	207 miles (333 km)	The Peak District section is between Hadfield and Penistone	
White Peak Loop Trail		Circular via Buxton, Bakewell and Matlock	60 miles (97 km)	The trail combines sections of the High Peak Trail and the Monsal Trail. As of 2025 some sections are not yet complete.	

== See also ==
- Long-distance footpaths in the UK
