= Hague Bar =

Hamlet in Derbyshire, England

Coordinates: 53.368°N 2.024°W

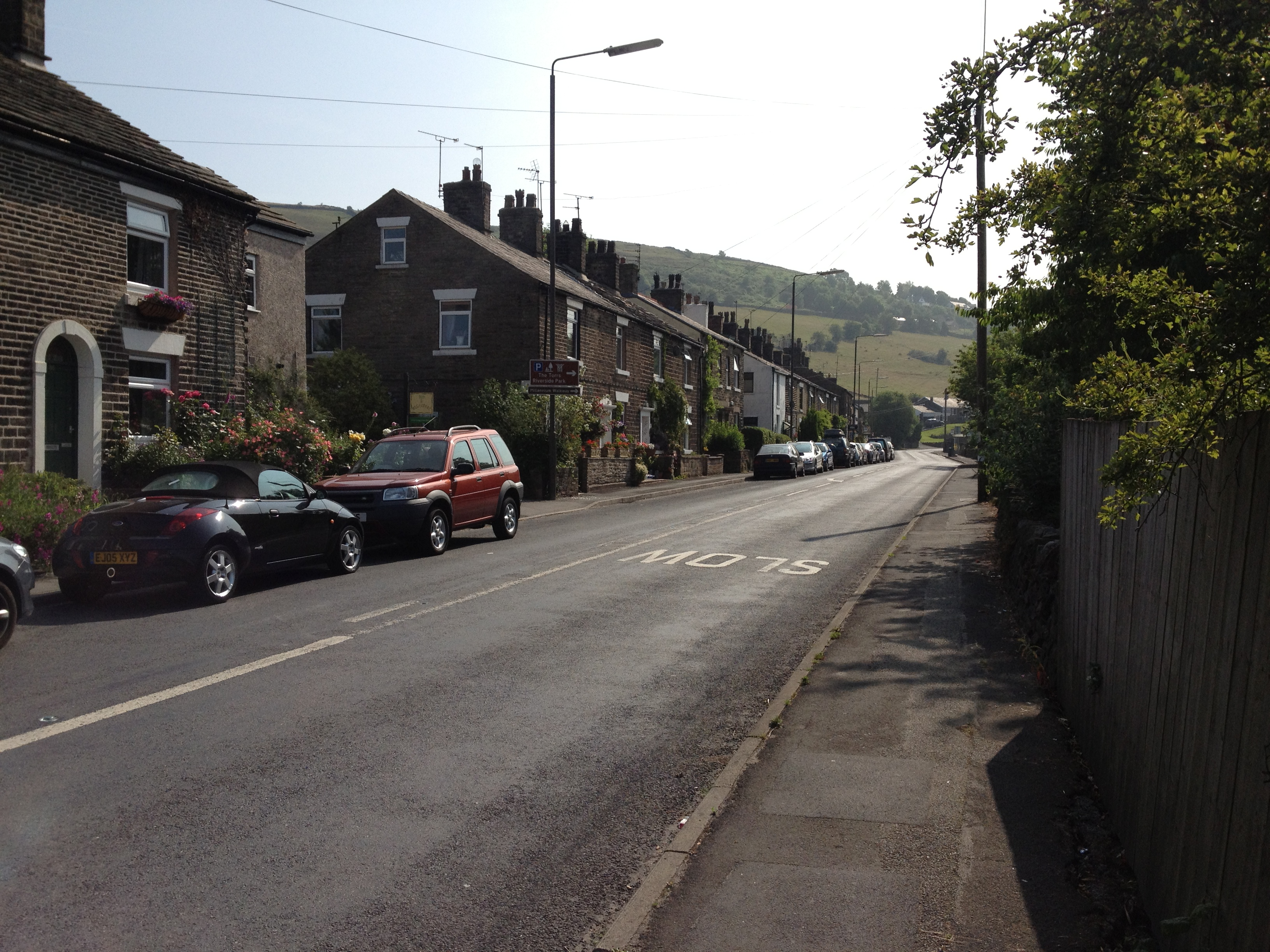
- Hague Bar, B6101 road

- Location within Derbyshire
- OS grid reference: SJ985857
- Civil parish: New Mills
- District: High Peak
- Shire county: Derbyshire
- Region: East Midlands
- Country: England
- Sovereign state: United Kingdom
- Post town: HIGH PEAK
- Postcode district: SK22
- Dialling code: 01663
- Police: Derbyshire
- Fire: Derbyshire
- Ambulance: East Midlands
- UK Parliament: High Peak

Hague Bar is a hamlet in New Mills, Derbyshire, near Marple and Stockport. The Manchester to Sheffield railway passes through the Goyt valley at this point. Its population is included in the figures shown for New Mills. Hague Bar is the most westerly settlement in Derbyshire. The Goyt Way, part of the Midshires Way and the E2 European long-distance path, passes through the village on its 10-mile (16 km) route from Etherow Country Park to Whaley Bridge.

== See also ==
- List of places in Derbyshire
