= New Mills Town Hall =

Municipal building in New Mills, Derbyshire, England

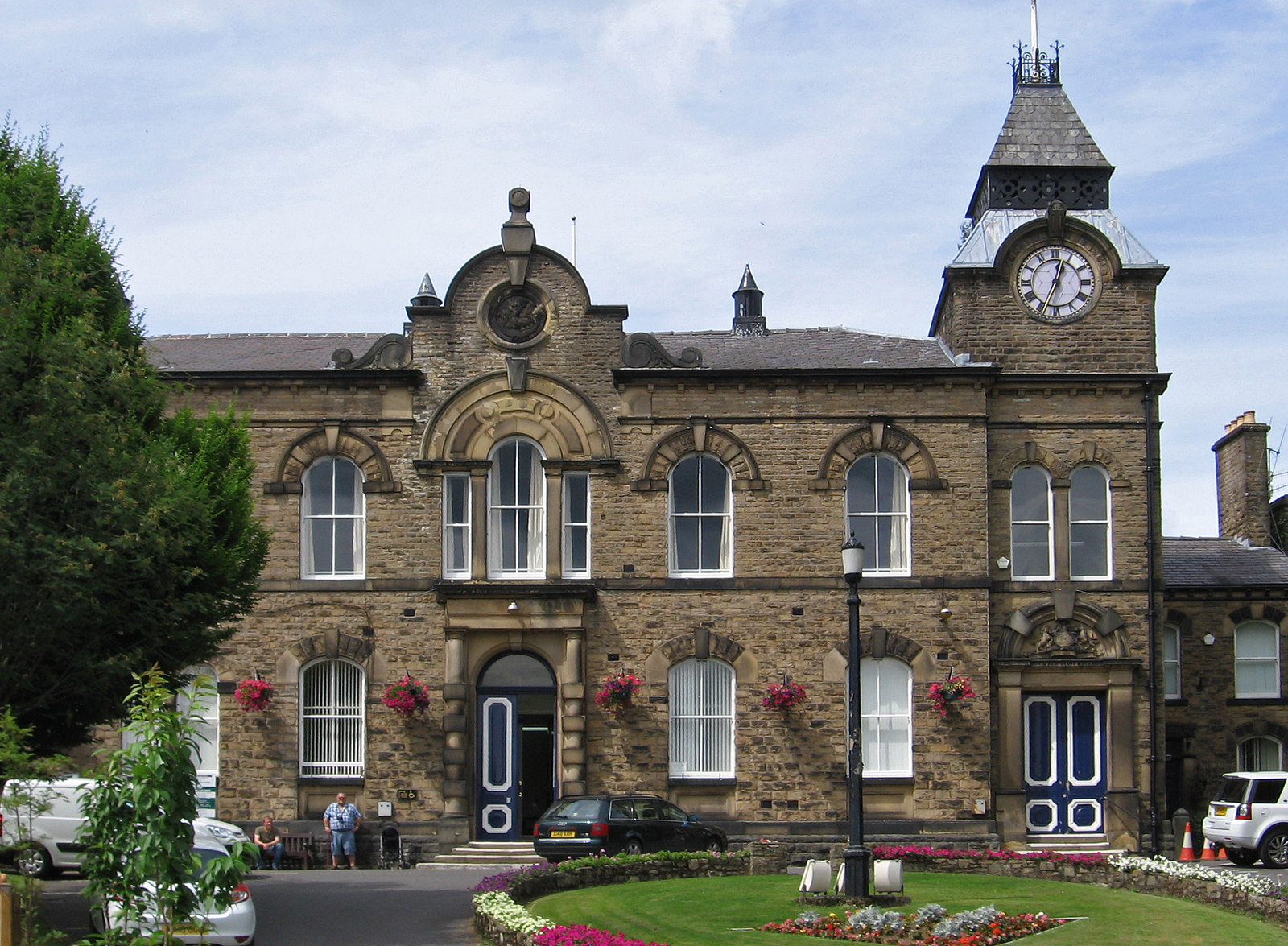
- New Mills Town Hall in 2013

- Location within the Borough of High Peak
- 53.3681°N 2.0018°W
- Location: Spring Bank, New Mills

History
- Built: 1871

Site notes
- Website: New Mills Town Council

New Mills Town Hall is a municipal building on Spring Bank, New Mills, Derbyshire, England. Constructed of local gritstone, it was opened in 1871 as a public hall for the Mechanics Institute, and became a town hall in 1895 upon the creation of New Mills Urban District Council, which used it as administrative headquarters until its 1974 abolition. It is now the seat of New Mills Town Council and a hireable community venue.

== History ==
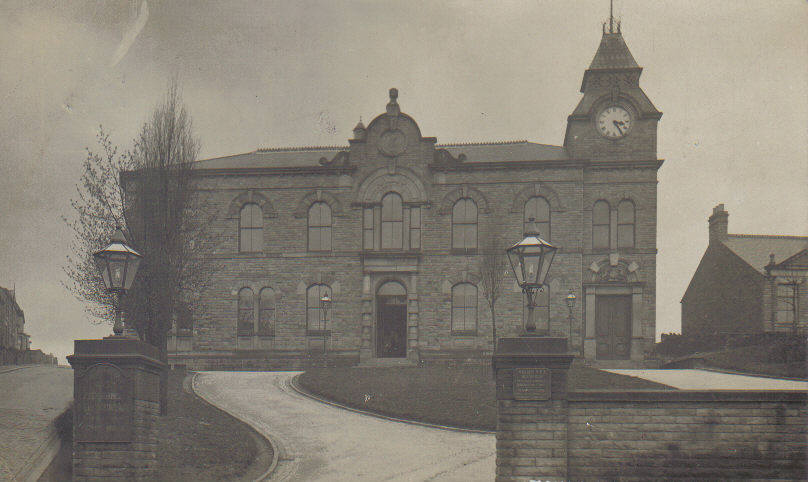
Early photograph of New Mills Town Hall

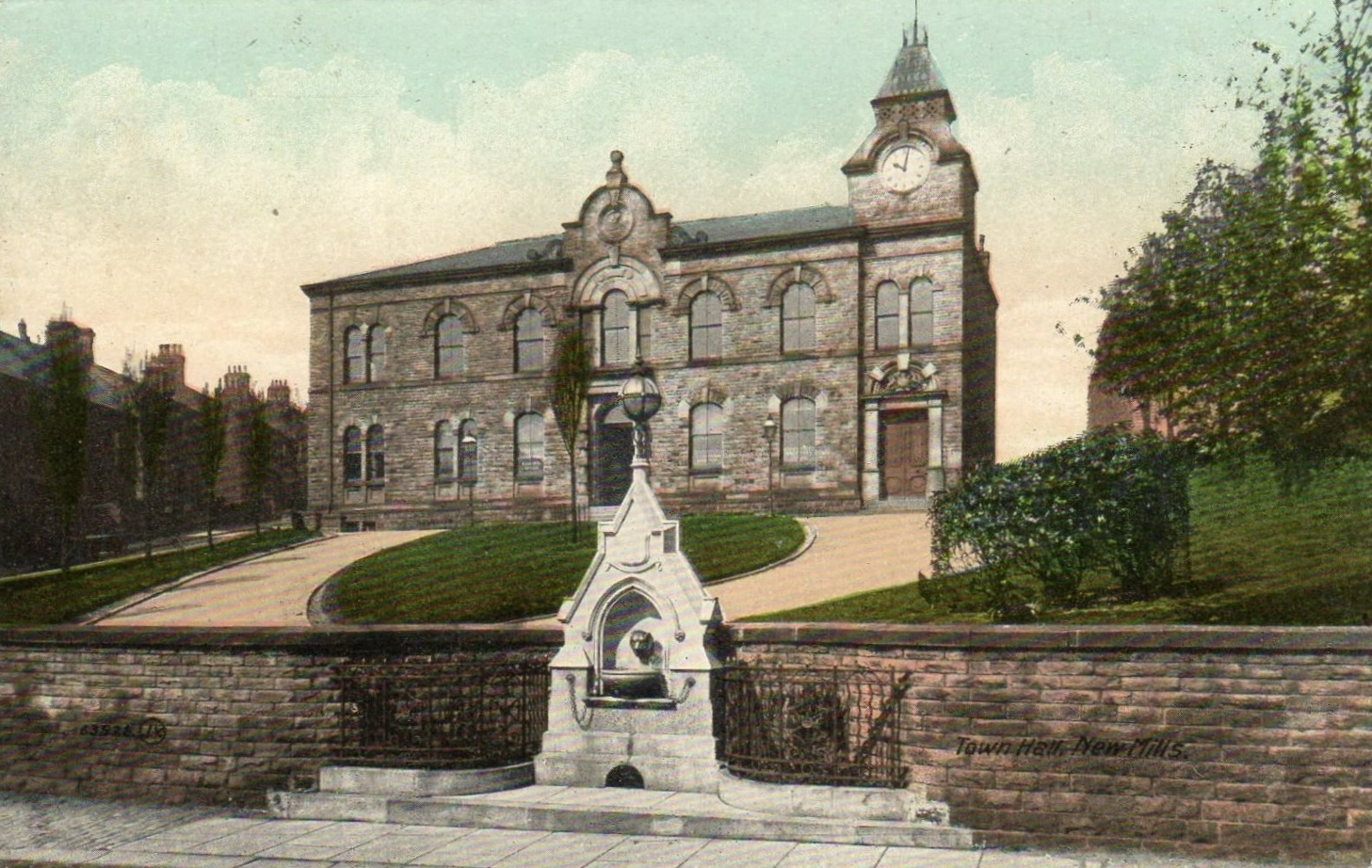
1913 postcard

The middle to late nineteenth century was a period in which several public buildings were built in the town, including banks, halls, schools, and many Co-operative shops. The Mechanics' Institute of New Mills first suggested the building of a public hall in 1859 when it needed more space. It took twelve years to raise the money, entirely by public subscription, to buy the land and begin the building. Its opening ceremony took place on 9 September 1871, with the hall opened by the Duke of Devonshire. It had a multitude of uses, including public and private events, exhibitions, meetings, county courts, Local Board offices, as well as the reading rooms of the Mechanics' Institute. It was extended in 1875 to include a clock tower, and again in 1899 with the construction of a Carnegie free library to its rear (replaced by the larger present one in 1910), making New Mills one of the smallest towns in Derbyshire to operate one. The clock is made by Potts of Leeds; its original chimes were replaced in 1939.

The Town Hall was transferred to the new New Mills Urban District Council in 1895 to be used as its offices. Urban districts were type of local government district which shared local government responsibilities with a county council. This was abolished in 1974 by the Local Government Act 1972, with the functions of New Mills UDC passed to High Peak Borough Council. A new town council was formed which continues to use the Town Hall for its offices and Council Chamber, shared with other public services including the Registrar and Citizens Advice.

Beyond its administrative functions the New Mills Town Hall is used as originally intended, for concerts, public meetings, dances, school fairs and bazaars, exhibitions, weddings and other celebrations. Some of the archives of the heritage centre and local history society are stored here. In 1991, as part of the New Mills 600 celebrations, floodlighting was installed, and in 1994, following extensive roof repairs, the main hall was redecorated and the seating recovered, adding to its attractiveness as a venue. In 1997, accessibility was improved by the construction of a footbridge and disabled parking area. The building has not received a listing from Historic England.
