= Brookbottom =

Hamlet in Derbyshire, England

Coordinates: 53.375°N 2.023°W

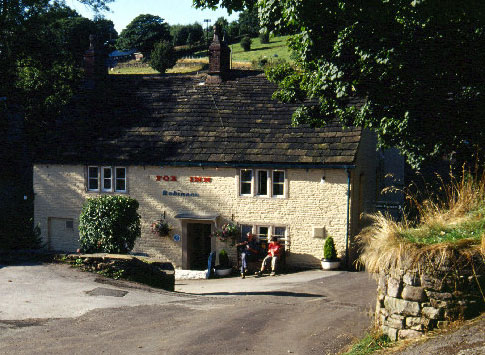
- Brookbottom

- Location within Derbyshire
- OS grid reference: SJ985864
- District: High Peak
- Shire county: Derbyshire
- Region: East Midlands
- Country: England
- Sovereign state: United Kingdom
- Post town: HIGH PEAK
- Postcode district: SK22
- Dialling code: 0161
- Police: Derbyshire
- Fire: Derbyshire
- Ambulance: East Midlands

Brookbottom is a hamlet about a mile outside New Mills in the High Peak borough of Derbyshire, England.

It has one pub, the Fox Inn, one phone box but two street lights. The Goyt Way (part of the Midshires Way) runs through it. The Fox Inn and most of the cottages date from the 17th and 18th centuries and are Grade II listed.
