= Rowarth =

Hamlet in Derbyshire, England

Coordinates: 53.400°N 1.990°W

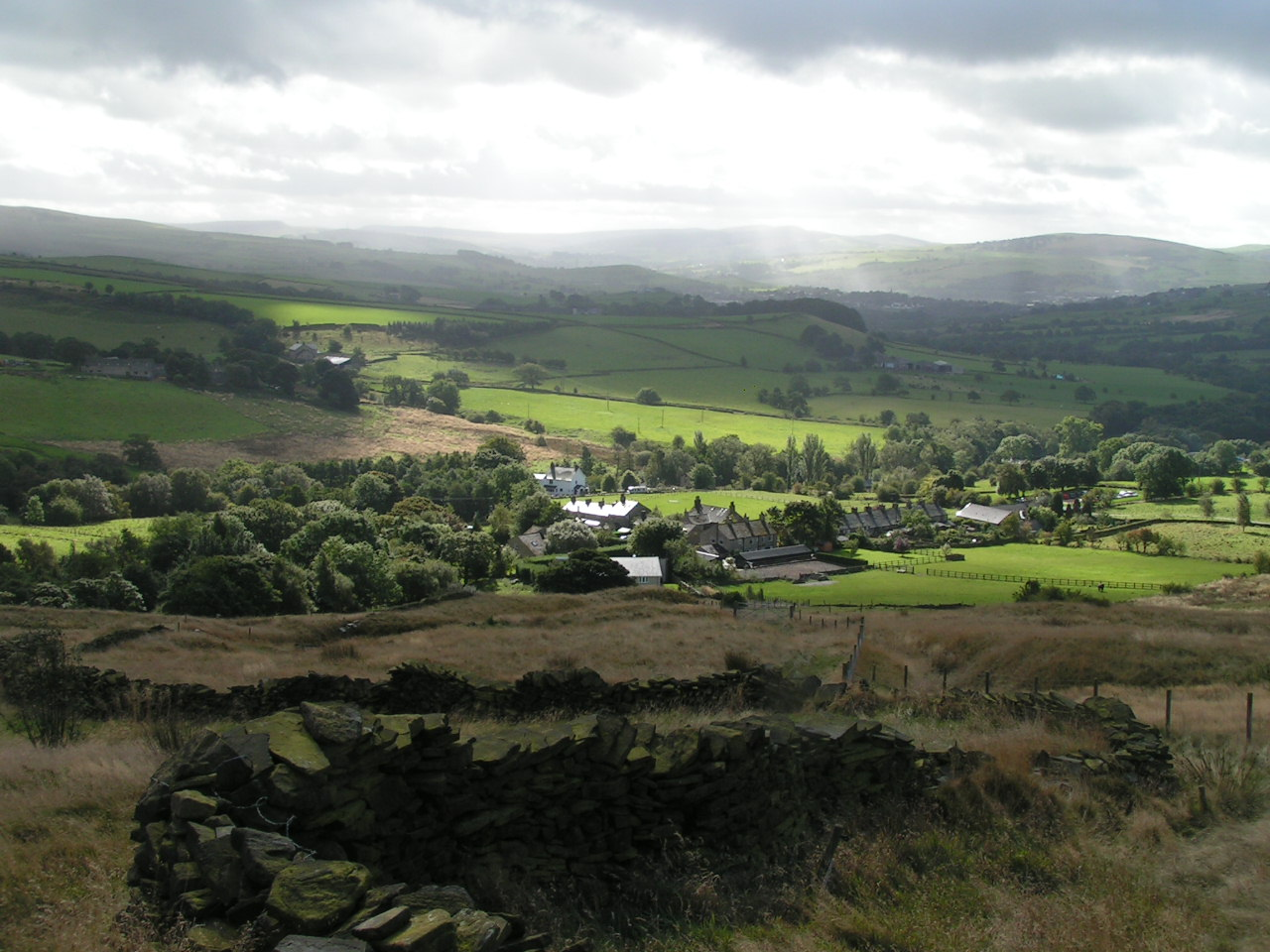
- Rowarth from the north

- Location within Derbyshire
- OS grid reference: SK007892
- District: High Peak
- Shire county: Derbyshire
- Region: East Midlands
- Country: England
- Sovereign state: United Kingdom
- Post town: HIGH PEAK
- Postcode district: SK22
- Dialling code: 01663
- Police: Derbyshire
- Fire: Derbyshire
- Ambulance: East Midlands
- UK Parliament: High Peak

Rowarth is a hamlet about 2.5 miles (4 km) north of New Mills in the High Peak borough of Derbyshire, England. It is on the edge of the Peak District, in the hills between New Mills and Marple Bridge, within the parish boundary of New Mills.

The Little Mill Inn in Rowarth is a pub and restaurant in a former candlewick mill, with a waterwheel in the adjacent stream. Until 2023, it had a retired Brighton Belle Pullman railway coach which was once used as dining and guest accommodation.

== Geography ==
The hamlet is only accessible by car on one road, and is most commonly used by walkers who are going to nearby Lantern Pike and Kinder Scout.

The Peak District Boundary Walk runs through the village.

== Landmarks ==
There are several listed buildings in and around Rowarth, all at Grade II, the lowest level of designation, and a couple of scheduled monuments:

- the Little Mill Inn, housed in a former mill building dated 1781
- Anderton House, dated 1797, and its adjacent barn
- Long Lee Farmhouse, dated 1668, and three associated farm buildings
- Thornsett Fields Farm, a 17th-century farmhouse, and adjacent barn
- an 18th-century barn at Hollins Farm with an earlier doorway dated 1692
- Robin Hood's Picking Rods, a wayside and a boundary cross on the border with the neighbouring parish of Chisworth and a nearby cup-and-ring-marked rock

== Transport ==
There is no public transport to Rowarth. The 385 bus goes to Shilhoh Road, around 1 mile from Rowarth.
