= Calico =

Type of textile

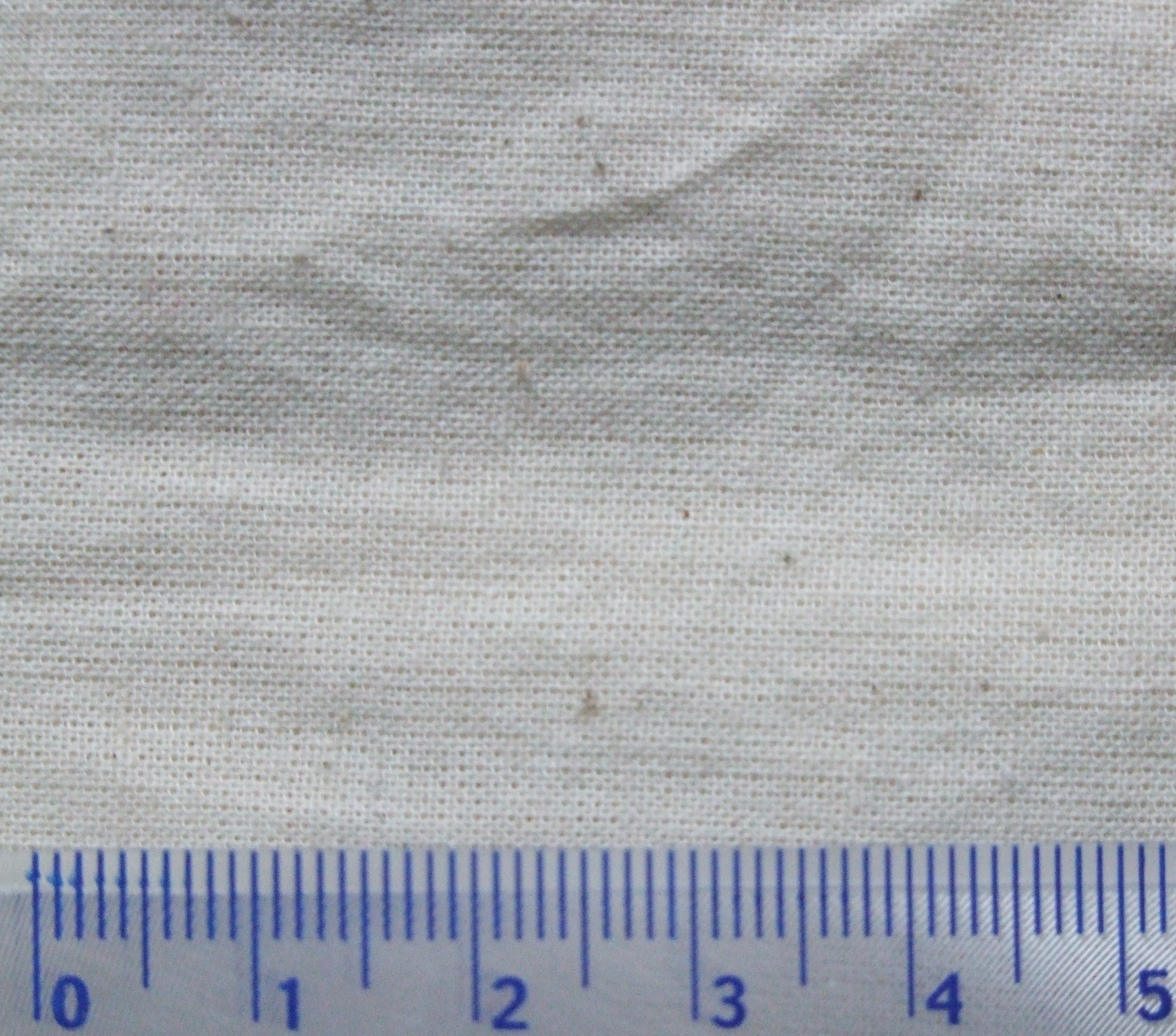
The weave of calico sample from a shopping bag shown against a centimetre scale

Calico (/ˈkælɪkoʊ/; in British usage since 1505) is a heavy plain-woven textile made from unbleached, and often not fully processed, cotton. It may also contain unseparated husk parts. The fabric is coarser than muslin, but less coarse and thick than canvas or denim. It is still very cheap owing to its unfinished and undyed appearance.

The fabric was originally from the city of Calicut in southwestern India. It was made by the traditional weavers called cāliyans. The raw fabric was dyed and printed in bright hues, and calico prints became popular in Europe.

== History ==
=== Origins ===
Calico originated in Calicut, from which the name of the textile came, in India, now Kerala, during the 11th century, where the cloth was known as "chaliyan". It was mentioned in Indian literature by the 12th century when the polymath and writer Hemachandra described calico fabric prints with a lotus design. Calico was woven using Gujarati cotton from Surat for both the warp and weft. By the 15th century, calico from Gujarat made its appearance in Cairo, then capital of the Egypt Eyalet under the Ottoman Empire. Trade with Europe followed from the 17th century onwards.

=== Politics of cotton in the British Empire ===
In the 18th century, England was famous for its woollen and worsted cloth. That industry, centered in the east and south in towns such as Norwich, jealously protected their product. Cotton processing was tiny: in 1701, only 900,775 kilograms (1,985,868 lb) of cottonwool was imported into England, and by 1730 this had fallen to 701,014 kg (1,545,472 lb). This was due to commercial legislation to protect the woollen industry. Cheap calico prints, imported by the East India Company from Hindustān (India), had become popular. In 1700 the first of the Calico Acts was passed to prevent the import of dyed or printed calicoes from India, China or Persia. This caused demand to switch to imported grey cloth instead — calico that had not been finished-dyed or printed. These were printed with popular patterns in southern England. Also, Lancashire businessmen produced grey cloth with linen warp and cotton weft, known as fustian, which they sent to London for finishing. Cottonwool imports recovered though, and by 1720 were almost back to their 1701 levels. Coventry woollen manufacturers claimed that the imports were taking jobs away from their workers. The Woollen, etc., Manufactures Act 1720 was passed, enacting fines against anyone caught wearing printed or stained calico muslins, but neckcloths and fustians were exempted. The Lancashire manufacturers exploited this exemption; coloured cotton weft with linen warp were specifically permitted by the 1736 Manchester Act.

In 1764, 1,755,580 kg (3,870,392 lb) of cottonwool was imported.

In North America, the Sons of Liberty disguised themselves in calico as Indians during the Boston Tea Party. Participants in the Anti-Rent War of the early nineteenth century used this disguise to associate land monopoly in the Hudson Valley with the trade monopoly of the East India Company.

=== Calico printing ===
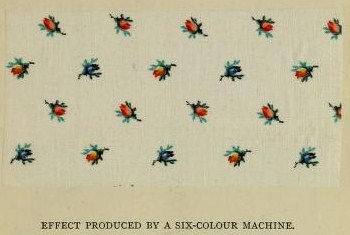
Sample of calico printed with a six-colour machine by Walter Crum & Co., from Frederick Crace Calvert, Dyeing and Calico Printing (1878)

Early Indian chintz, that is, glazed calico with a large floral pattern, was primarily produced using painting techniques. Later, the hues were applied by wooden blocks, and the cloth manufacturers in Britain printed calico using wooden block printing. Calico printers at work are depicted in one of the stained glass windows made by Stephen Adam for the Maryhill Burgh Halls, Glasgow. Confusingly, linen and silk printed this way were known as linen calicoes and silk calicoes. Early European calicoes (1680) were cheap plain weave white cotton fabric, or cream or unbleached cotton, with a design block-printed using a single alizarin dye fixed with two mordants, giving a red and black pattern. Polychromatic prints were possible, using two sets of blocks and an additional blue dye. The Indian taste was for dark printed backgrounds, while the European market preferred a pattern on a cream base. As the century progressed the European preference moved from the large chintz patterns to smaller, tighter patterns.

Thomas Bell patented a printing technique in 1783 that used copper rollers. In 1785, Livesey, Hargreaves and Company put the first machine that used this technique into operation in Walton-le-Dale, Lancashire. The production volume for printed cloth in Lancashire in 1750 was estimated at 50,000 pieces of 27 metres (30 yards); in 1850, it was 20,000,000 pieces. The commercial method of calico printing using engraved rollers was invented in 1821 in New Mills, Derbyshire, in the United Kingdom. John Potts of Potts, Oliver and Potts used a copper-engraved master to produce rollers to transfer the inks. After 1888, block printing was only used for short-run specialized jobs. After 1880, profits from printing fell due to overcapacity and the firms started to form combines. In the first, three Scottish firms formed the United Turkey Red Co. Ltd in 1897, and the second, in 1899, was the much larger Calico Printers' Association 46 printing concerns and 13 merchants combined, representing 85% of the British printing capacity. Some of this capacity was removed and in 1901 Calico had 48% of the printing trade. In 1916, they and the other printers formed and joined a trade association, which then set minimum prices for each 'price section' of the industry.

The trade association remained in operation until 1954, when the arrangement was challenged by the government Monopolies Commission. Over the intervening period much trade had been lost overseas.

== Terminology ==
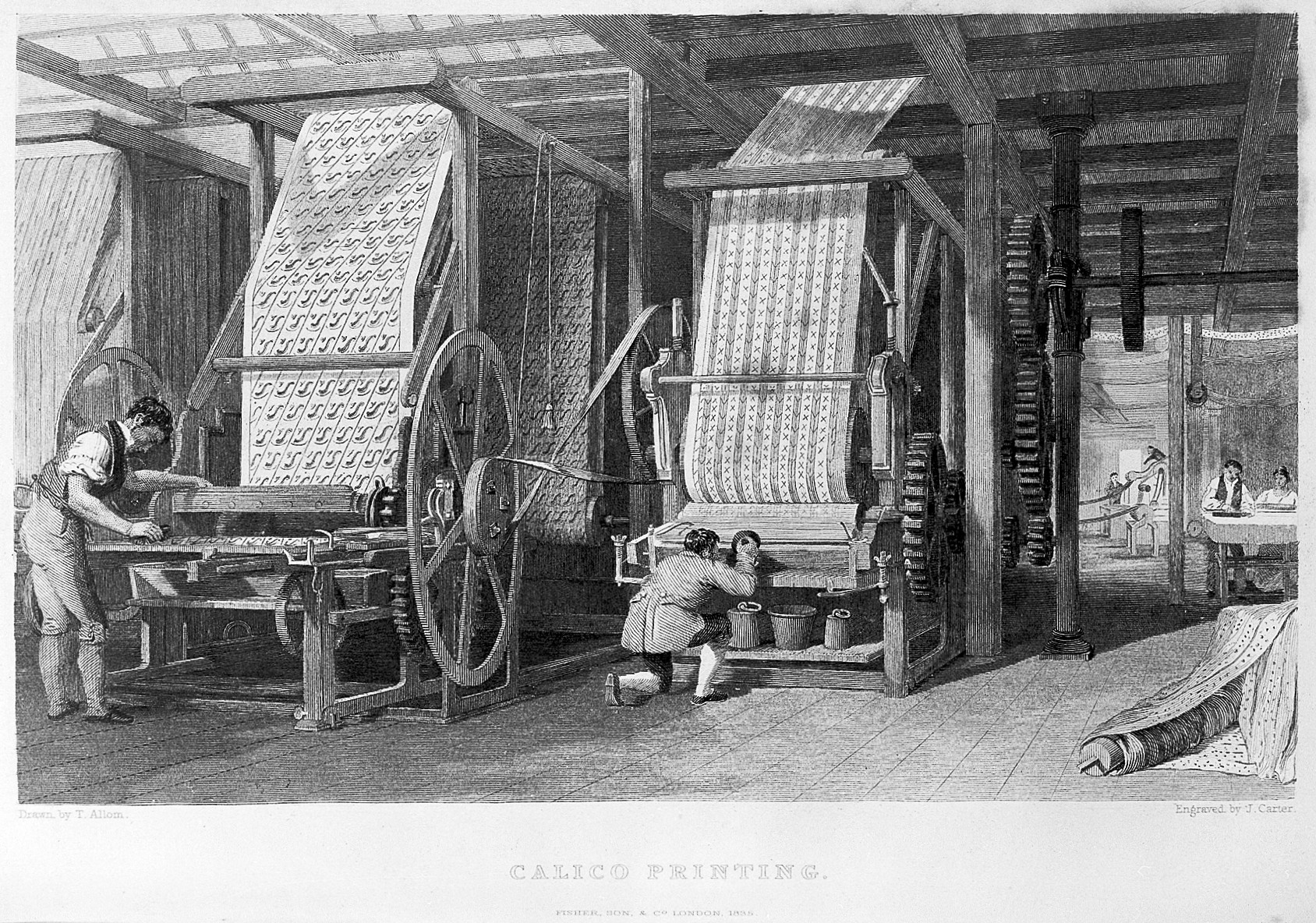
Calico printing (1835)

Printed calico was imported into the United States from Lancashire in the 1780s, and led to a linguistic separation: while Europe maintained the word calico for the fabric, in the US it was used to refer to the printed design, where these colourful, small-patterned printed fabrics also gave rise to the use of the word calico to describe a cat coat colour: calico cat. The patterned fabric also gave its name to common names for two North American crab species, Ovalipes ocellatus and Hepatus epheliticus.

In the UK, Australia and New Zealand:

- Calico – simple, cheap equal weft and warp plain weave fabric in white, cream or unbleached cotton
- Calico bag - a bag made of calico used by banks and other financial institutions
- Muslin – a very fine, light plain weave cotton fabric
- Muslin gauze – US: muslin – simple, cheap equal weft and warp plain weave fabric in white, cream or unbleached cotton and/or a very fine, light plain weave cotton fabric
- Gauze – extremely soft and fine cotton fabric with a very open plain weave
- Cheesecloth – US: gauze – any very light fabric, generally with a plain weave
- Tote bag - sometimes made of calico

In the US:

- Calico – cotton fabric with a small, all-over floral print
- Muslin – UK: muslin gauze – simple, cheap equal weft and warp plain weave fabric in white, cream or unbleached cotton and/or a very fine, light plain weave cotton fabric
- Muslin gauze – the very lightest, most open weave of muslin
- Gauze – UK: cheesecloth – any very light fabric, generally with a plain weave
- Cheesecloth – extremely soft and fine cotton fabric with a very open plain weave

== See also ==
- Bafta cloth
- Calico Acts
- Calico cat
- Calico (goldfish)
- Piece goods
