= Gowhole =

Hamlet in Derbyshire, England

Coordinates: 53.3523°N 1.9861°W

- Location within Derbyshire
- Civil parish: New Mills
- District: High Peak
- Shire county: Derbyshire
- Region: East Midlands
- Country: England
- Sovereign state: United Kingdom
- Police: Derbyshire
- Fire: Derbyshire
- Ambulance: East Midlands

Gowhole is a historical hamlet in the civil parish of New Mills, in the High Peak district, in Derbyshire, England, close to Birch Vale.

It was originally called Jawhill, after the Joule family, who are well-known to the area.
