= Municipal Borough of Glossop =

Borough of England

Coordinates: 53.443°N 1.949°W

Glossop
- Municipal Borough of Glossop shown within Derbyshire in 1970.
- Area
  - 1911: 3,052 acres (12.35 km^{2})
  - 1961: 3,323 acres (13.45 km^{2})
- Population
  - 1911: 21,688
  - 1961: 17,500
- History
  - Created: 1866
  - Abolished: 1974
  - Succeeded by: High Peak
- Status: Municipal Borough
- Government: Glossop Borough Council
  - HQ: Glossop

Glossop was a municipal borough in Derbyshire, England from 1866 to 1974. It was created under the Municipal Corporations Act 1835.

It was enlarged in 1934 when part of the civil parish of Charlesworth was incorporated into the borough.

The borough was abolished in 1974 under the Local Government Act 1972 and combined with the Municipal Borough of Buxton, the urban districts of New Mills and Whaley Bridge and the rural districts of Chapel en le Frith and Tintwistle to form the new High Peak district.

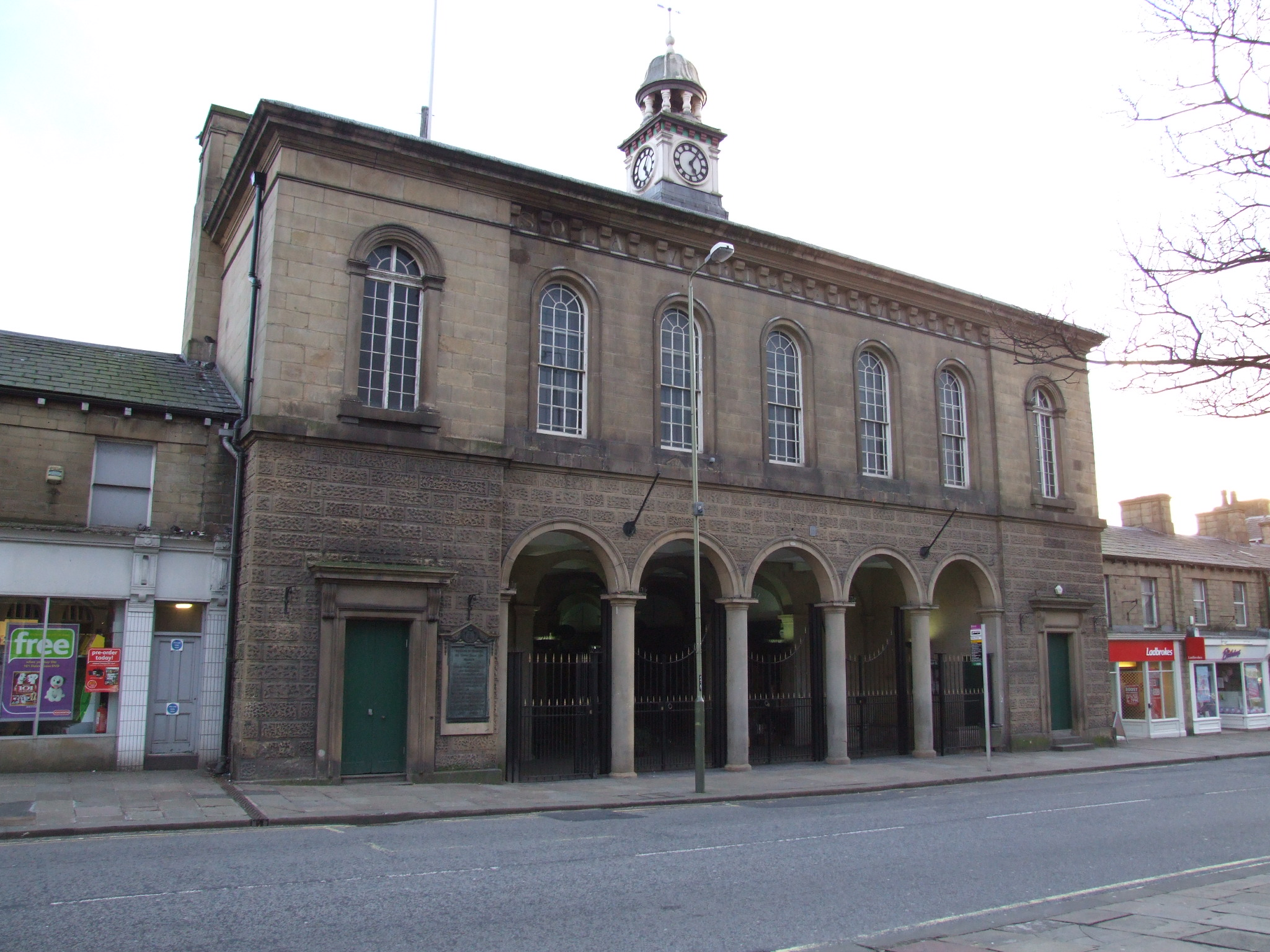
Glossop Town Hall, built 1838

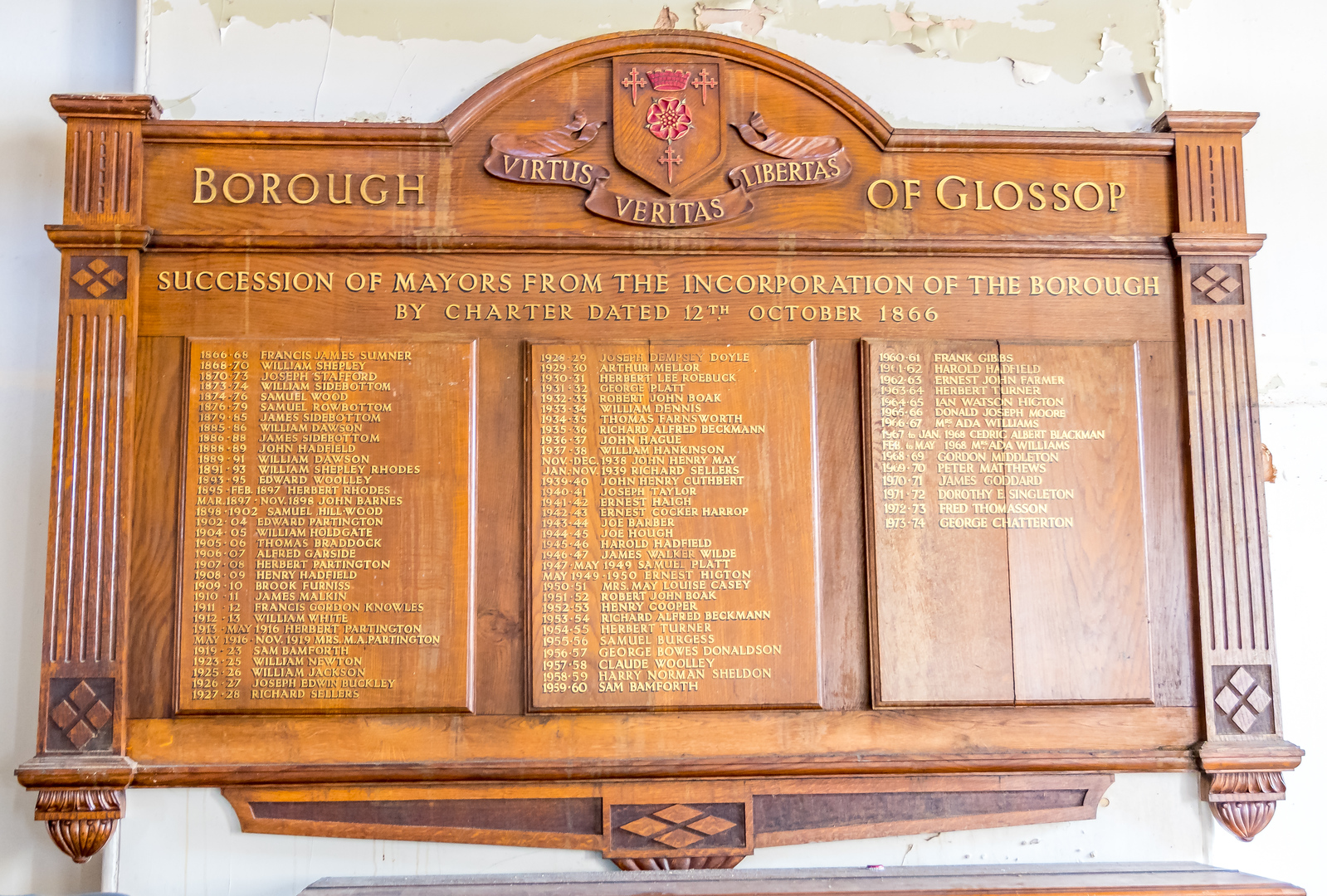
Plaque listing mayors of the Borough of Glossop 1866-1974
