= New Mills =

Town in Derbyshire, England

Coordinates: 53.367°N 2.007°W

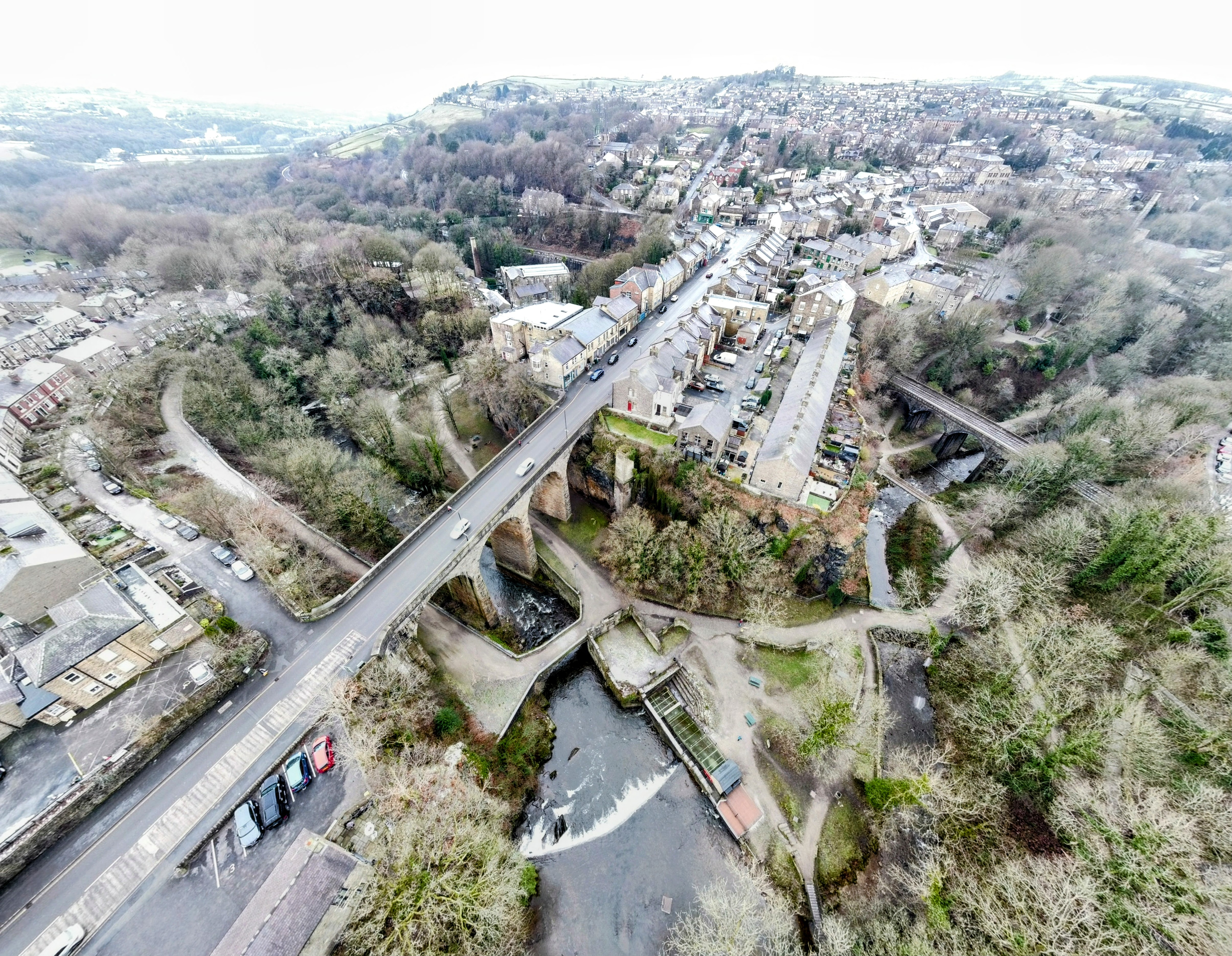
- Two rivers, two railways, a canal, and various roads all converge to form a town on differing levels. Hills rising out to the nearby Peak District surround the central viaducts and bridges.

- Location within Derbyshire
- Population: 12,291 (2011)
- OS grid reference: SJ995855
- Civil parish: New Mills
- District: High Peak
- Shire county: Derbyshire
- Region: East Midlands
- Country: England
- Sovereign state: United Kingdom
- Post town: HIGH PEAK
- Postcode district: SK22
- Dialling code: 01663
- Police: Derbyshire
- Fire: Derbyshire
- Ambulance: East Midlands
- UK Parliament: High Peak
- Website: New Mills Town Council

New Mills is a town in the Borough of High Peak, Derbyshire, England, 8 miles (13 km) south-east of Stockport and 13 miles (21 km) from Manchester at the confluence of the River Goyt and Sett. It is close to the border with Cheshire and above the Torrs, a 70 feet (21 m) deep gorge cut through carboniferous sandstone, on the north-western edge of the Peak District National Park.

New Mills has a population of approximately 12,000, in a civil parish which includes the villages and hamlets of Whitle, Thornsett, Hague Bar, Rowarth, Brookbottom, Gowhole and Birch Vale.

New Mills was first noted for coal mining, then for cotton spinning, bleaching and calico printing. It was served by the Peak Forest Canal, three railway lines and the A6 trunk road. Redundant mills were bought up in the mid-twentieth century by sweet manufacturer Swizzels Matlow. New Mills was a stronghold of Methodism.

New Mills is twinned with Alsfeld, Germany, and a road is named in honour of its twin town called Alsfeld Way.

== History ==
New Mills is in the area formerly known as Bowden Middlecale, which was a grouping of ten hamlets. The name of New Mylne (New Mills) was given to it from a corn-mill, erected in 1391, near to the present Salem Mill on the River Sett in the hamlet of Ollersett. This was adjacent to a convenient bridge over the Sett. By the late 16th century, the name was applied to the group of houses that grew up round it. Coal mining was the first industry of the area, with up to 40 small pits and mines exploiting the Yard Seam. The climate, good construction stone and the availability of stable land by fast-flowing water was ideal for cotton spinning. Cotton mills and print-works were built in the Torrs Gorge from 1788. Dwellings were built on the sides of the gorge, sometimes with one home built on top of another, both being entered at their respective street levels. Examples still exist on Station Road and Meal Street.

By 1810, New Mills had nine cotton mills, plus three weaving mills and at least three printworks.

Pigot's Directory 1835 describes New Mills:

NEW MILLS, an extensive hamlet, in the parish of Glossop, and in the High Peak hundred, is 14 miles from Manchester, 6 from Chapel-en-le-Frith, and 8 from Stockport. It is pleasantly situate on the borders of Derbyshire and Cheshire; and, within a comparatively few years, has risen to importance in the manufacturing district; cotton spinning being carried on here to a considerable extent, affording employment to numerous hands. The factories are in a great measure hidden from public view in passing through the village, being built at the foot of the stream, under high towering rocks. Good house coal, as well as other kinds for the purposes of machinery, is obtained near to the village, the top bed strata running from sixteen to twenty inches thick. The village is built chiefly upon a stone quarry, but the soil in many parts is fertile, producing good crops of wheat and potatoes.

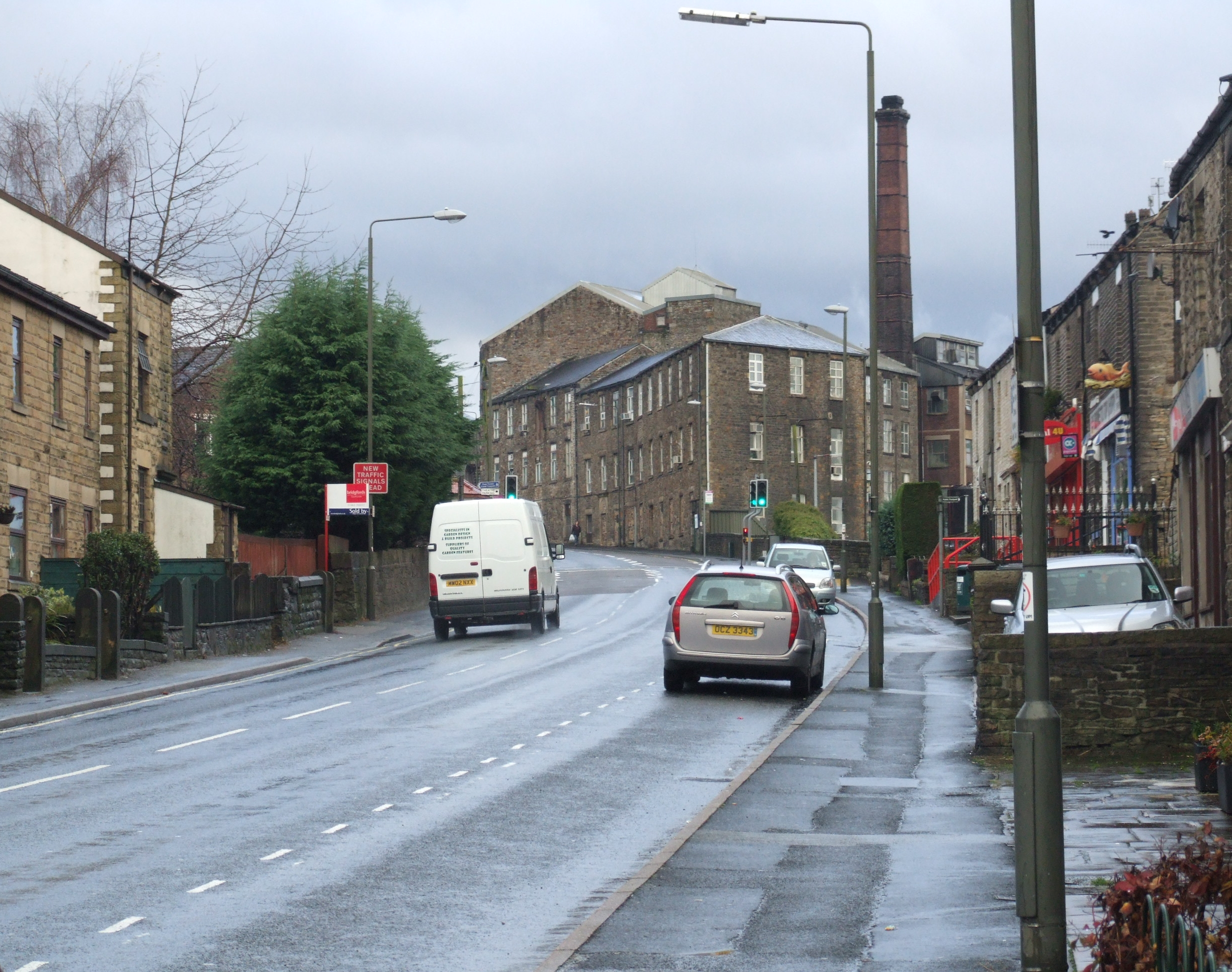
Swizzels Matlow, Newtown (top)

A second group of 'later' mills formed by the newly opened Peak Forest Canal in Newtown, a hamlet 800 metres (2,600 ft) away on the other side of the Goyt in what was then the parish of Disley in Cheshire. Increasingly these mills and houses merged into New Mills. The soft iron-free water was suitable for bleaching and finishing and printing. With the advent of steam, and the growth of the canal network to transport raw cotton, coal and the finished product, bigger mills were built and the smaller isolated rural mills were no longer competitive. By 1846, most of New Mills' mills had stopped spinning. The small mills moved out of cotton; the larger mills along the canal moved into finishing. Torr Vale Mill had added a weaving shed in 1836, and moved into producing towelling.

The commercial method of calico printing using engraved rollers was invented in 1821 in New Mills. John Potts of Potts, Oliver and Potts used a copper-engraved master to produce rollers to transfer the inks.

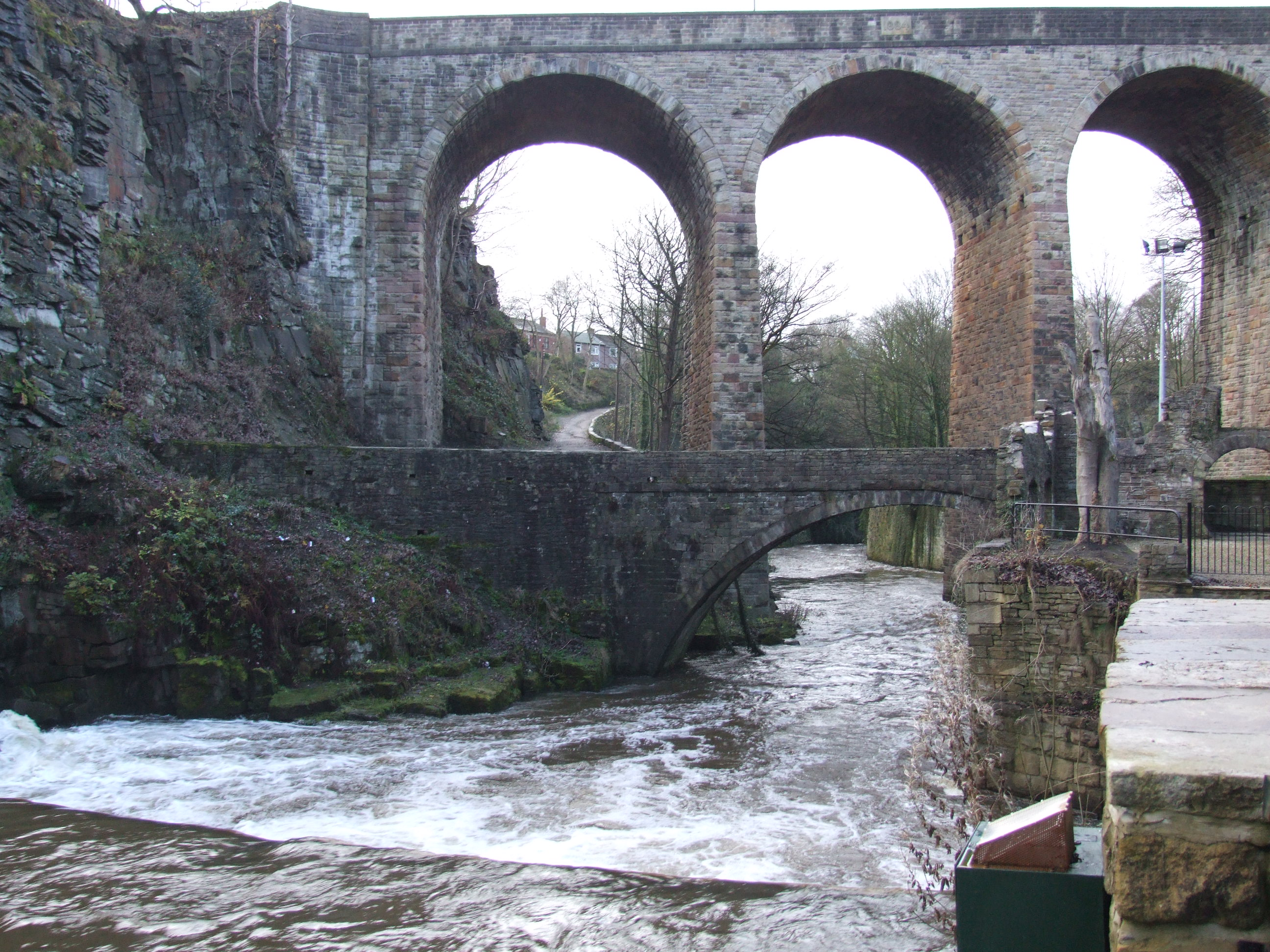
The Union Bridge and the packhorse bridge it replaces. The gritstone strata of the gorge are visible.

Before the construction of the high-level bridges the Torrs was a major obstacle; traffic had to descend 70 feet (21 m) to cross the Goyt and then climb the same height on the other bank. The first bridge to be constructed was the Queens Bridge on Church Road. The Union Road bridge was built in 1884; obtaining the land was difficult, as the arches needed to pass close to Torr Mill and properties on the Cheshire (south) bank, and Torr Top Hall had to be demolished. The new road was named after the 'union' of the two halves of the town. The first station in New Mills was at Newtown, on the Stockport, Disley and Whaley Bridge Railway; this opened on 9 June 1855. This followed the line of the Peak Forest Canal staying safely away from the Torrs. The Sheffield and Midland Railway Companies' Committee company built two viaducts across the Goyt: one for a line to New Mills Central that opened in 1864, and one for the fast line through the Disley Tunnel which opened in 1904.

Cotton continued to be worked at Torr Vale Mill until 2000, giving the mill over two hundred years of service.

In the great storm of June 1872, Grove Mill and Torr Vale weir were destroyed; at Rock Mill, then being used to make paper, two blocks of buildings and considerable stock and some machinery were lost, but the only fatalities were two cows.

The River Goyt at about two o'clock a.m. on Wednesday was from 12ft to 14ft above its usual height...At New Mills, where the Goyt is joined by the River Kinder, extensive damage was done to property. The paper works of Messrs. Schlosser and Co. were damaged upwards of £1,500 as two blocks of buildings were completely washed away – one portion contained a large quantity of paper. The works of Mr. W.S. Lowe also sufferd severely, the damage being estimated at £300. Two strong stone weirs were washed away and two bridges; many acres of land were flooded. – Manchester Times

This was minor compared with events at Whaley Bridge, where Toddbrook Reservoir was overtopped and another reservoir known as Adsheads Pools breached completely, the waters sweeping through the centre of the village of Hurdsfield. The June 1930 flood was more serious for New Mills. Heavy rain over the area culminating in a cloudburst over Rowarth caused the River Sett to rise rapidly by up to 20 feet (6.1 m). Many properties on Brookside were flooded and destroyed and one rescuer was drowned. Hyde Bank Road was engulfed and buildings collapsed at Arnfield's foundry. At Rowarth, the remains of the Little Mill and the landlord of the Little Mill Inn were swept away. At Watford Bridge the river took away part of the printworks, and at Bate Mill gouged a new channel taking with it the sewage plant, 250 tons of coal, most of the road and the gas main. At Birch Vale, the problem was caused by the waters cascading down from Lantern Pike; the culvert being inadequate, the roadways became rivers washing away sections of walling. Much livestock perished.

A model of the town under construction in 1884 can be found in New Mills Heritage and Information Centre, which is run and managed by volunteers and funded and managed by New Mills Town Council.

== Government ==
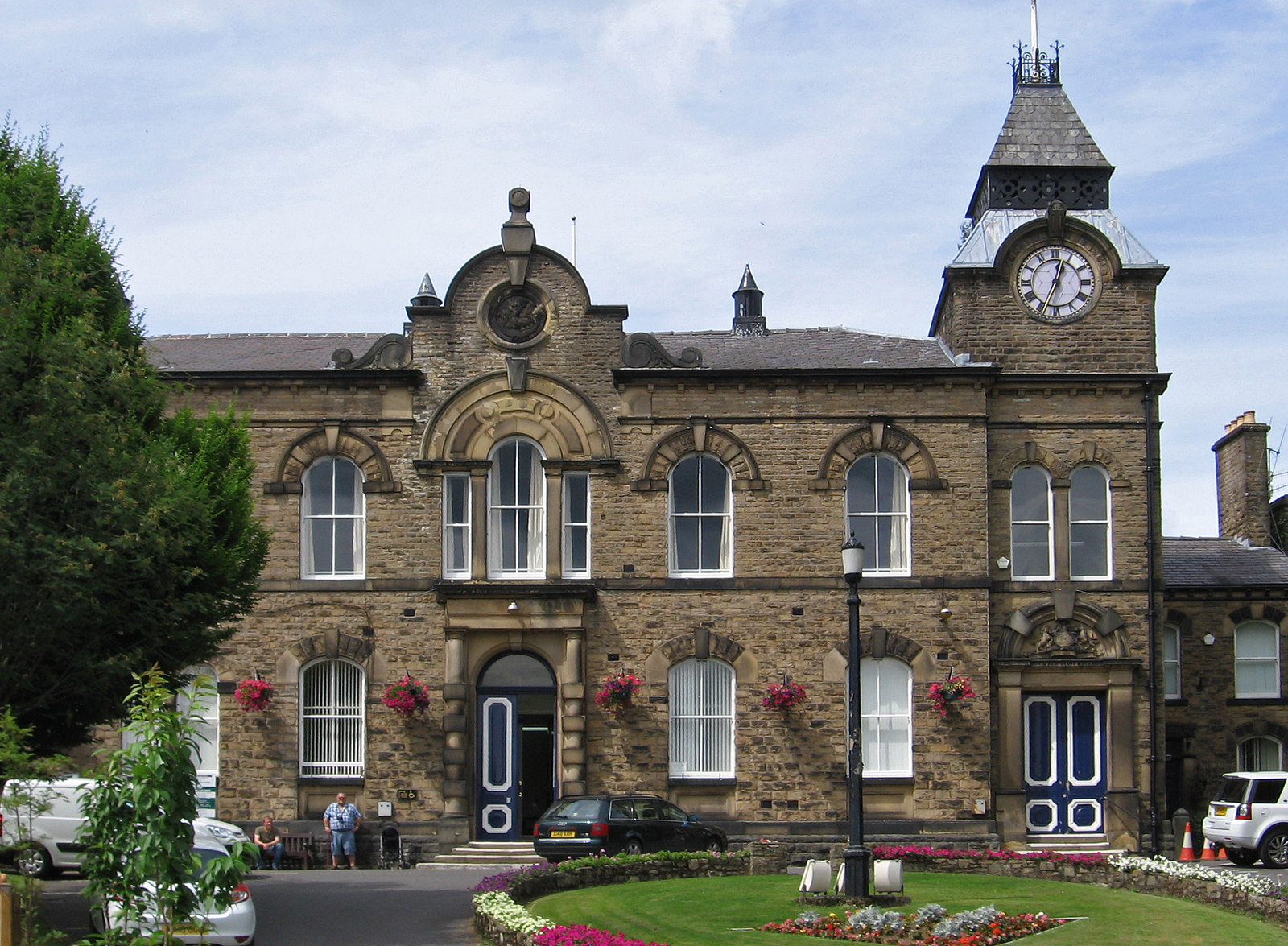
New Mills Town Hall (built 1871, clock tower added 1875)

Now almost entirely in Derbyshire, New Mills straddled the historic county boundaries of Derbyshire and Cheshire. The traditional boundary was the River Goyt: Low Leighton, Torr Top and Hide Bank were always in Derbyshire, but Torr Vale Road and all of Newtown were in Cheshire. Today, all the housing to the west of the traffic lights on the A6 remains in the civil parish of Disley in Cheshire.

The area was part of the Royal Forest of the Peak which passed into the hands of the Duchy of Lancaster in 1372. The ten hamlets, in three groups:

- Great Hamlet, Phoside and Kinder;
- Beard, Ollersett, Thornsett and Whitle;
- Chinley, Bugsworth and Brownside

made up Bowden Middlecale. The new manorial mill or the New Mylne of 1391 was at Beard. In 1713, the hamlets of Beard, Ollersett, Thornsett and Whitle were formed into a township and a new corn mill was built at Ollersett. This was superseded by the New Mills Urban Sanitary Authority in 1876. The New Mills Urban District Council operated from 1894 until 1974, when it was abolished. The town now has a town council, and is part of High Peak Council, and Derbyshire County Council. On the County Council, New Mills is in the New Mills division along with Hayfield and Sett. The seat is held by Anne Clarke for the Labour Party. On High Peak Council, Sett has one councillor, New Mills East elects two councillors and New Mills West elects two councillors. New Mills Town Council is the local level of elected governance.

Jon Pearce, a Labour Party member, is the member of parliament for the High Peak constituency.

== Geography ==
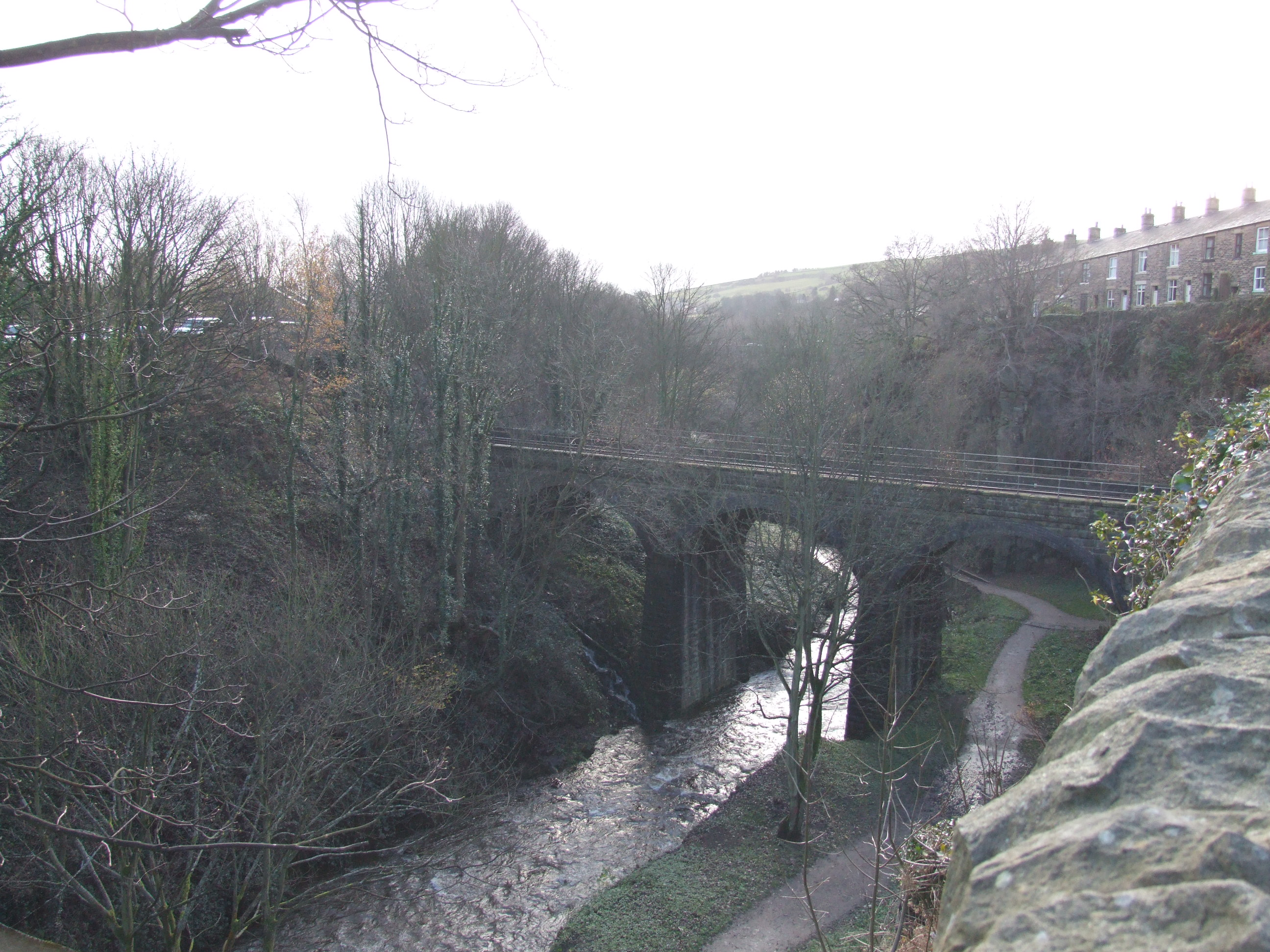
The Torrs is a gorge through Woodhead Hill Sandstone in New Mills. The River Sett approaches its confluence with the River Goyt. Spanning the Sett is the 1864 viaduct on the Hope Valley Line, which has emerged from a tunnel on the right, under Union Road.

New Mills is approximately 182 miles (293 km) NNW of London and 8 miles (13 km) south-east of Stockport. It borders on Disley, in Cheshire, and Marple, in the Stockport Metropolitan Borough in Greater Manchester. The town is on the north-western edge of the Peak District, but only the eastern part of the parish is within the official boundaries of the National Park. The town includes the hamlets of Thornsett, Hague Bar, Rowarth, Brookbottom, Gowhole, and most of Birch Vale. Various parts of the town are given local names: Eaves Knoll (north-western part between Brook Bottom Road and Castle Edge Road); High Lee (northern part between Castle Edge Road and the River Sett); Hidebank (the area on the eastern side of the River Sett and north and west of the A6015); Low Leighton (the area south and east of the A6015); and Torr Top (the area around the confluence of the rivers).

At its lowest point the parish is about 120 m (390 ft) above sea level, but the valley sides rise to 370 m (1,210 ft) at the highest points above Rowarth. The watercourses to the north, particularly the Rowarth Brook, drain the southward slopes of Mellor Moor, Cown Edge and Lantern Pike. The Sett and its tributary the Kinder drain much of the plateau of Kinder Scout; the Sett flows through Hayfield before passing through Birch Vale to the Torrs and the River Goyt. The Goyt rises on the moors of Axe Edge, near the River Dane and the Cat and Fiddle Inn between Buxton and Macclesfield. It passes through Whaley Bridge, where it is joined by the Todd Brook and the Black Brook from Chapel-en-le-Frith. The sides of the Goyt valley have been used to carry two railway lines, the Peak Forest Canal and the A6 trunk road from London to Carlisle via Manchester; these all pass through New Mills.

Geologically speaking, New Mills lies in the north–south-orientated syncline known as the Goyt Trough. The base rocks are from the Carboniferous period, with underlying Namurian gritstone sandstones, from 333 M a.to 313 M a. Above there are coal measures present (Langsettian from 312 M a.). This was folded in the Variscan orogeny into the Goyt Trough syncline. Coal has been mined at over 30 locations in the area, including Pingot Pit. There are three narrow seams of coal present: the Red Ash, Little Mine and the Yard Seam. The Yard Coal is so named because that is the average thickness of the seam; it is the lowest seam and rests on Woodhead Hill Sandstone. In these seams lead ore has also been extracted. Beardmoor Colliery, Ollersett or Burnt Edge Colliery and Lee or New Mills Colliery all worked the 3-foot (0.91 m) seam. 1 cubic yard (0.76 m^{3}) of coal weighs about half an imperial ton, and the Yard Seam would produce 4,500 tons per acre. Bigrave Edge or Broadmoor Edge Colliery worked the Red Ash seam, which was only 18 inches (460 mm) thick.

The syncline was buried in younger rocks of the Tertiary Period. These were eroded, not least by the scouring of the ice age ice sheets and the pressures of the meltwaters when temperatures rose. New Mills was on the margins of glaciation, and the meltwaters sought additional routes under the ice for run off. They exploited faults and crevices in the underlying rock. In the Torrs Gorge, the Rivers Goyt and Sett cut a new channel into the strata of the Woodhead Hill Sandstone which forms the centre of New Mills. A mantle of glacial sediment, principally gravels, covered the whole of the braided valleys. In the Pleistocene period, of 12.9 k a to 11.6 k a, the rivers re-formed into single channels, and meanders were formed. These became very distorted above the constrictions of the gorges. Down cutting occurred, exposing previous layers, creating terraces that were covered with silty clay alluvium.

== Economy ==
New Mills' economy was originally built on agriculture, then coal mining and then cotton spinning and bleaching. There was a little weaving but cotton bleaching and calico printing continued into the second half of the 20th century. The mills have now all closed. Today Swizzels Matlow, who make children's sweets, is a large employer. The company transferred to New Mills from London during the Blitz and has remained ever since.

There is also a history of iron working, though this has ceased. Ironstone was also found in shales of the lower coal measures, and early water-powered charcoal furnaces were located at Gow-Hole furnace towards Furness Vale. In the 19th century, the Midland Iron Works occupied Barnes Mill in the Torrs; the Victoria Foundry was on Hyde Bank Road (among their products were gas lamp posts for the town council) as was the other small foundry in Wilde's scrapyard. On Albion Road in Newtown is John Hawthorn's foundry. There was also a brass foundry, on the site of the current Heritage Centre.

Tourism was boosted in 1984 when the Torrs was reopened as a riverside park, and further when the Millennium Walkway opened in 1999, joining the two ends of the gorge.

The Plain English Campaign has its headquarters in the town.

Since 2015, New Mills has had a commercial microbrewery, Torrside Brewing, located within an industrial unit at New Mills Marina.

== Landmarks ==
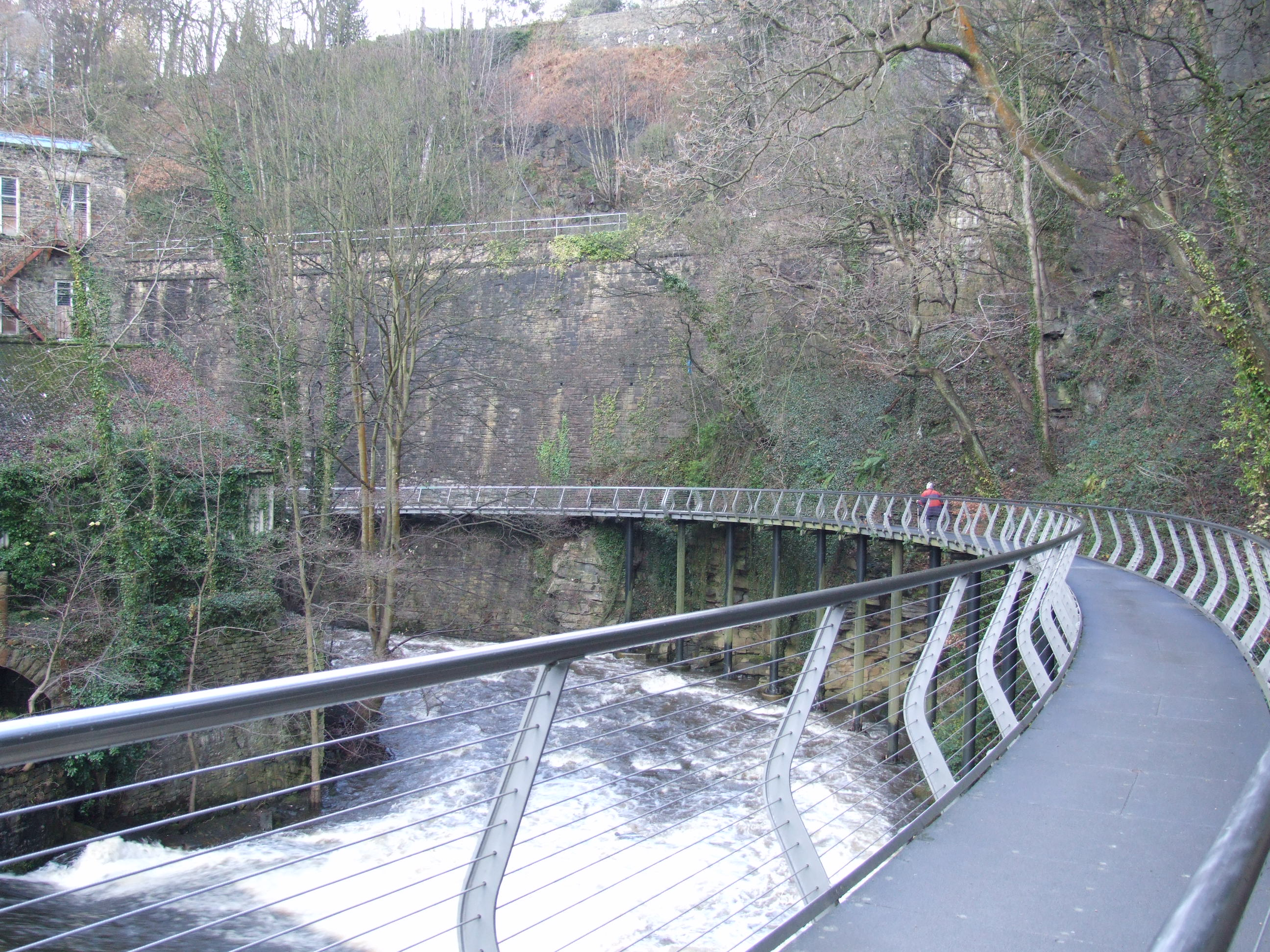
The Millennium Walkway showing the part cantilevered from the railway embankment, and the part supported by pillars set in the river bed

New Mills sits above The Torrs, a dramatic gorge through which the Rivers Goyt and Sett flow. In a bend of the Goyt is Torr Vale Mill, a Grade II* listed building. The Torrs Millennium Walkway, overlooking the mill, was built at a cost of £525,000 (with almost half provided by the Millennium Commission) by Derbyshire County Council's in-house engineers and designed by Stan Brewster. The walkway spans the otherwise inaccessible cliff wall above the River Goyt. Part rises from the riverbed on stilts and part is cantilevered off the railway retaining wall. It provided the final link in the 225-mile (362 km) Midshires Way (here following the Goyt Way) and was opened in April 2000.

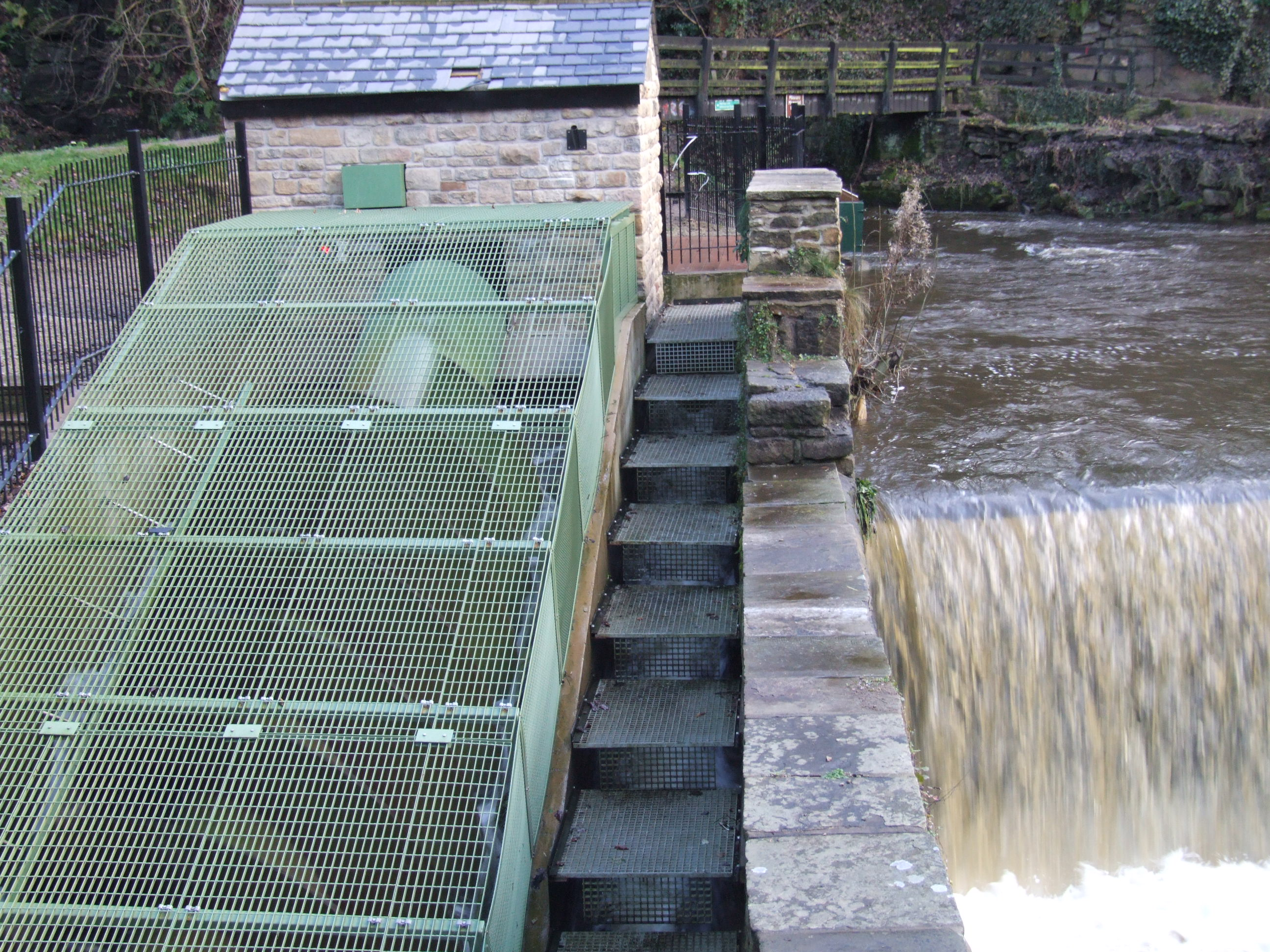
Torrs Hydro

Torrs Hydro is a 2.4-metre (7 ft 10 in) diameter screw turbine at the Torr Weir on the Goyt. The "Reverse Archimedean Screw" micro hydroelectric scheme generates 50 kW of electricity. Nicknamed "Archie", it is owned by the community. The electricity is supplied to the local Co-operative supermarket and any excess is fed back into the National Grid.

== Religious sites ==
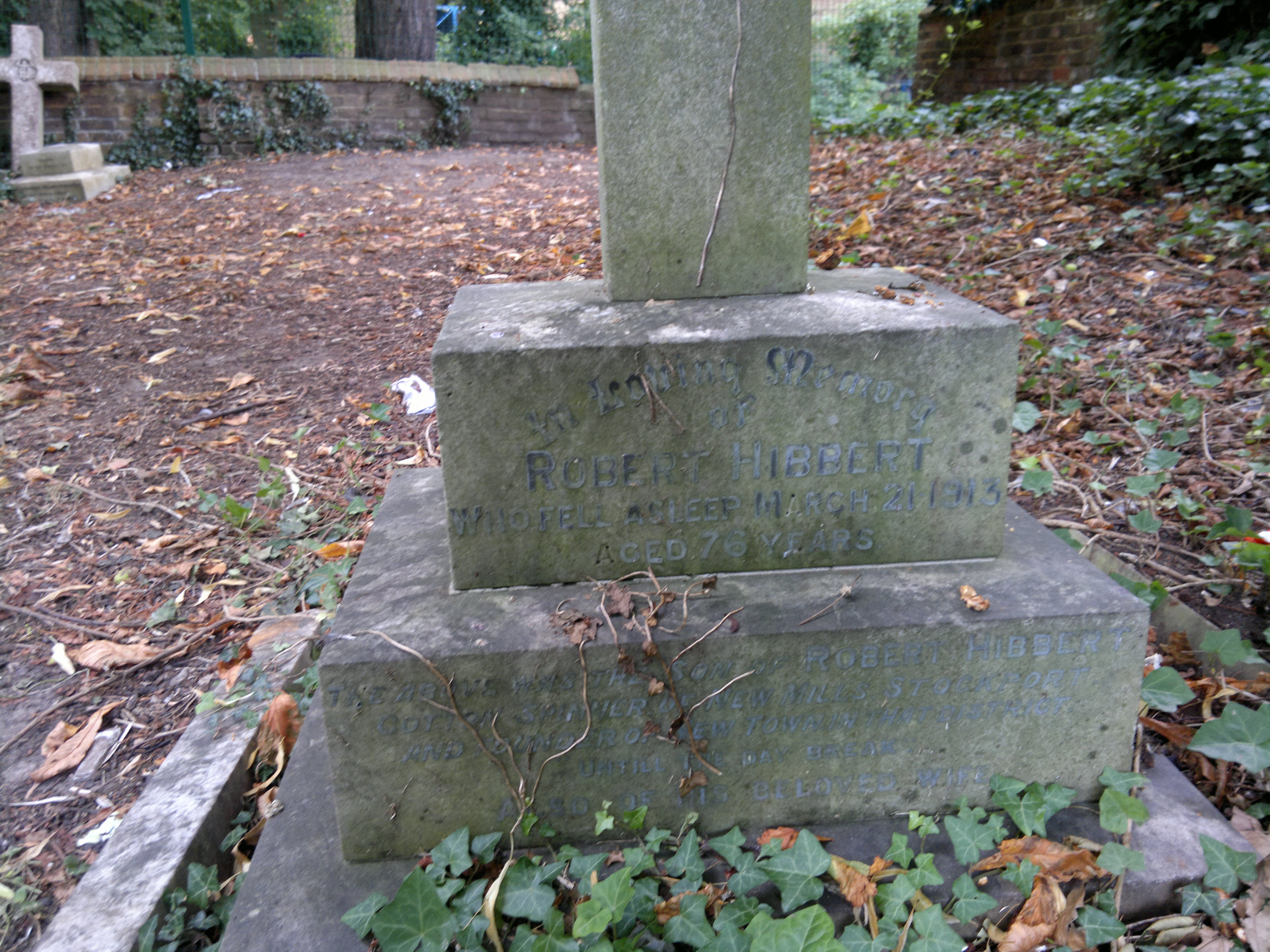
"Robert Hibbert 21 March 1913 Aged 76 Cotton Spinner New Mills Stockport and founder of new town in that district"

The area around Mellor and New Mills has a strong Methodist tradition. John Wesley first preached in the area in 1740, at a sheepfold at the Bongs in neighbouring Mellor. He visited again on 28 April 1745, 12 May 1747 and 31 August 1748. The Wesleyan Methodists were established in 1748. At first, meetings were held in people's homes; then land was bought on the High Street for a Wesleyan chapel in 1766. This was the first place of worship in the town. Wesley visited again in 1768, 1772, 1774, 1776, 1779, 1782 and 1788. By 1808 that chapel was too small, and a larger one was built in St Georges Road, Brookside (Low Leighton). The church was influential and many of the millowners were members: Samuel Schofield, of Warksmoor House and of Torr Mill, the Armstrongs of Torr Vale Mill, the Hibbert family, including Robert Hibbert, of Warksmoor who built the first cotton mill in Newtown, the Barnes, Thatchers, Arnfields, Bridges, Willans and Bennetts, all industrialists, are buried in the chapel except Robert Hibbert who is buried at St Mary's Slough. The larger chapel was closed and demolished in the 1960s and the Methodists have reverted to the High Street Chapel. The Association Methodists' stone chapel was erected in 1838, and the Primitive Methodists built one in 1827. The Friends Meeting House dating from 1717 is in Low Leighton, and the independents, the Congregational (Independent) church, "Providence", was built on Mellor Road, Whitle, in 1823.

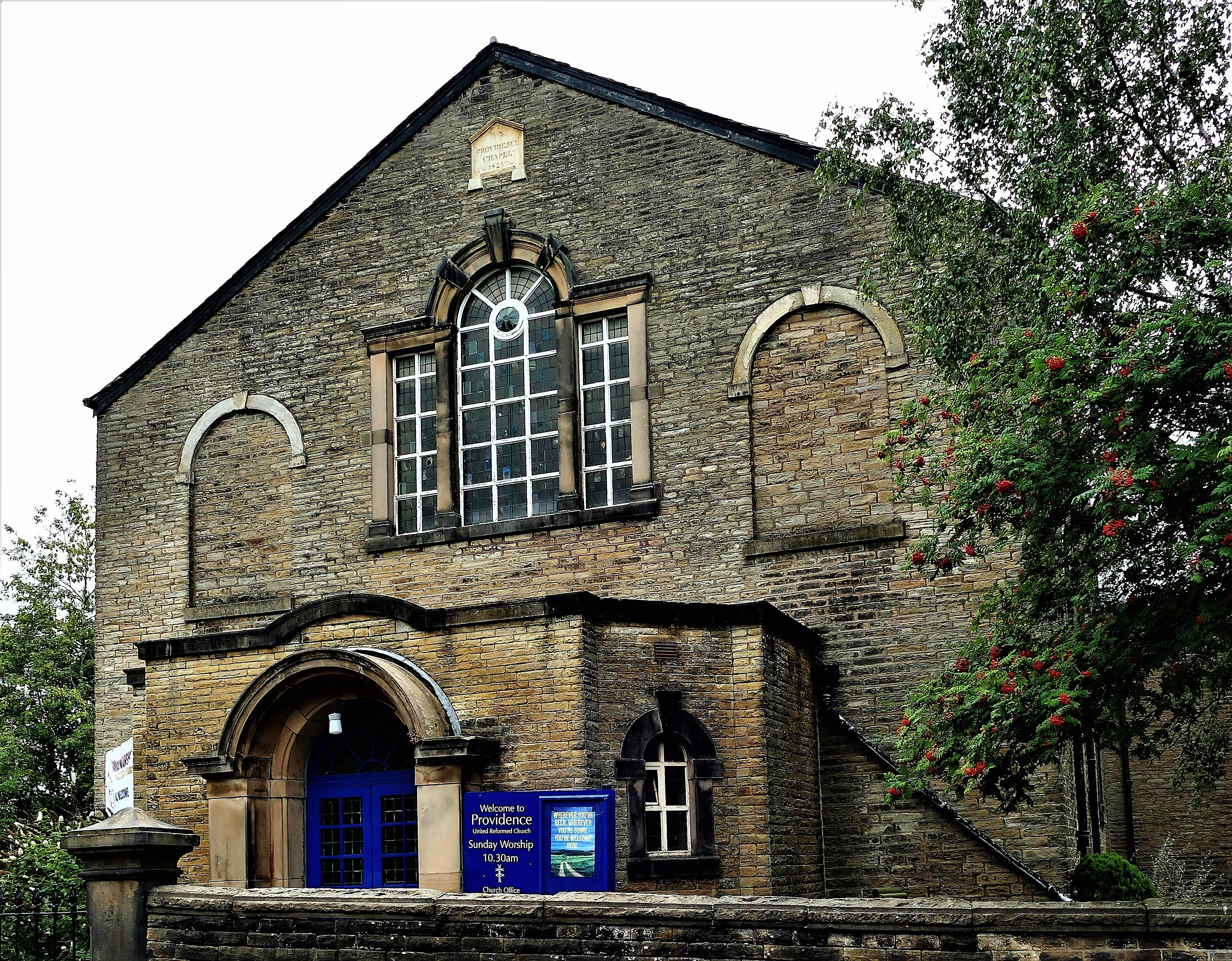
Providence United Reformed Church – exterior view

The hamlets of Bowden Middlecale and Mellor were originally in the ancient parish of Glossop. Chapelries were established at Mellor and Hayfield, and New Mills was split between the two. The Church of England parish church of St George's was built in 1829–30 to a simple renaissance plan with galleries; it has seven bays, decorated with simple Gothic-style lancet windows. In 1844, the hamlets of Beard, Ollersett, Thornsett and Whitle became a parish. The Anglican church of St James the Less was designed by William Swinden Barber in 1880. It became redundant, was restored in 2012, and became Spring Bank Arts Centre.

The Church of the Annunciation, St. Mary's Road, is the Roman Catholic church. It is in the parish of St Mary's, Marple Bridge and New Mills in the Diocese of Nottingham. The building was built in the Decorated Gothic style in 1846; its spire is 110 feet (34 m) tall.

== Transport ==
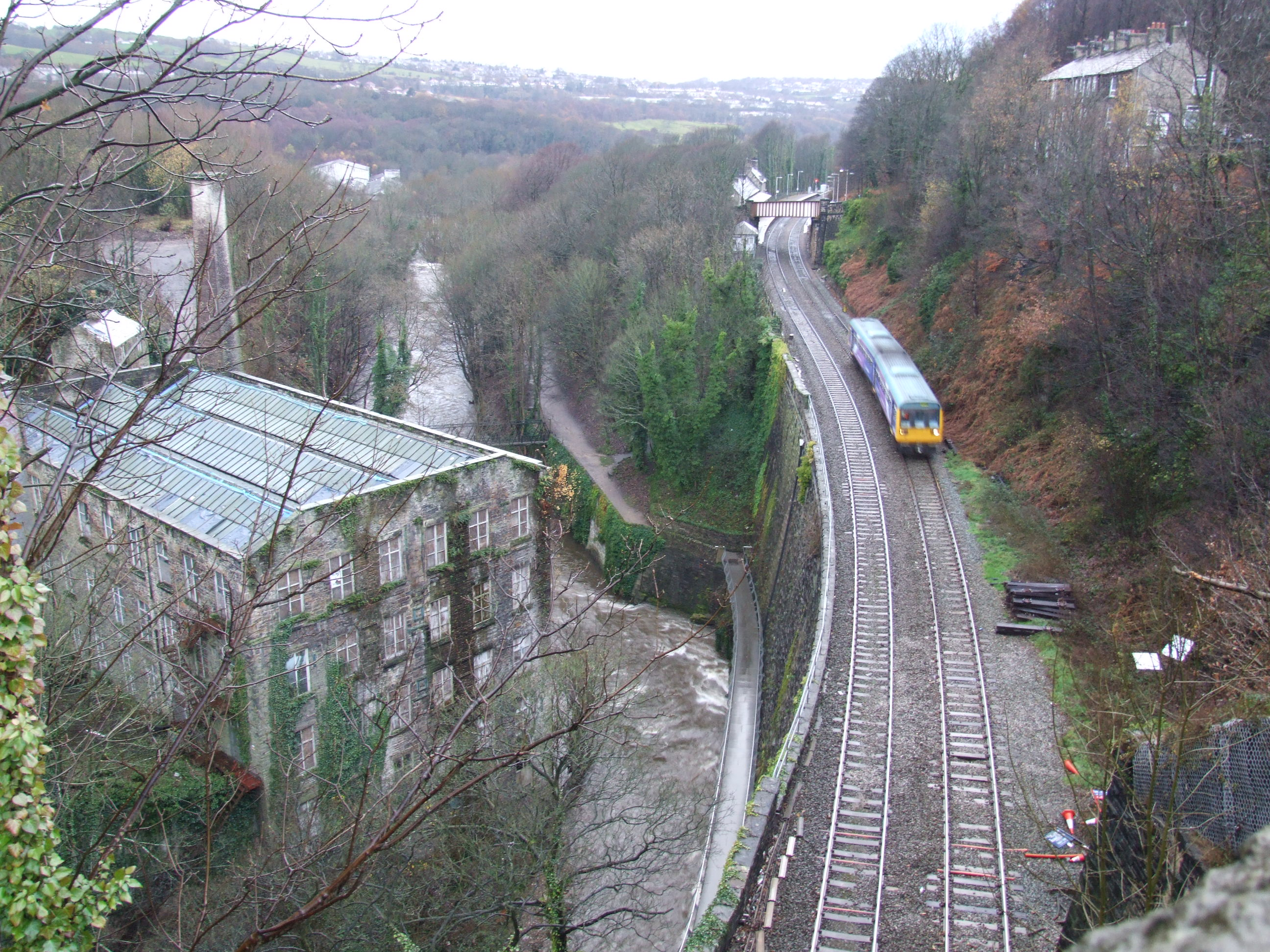
New Mills Central railway station lies 70 feet (21 m) above the River Goyt in the Torrs. Beneath the railway is the Millennium Walkway, with Torr Vale Mill on the opposite bank

=== Railway ===
The town is served by two railway stations:

- New Mills Central on the Hope Valley Line, which lies on the north bank of the River Goyt. Northern Trains operates services between Manchester Piccadilly and Sheffield
- New Mills Newtown on the Buxton Line, which runs on the south bank on the 175 m (574 ft) contour. Northern Trains operates services between Manchester Piccadilly, Stockport and Buxton.

The main Manchester to Sheffield 'fast' line passes through between the town centre and Newtown, bypassing both stations. It emerges from Disley Tunnel on a lower (150 m (490 ft)) contour than the canal on the south bank, crosses the Goyt on a viaduct and is joined by the Hope Valley Line at New Mills South Junction.

Until January 1970, the Hayfield branch of the Midland Railway connected New Mills Central with Hayfield; this route's closure was one of the last recommended in 1963 by Richard Beeching's rationalisation programme. It is now the Sett Valley Trail, a shared-use path which runs for 2 1/2 miles north-east out of the town.

=== Buses ===
New Mills town centre and bus station are served by several routes:

- High Peak operates the 60 between Macclesfield and Hayfield, the 61 between Glossop and Buxton and the 389 Town Service, which serves various points in and around the town
- Stagecoach Manchester operates the 358, which connects Stockport, Marple and Hayfield.

Another High Peak service, the 199, also serves Newtown throughout the day; it connects Buxton, Stockport and Manchester Airport.

=== Roads ===
The A6 passes through Newtown, running close to the Buxton railway line; it travels north towards Stockport and Manchester, and south towards Chapel-en-le-Frith and Buxton. The main road running through New Mills is the A6015, which connects it to the A6 and to Hayfield. The B6101 also connects the town to neighbouring Marple.

=== Canal ===
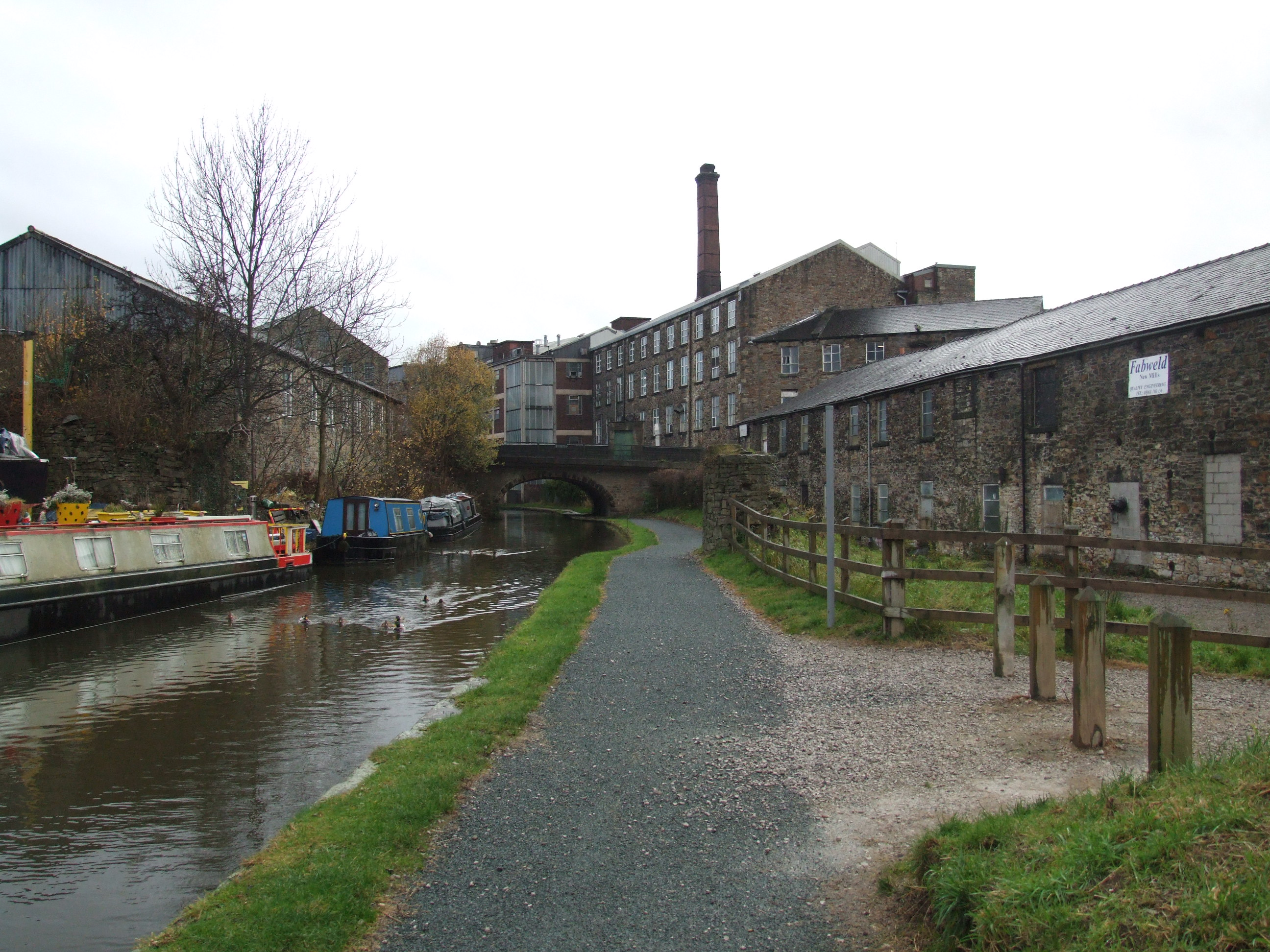
The Peak Forest Canal wharf at Newtown

The Peak Forest Canal was watered in 1796. It passes through Newtown, where there is a marina known as New Mills Marina, following the 155 m (509 ft) contour. The canal heads north towards Disley and Marple, and south towards Whaley Bridge.

== Culture and community ==
New Mills Town Council hosts a free bonfire and fireworks display in High Lea Park during November, which in 2013 attracted an estimated 3,000 people. New Mills also plays host to the One World Festival every year, also in High Lea Park. The biggest event in the town's cultural calendar is New Mills Festival. Held during the last two weeks of September, it is two weeks of talks, walks, gigs, concerts, exhibitions, sport, competitions with a lantern procession and street party on the last Saturday.

New Mills Band (1812), formerly known as New Mills Old Prize Band, originated in New Mills in 1812. The band still rehearse and perform in the local area. They are reputed to be one of the oldest brass bands still in existence.

== Local media ==
Regional TV news comes from Salford-based BBC North West and ITV Granada. Television signals are received from the Winter Hill and one of the two local relay transmitters (Birch Vale and Ladder Hill). Local radio stations are BBC Radio Manchester on 95.1 FM and High Peak Radio on 106.6 FM.

The town's local newspapers are the Buxton Advertiser and the Manchester Evening News.

== Education ==
The principal secondary school is New Mills School. This comprehensive school occupies the buildings of the former New Mills Grammar School and educates children from 11 to 16 years of age; its sixth-form closed in 2018. There are six primary schools: St. George's School (CE), St. Mary's (RC), New Mills County Primary, Newtown, Hague Bar and Thornsett.

== Conservation Area ==
New Mills town centre has been designated a Conservation Area, originally established in 1985, although it has been extended several times since then. Currently, the Conservation Area extends to encompass the Jodrell Street, Spring Bank and High Lea areas of the town.

High Peak Borough Council have produced a Conservation Area Character Appraisal document, outlining the reasons that the Conservation Area has been designated as such. In justifying the reasons for designation, this document states of the town: "New Mills is a town of dramatic topography and origins that date back to the 14th century. Its topography and the supply of fast flowing waters led to its development as a thriving mill town and important centre for the textile industry. Its impressive landscape developed much of its developed form and the townscape that we still see today."

== Sport and leisure ==
New Mills A.F.C. ('The Millers') are the local football team and play in the North West Counties League Division One South. The football ground at Church Lane boasts two pitches — one 'all weather' — and floodlights. New Mills Cricket Club, with their ground on Church Road, play in the Derbyshire and Cheshire League. There is a leisure centre, including a swimming pool, which opened in 1980. Until the early 1980s, the town held an annual cycle race.

New Mills Golf Club is a members' club set on the top of the northerly hill overlooking the town, with views of Kinder Scout, the city of Manchester and the Welsh mountains. The course was formed in 1907 and extended to its current 18-hole, 5,604-yard par 69 course in 2002 before the clubhouse extension and centenary celebration in 2007.

== Notable residents ==
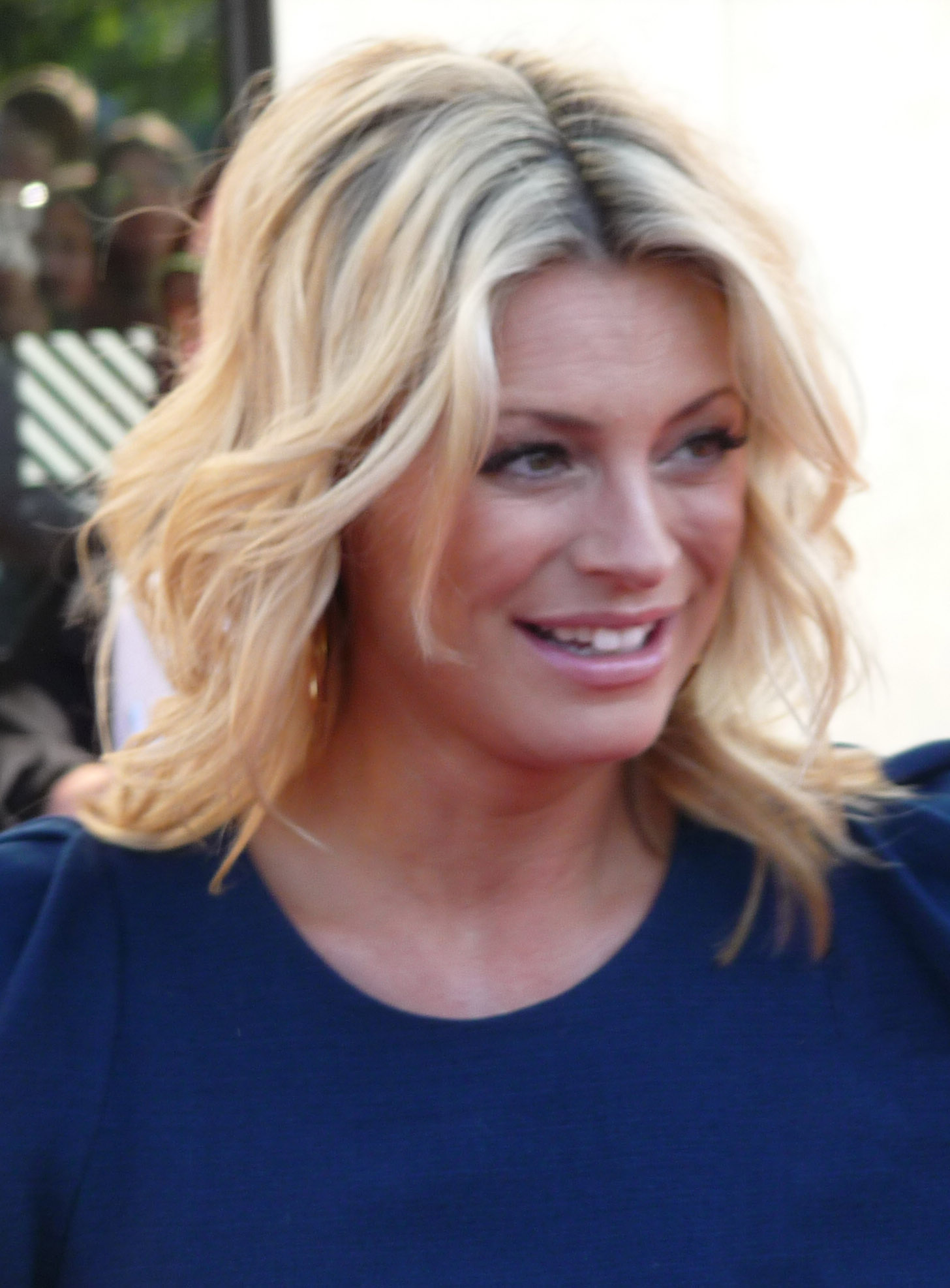
Tess Daly, 2009

- Benjamin Brandreth (1809–1880), British-American businessman, pioneer in using mass advertising for his product, a purgative.
- Peter Cameron (1847–1912), amateur entomologist who specialised in Hymenoptera
- William Chatterton (1861–1913), cricketer and footballer, he played 289 first-class cricket matches for Derbyshire County Cricket Club
- Joseph Chatterton (1867–1886), cricketer, who played 11 first-class cricket matches for Derbyshire
- Gerald Wyatt (1933–2001), cricketer who played 11 first-class cricket matches for Derbyshire
- Tony Audenshaw (born 1965), actor and singer, played Bob Hope in Emmerdale, lives in the town.
- Tess Daly (born 1969), TV presenter and former model, she co-presented the BBC One dancing competition show Strictly Come Dancing, brought up locally
- Blitz (1980–2007), a street punk band, originated in New Mills.

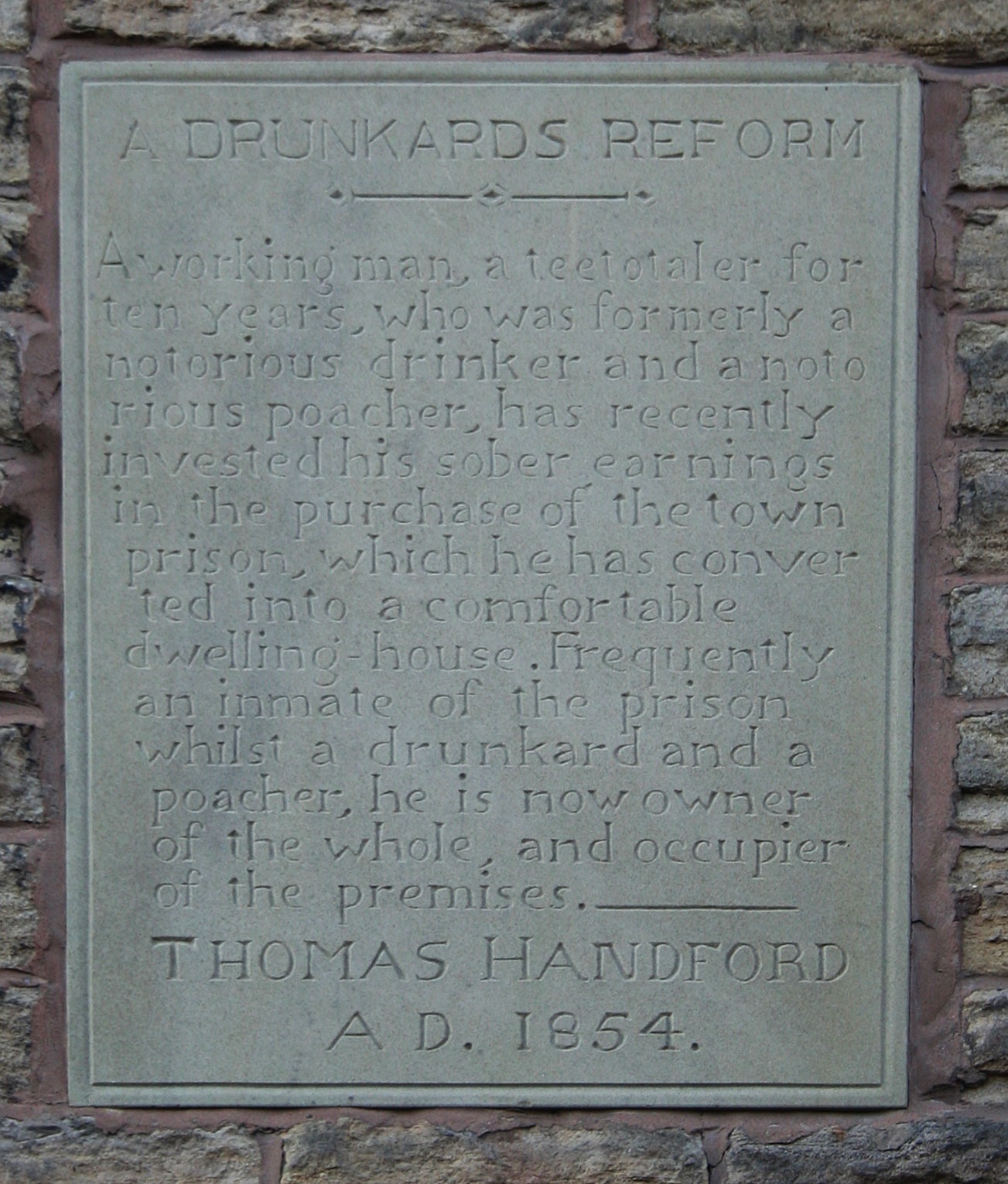
The "Drunkards Reform" plaque

A plaque at the town's former prison tells the story of local man Thomas Handford:

A working man, a teetotaler for ten years, who was formerly a notorious drinker and a notorious poacher has recently invested his sober earnings in the purchase of the town prison which he has converted into a comfortable dwelling house. Frequently an inmate of the prison whilst a drunkard and poacher, he is now owner of the whole and occupier of the premises. Thomas Handford 1854.

== See also ==
- List of mills in Derbyshire
- Listed buildings in New Mills
