= New Mills Urban District =

Former urban district in Derbyshire, England

Coordinates: 53.367°N 2.007°W

New Mills
- Coat of arms

- New Mills UD within Derbyshire in 1970
- Area
  - 1911: 5,204 acres (21.06 km^{2})
  - 1961: 5,244 acres (21.22 km^{2})
- Population
  - 1911: 8,998
  - 1961: 8,514
- History
  - Created: 1894
  - Abolished: 1974
  - Succeeded by: High Peak
- Status: Urban District
- Government: New Mills Urban District Council
  - HQ: New Mills

New Mills was an urban district in Derbyshire, England, from 1894 to 1974. It was created under the Local Government Act 1894. The district was abolished in 1974 under the Local Government Act 1972 and combined with the Buxton and Glossop Municipal Boroughs, the Whaley Bridge Urban District and the Chapel en le Frith and Tintwistle Rural Districts to form the new High Peak district.
