= John Potts (engraver) =

- Born: c. 1791; Manchester, Lancashire, England
- Died: 1841
- Known for: Engraving, Calico printing

John Potts (c. 1791–1841) was the inventor of a method of calico printing by the use of copper rollers onto which patterns had been engraved. He was born in Manchester, he moved to New Mills, Derbyshire in 1820. He founded the firm of engravers to calico printers known as Potts, Oliver and Potts, with his brother William Wainwright Potts, at St. George's Works. John was an artist and engraver, William was more interested in pottery. Some pottery was made and decorated in New Mills in the upper works which was described as a print and pot works as late as 1841. John Potts also did some printing on his own account, focusing his attention on the printing of silk. The William Wainwright Potts eventually moved to Burslem to become a pottery manufacturer.
