= Goyt Way =

10-mile footpath in north-west England

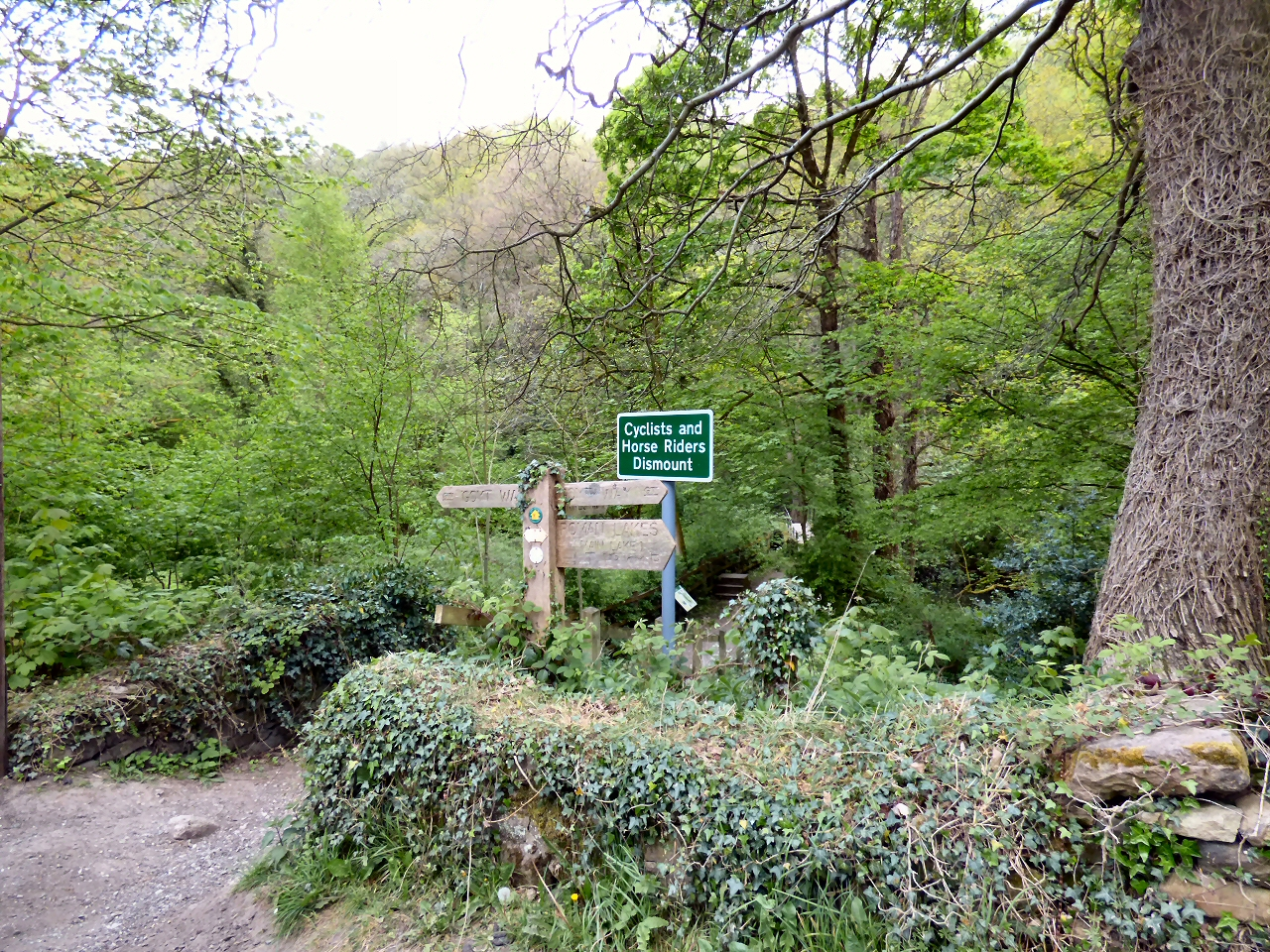
- Goyt Way fingerpost near Strines
- Length: 10 mi (16 km)
- Location: Greater Manchester and Derbyshire, England
- Trailheads: Etherow Country Park; Whaley Bridge
- Use: Hiking
- Highest point: Brookbottom, 200 m (656 ft)
- Lowest point: River Goyt near Compstall, 80 m (262 ft)

The Goyt Way is a 10-mile (16 km) walking route from Etherow Country Park, Greater Manchester, to Whaley Bridge, Derbyshire, following the valley of the River Goyt. It is part of the longer Midshires Way, which in turn is part of the E2 European long-distance path. The path is waymarked, and intersects with the Cheshire Ring Canal Walk and the Peak District Boundary Walk. It passes through the following settlements: Compstall, Marple, Strines, Brookbottom, Hague Bar, New Mills (where it crosses the Millennium Walkway) and Furness Vale. In its latter stages, it follows the towpath of the Peak Forest Canal to its terminus at Whaley Bridge.

== See also ==
- Recreational walks in Cheshire
- Recreational walks in Derbyshire
