= Lantern Pike =

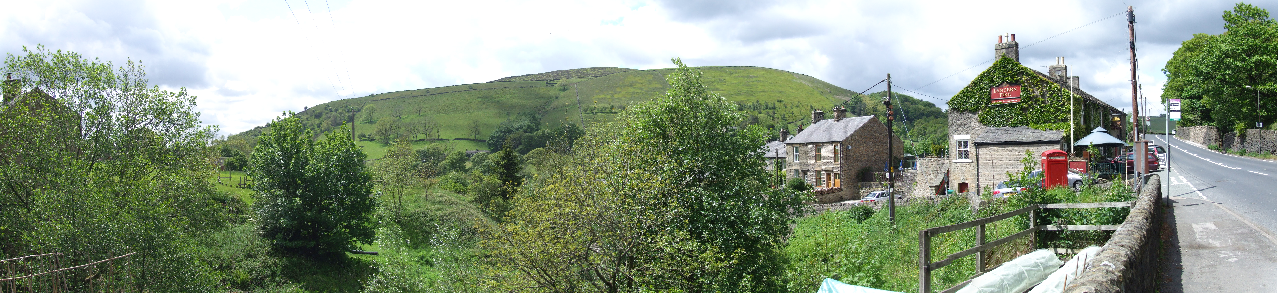

Highest point
- Elevation: 373 m (1,224 ft)
- Prominence: c. 88 m
- Coordinates: 53°23′25″N 1°57′42″W

Geography
- Location within Derbyshire
- Location: Derbyshire, England
- Parent range: Peak District
- OS grid: SK026881

Lantern Pike is a hill near Hayfield, in Derbyshire, England. The land lies within the Peak District National Park and is owned and maintained by the National Trust. It is permanently open to the public. According to Ordnance Survey, it is 373 metres (1,224 ft) in height (measured by air survey).

According to the booklet 10 Walks Around Hayfield, published by the Peak District National Park Authority, the name Lantern Pike probably comes from the hill's use as a beacon.

The hill is a popular hiking destination, and is often considered a continuation of nearby Kinder Scout. The Peak District Boundary Walk runs south to north past the summit and the Pennine Bridleway crosses the eastern flank of the hill.

Lantern Pike gives its name to the Lantern Pike Inn in nearby Little Hayfield.
