= Etherow Country Park =

Park in Greater Manchester, England

Coordinates: 53.420°N 2.038°W

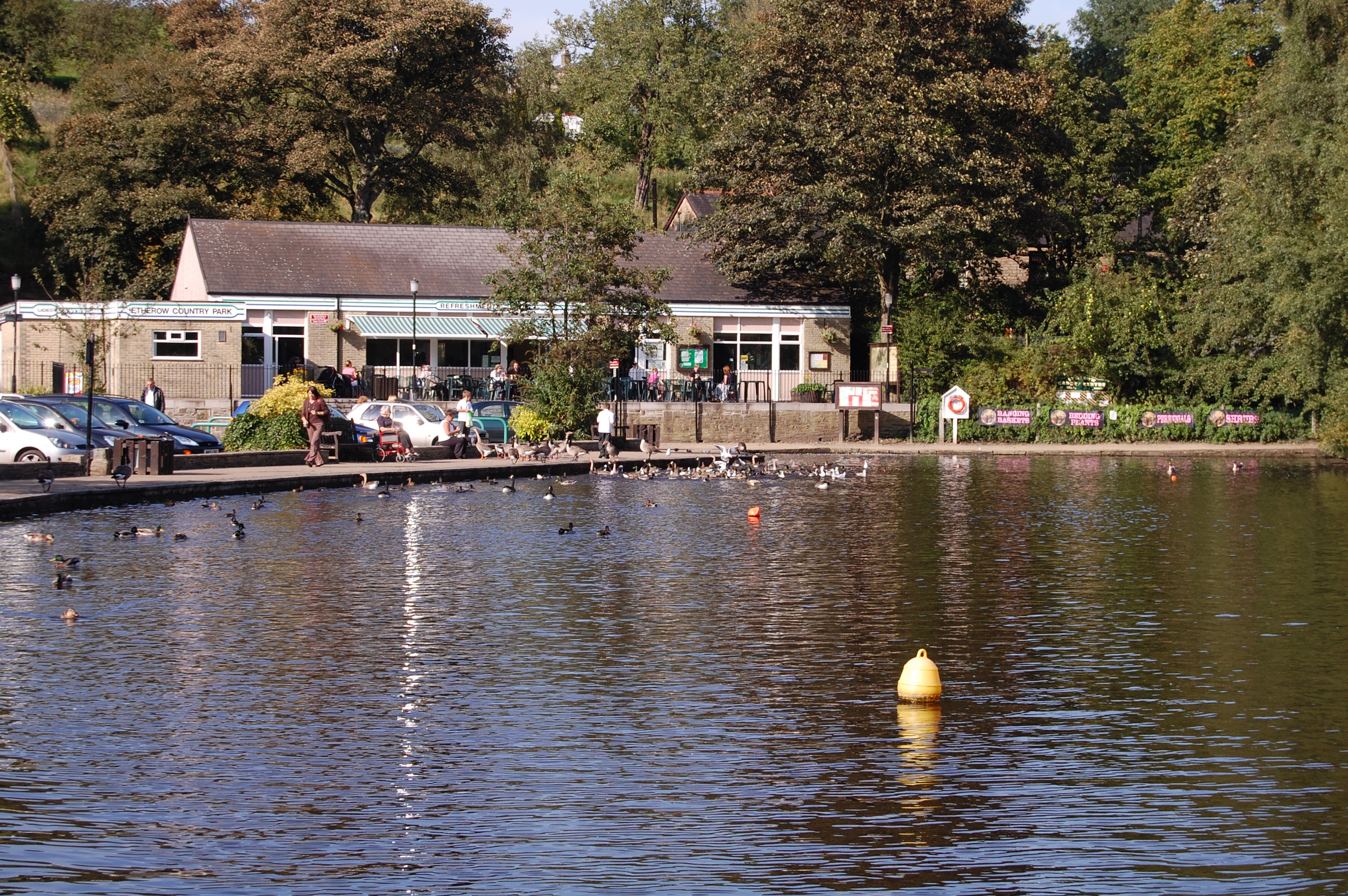
Etherow Café and Visitor Centre as seen from the banks of the Model Boating Pond, 2009

Etherow Country Park is in Compstall, a village between Marple Bridge and Romiley, in the Metropolitan Borough of Stockport, Greater Manchester, England. It is a local nature reserve (LNR) and the starting point of the Goyt Way.

== Description ==
Etherow was one of England's first country parks. Originally it was an industrial area incorporating a mine, a watermill and a mill pond. The River Etherow flows through the park and is the source for the mill pond. With the decline of industry, the mill pond and park have become a nature reserve and a place for people to spend time walking and taking in the peaceful surroundings.

== Reserve ==
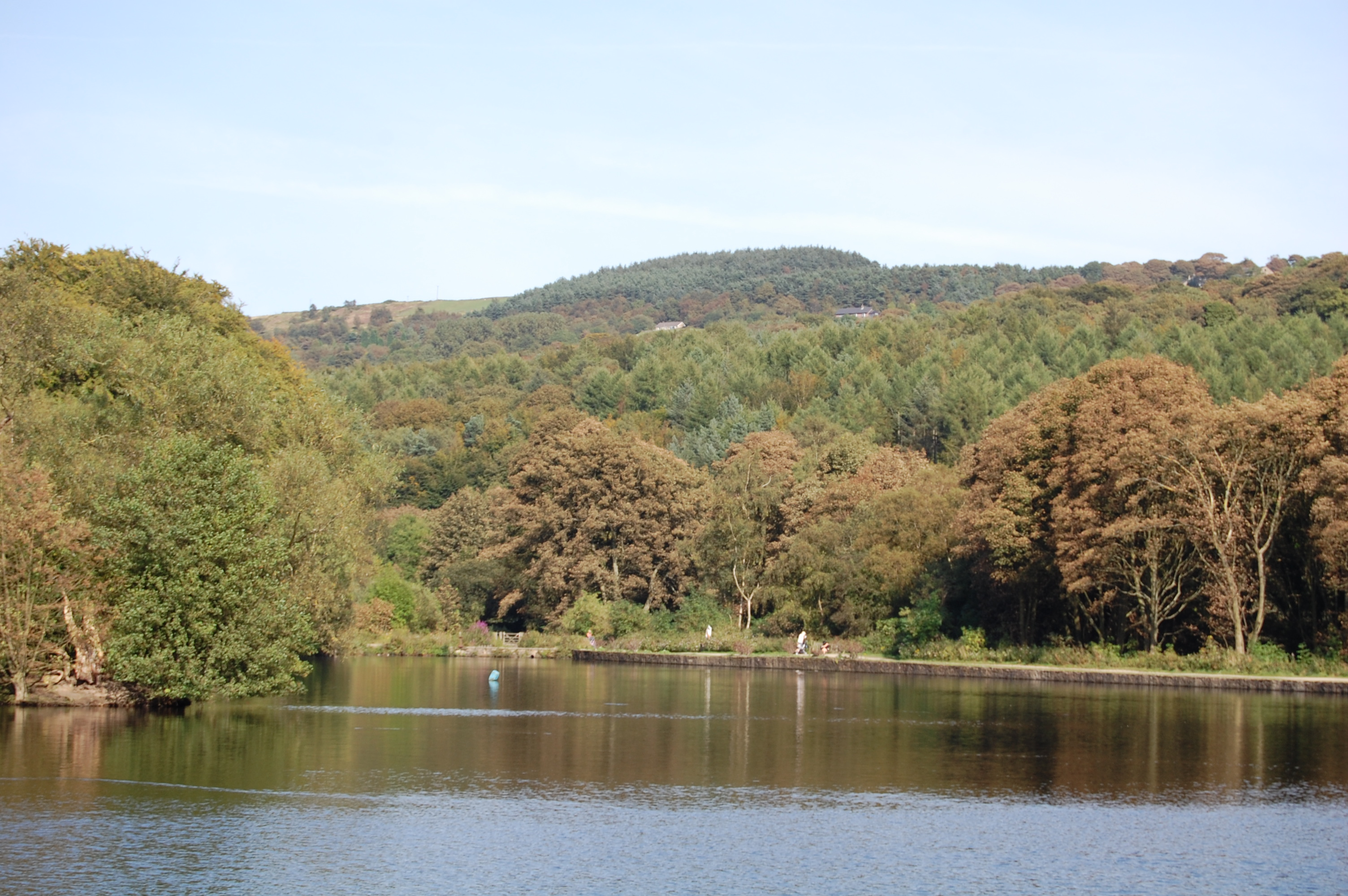
The reservoir as shown in 2009 was built to supply the mill in Compstall, and is fed by the River Etherow

Compstall Nature Reserve is a 12.8-hectare (32-acre) region of the park which was designated a Site of Special Scientific Interest (SSSI) in 1977; this was for its biological interest, especially its wide range of habitats including open water, tall fen, reed swamp, carr and mixed deciduous woodland.

The site is also of considerable ornithological interest with water rail, an uncommon species, having been recorded.

== Community groups and clubs ==
Etherow Country Park has many local groups associated with it:

- Etherow Country Park Sailing Club was founded as Bredbury and Romiley Sailing Club in 1967. In 2014, it finished 17th of 64 entrants in the Southport 24 Hour Race.
- The Friends of Etherow is a small local community group.
- There are also anglers and model boaters clubs.
