= Midshires Way =

Long-distance footpath in England

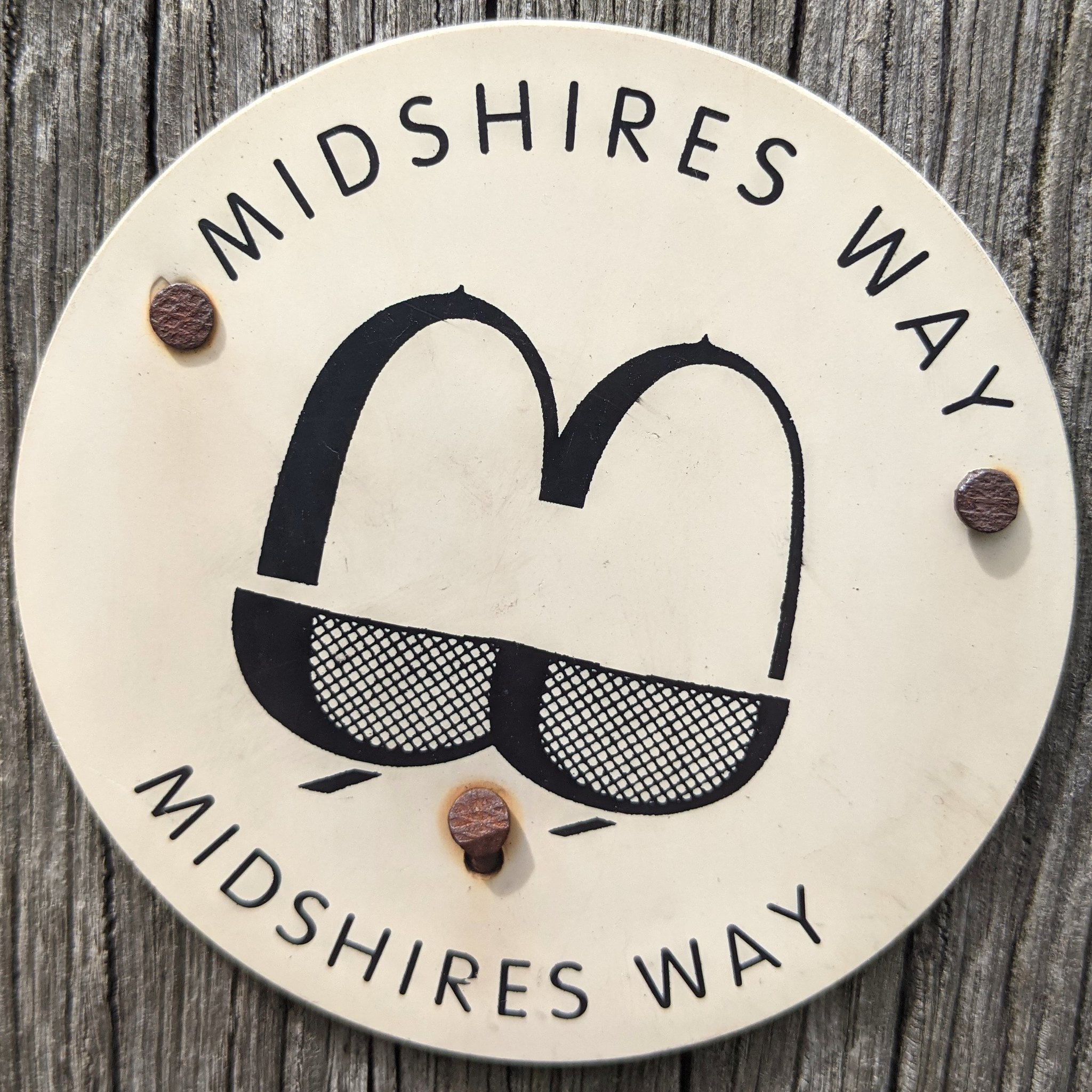
- Trail marker showing the double-acorn emblem of the Midshires Way
- Length: 223.8 miles (360.2 km)
- Location: England
- Established: 1994
- Trailheads: Bledlow; Stockport
- Use: Hiking; Cycling; Horse riding

The Midshires Way is a long-distance footpath and bridleway that runs for 230 miles (370 km) from the Chiltern Hills from near Bledlow in Buckinghamshire, through the Midlands counties of Northamptonshire, Leicestershire, Nottinghamshire and Derbyshire, to Stockport, Greater Manchester. It also links several other long-distance walking routes or trackways including The Ridgeway, the Pennine Bridleway and the Trans Pennine Trail.

The route was opened in 1994 as a collaboration between numerous Local Authorities and user groups. It is intended as a multi-user trail but there are places where the recommended route for walkers differs from the route for horse riders and cyclists.

== Buckinghamshire section ==
The Midshires Way starts from Wain Hill (SP770012), between Bledlow and Chinnor. From there it runs near Princes Risborough north to Waddesdon and on to Winslow then in a northwest direction passing through the town of Milton Keynes. North of the town it passes to the west of Stoke Goldington before crossing the county border into Northamptonshire.

== Northamptonshire section ==
There is a 46-mile (74 km) section in Northamptonshire. Between Northampton and Market Harborough it follows the Brampton Valley Way along the route of a disused railway line, passing through two tunnels. One section within Northampton runs close to the Grand Union Canal at Blisworth Junction in Rothersthorpe, Northampton.

== Leicestershire section ==
It enters Leicestershire just south of Sutton Bassett and heads northwards for 31 miles (50 km), crossing into Nottinghamshire just north of Old Dalby.

== Nottinghamshire section ==
After passing through Willoughby on the Wolds it tracks west, turning north just outside Kegworth before turning north towards Derbyshire.

== Derbyshire section ==
The Derbyshire section starts at Sawley near Long Eaton running to Duffield then linking with the High Peak Trail close to Wirksworth. The route passes through the Peak National Park and on to Buxton. The trail then follows the Goyt Valley towards Stockport.

== Greater Manchester section ==
In the final section it enters Greater Manchester at the Etherow Country Park at Compstall running on to meet the Trans Pennine Trail in the Tame Valley. The trail finishes at Stockport (SJ893903). The section between Whaley Bridge (Derbyshire) and Compstall is separately waymarked and marketed as the Goyt Way.
