= Thornsett =

Hamlet in Derbyshire, England

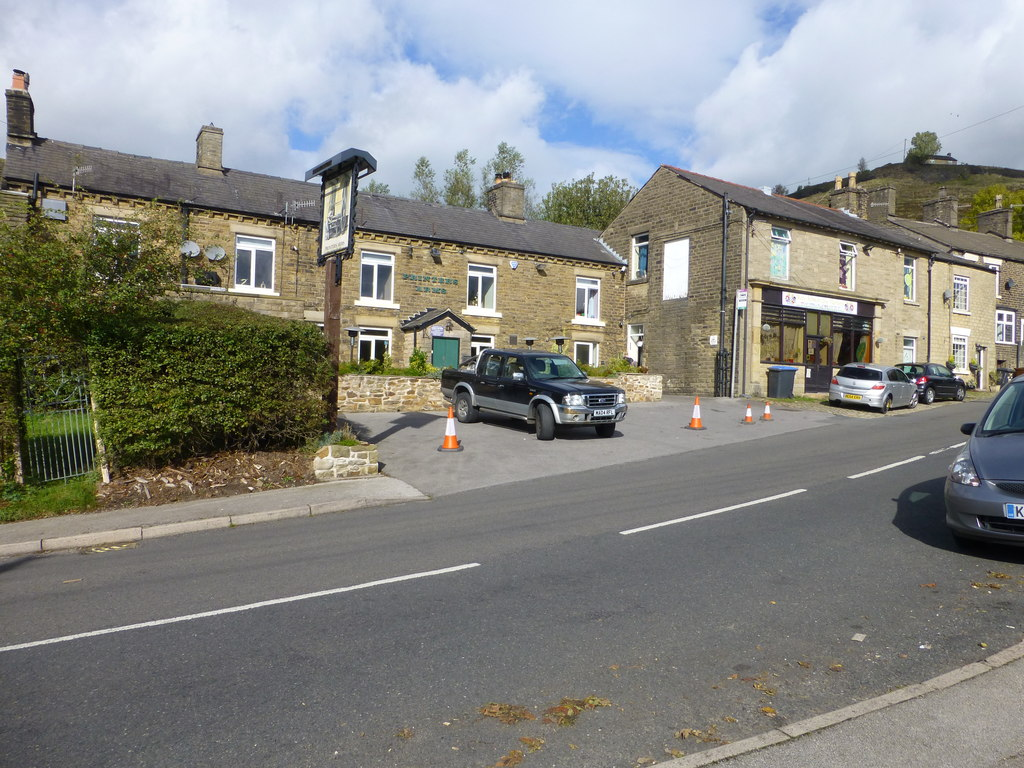
The Printer's Arms

Thornsett is a hamlet within the civil parish of New Mills in Derbyshire. It lies between New Mills and Hayfield, and includes a primary school, a nursery, two pubs, a band room and a cemetery (created in 1993). It is roughly 13 miles (21 km) southeast of central Manchester and 22 miles (35 km) west of Sheffield. The hamlet is governed by High Peak Borough Council and, as it lies within New Mills' parish boundaries, New Mills Town Council.

== History ==
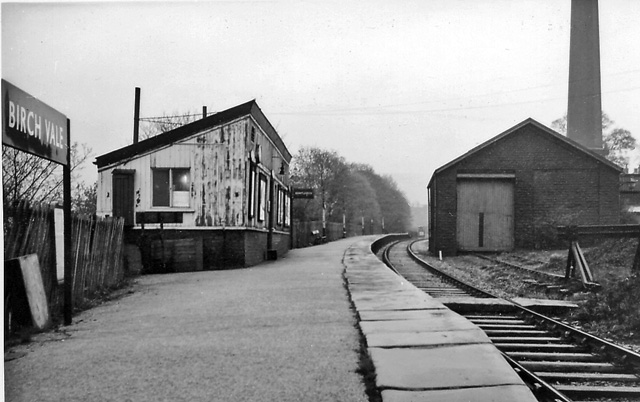
The old Birch Vale Station, on the New Mills–Hayfield line

Thornsett has always been in Derbyshire, unlike some other parts of New Mills. It was originally grouped, along with Beard, Ollersett and Whitle, as one of the ten hamlets that formed the area of Bowden Middlecale. Bowden Middlecale has since been split up, with only these four hamlets forming part of the new township of New Mills.

The hamlet was once served by Birch Vale railway station on a branch line (now the Sett Valley Trail) from New Mills Central to Hayfield Station (now demolished). The line opened in 1868, but passenger numbers declined after the Second World War. Lack of use led to the line's closure in 1970 as part of the Beeching cuts. By 1975, the land occupied by the railway had been sold to Derbyshire County Council.

Birch Vale and Thornsett were served by a post office until its closure in 2008. The nearest post offices are now in Hayfield and New Mills.

There were two chapels in the hamlet, both of which have been converted into houses.

== Geography and transport ==
The hamlet is accessed only by local roads and is connected by road to nearby New Mills, Rowarth, Mellor, Marple and Hayfield.

The only bus route that runs through Thornsett is the High Peak 60, which runs to Hayfield and New Mills.

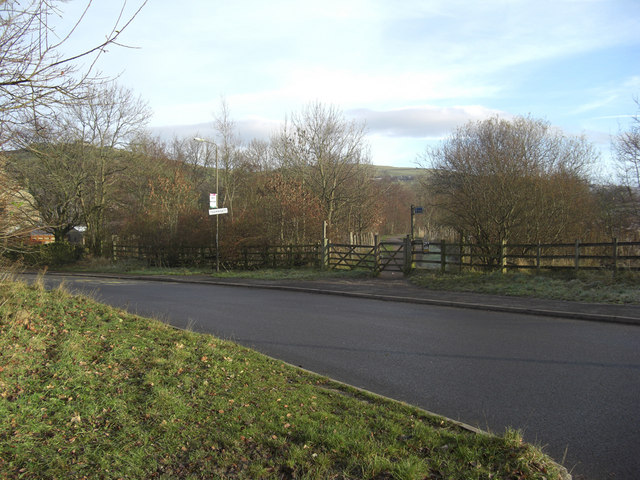
Where the railway line used to run, now the Sett Valley Trail

The nearest stations are New Mills Central and New Mills Newtown, both with services to Manchester and Stockport, also offering services to Buxton, Chesterfield, Sheffield and Preston.

The River Sett runs below the hamlet, flowing from Kinder Scout to The Torrs in New Mills, where it joins the River Goyt.
