= Birch Vale =

Village in Derbyshire, England

Coordinates: 53.378261°N 1.966478°W

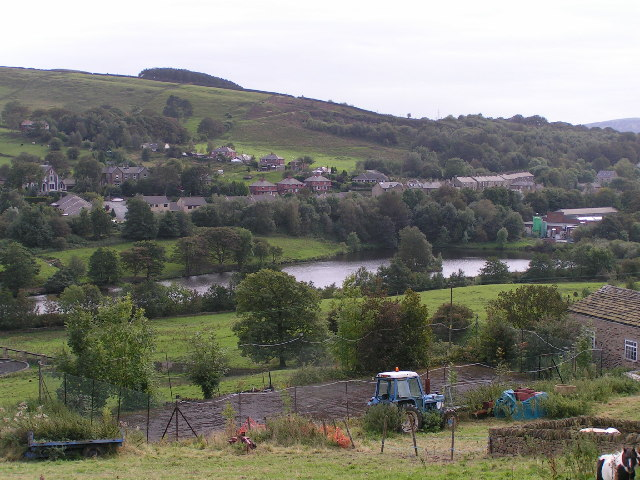
- Birch Vale from Lower Cliff. Looking SSW across the Sett Valley, with the end of Hayfield Wastewater Treatment Works just visible far left. In the centre is Birch Vale Reservoir and, beyond that, the houses of Birch Vale along the A6015.

- Location within Derbyshire
- Population: 2,174 (Note: Note that Sett Ward includes Thornsett, Rowarth and Little Hayfield, as well as Birch Vale.)
- OS grid reference: SK0232786824
- District: High Peak
- Shire county: Derbyshire
- Region: East Midlands
- Country: England
- Sovereign state: United Kingdom
- Post town: HIGH PEAK
- Postcode district: SK22
- Dialling code: 01663
- Police: Derbyshire
- Fire: Derbyshire
- Ambulance: East Midlands
- UK Parliament: High Peak

Birch Vale is a village in the High Peak district of Derbyshire, just outside the boundary of the Peak District National Park, between New Mills and Hayfield. Most of Birch Vale, including the attached hamlet of Thornsett, comes under the administration of New Mills Town Council, though the small part to the east of the former Grouse Inn public house is within the boundaries of Hayfield.

== Amenities ==
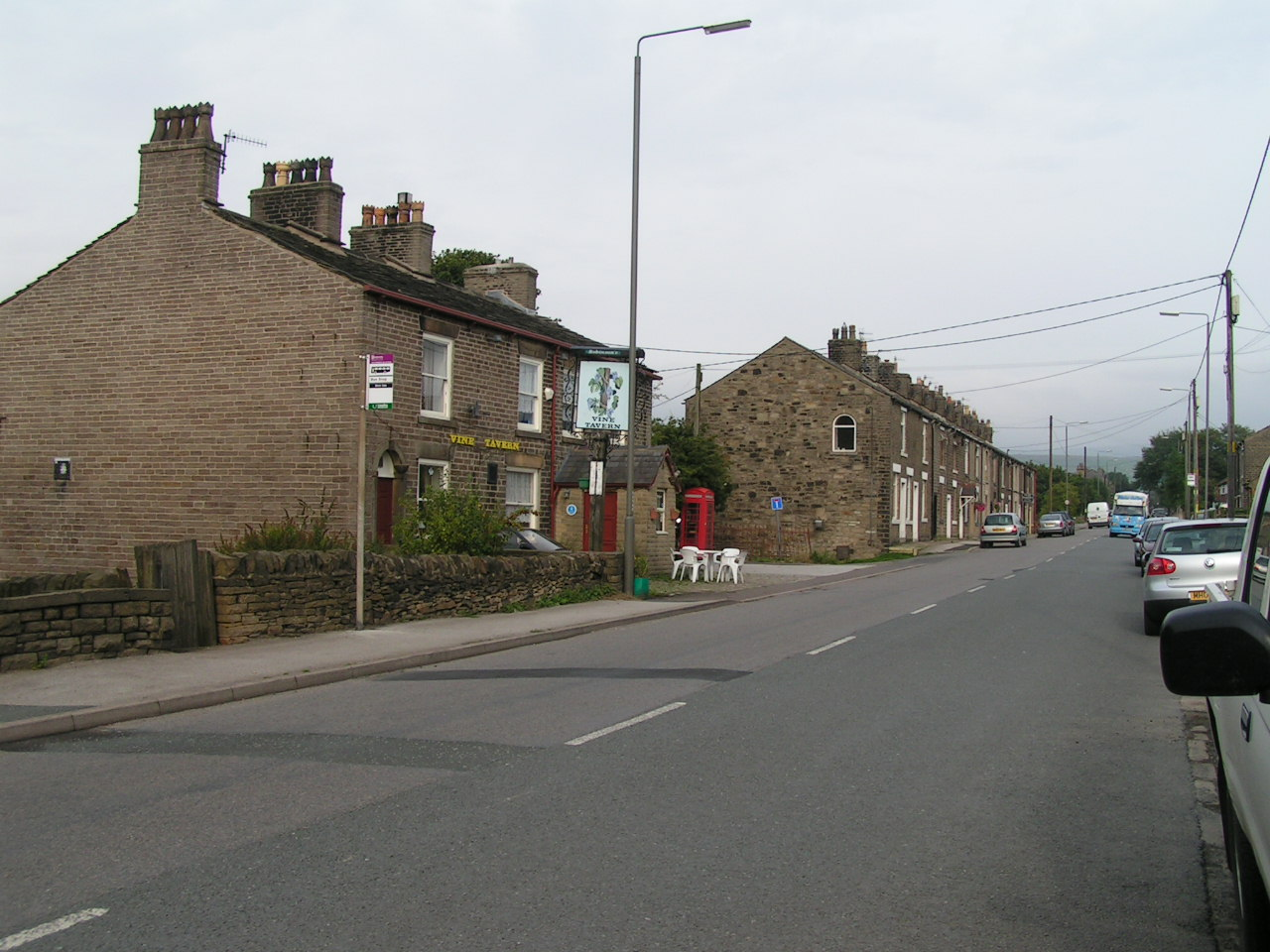
The Vine Tavern, Birch Vale (now closed)

There are no shops, but two surviving public houses: the Sycamore Inn and Printers Arms in Thornsett. Previously, there were three more pubs: the Vine Tavern has closed permanently, the Waltzing Weasel became a B&B in 2013 and the Grouse Inn closed in January 2020.

There is a primary school in Thornsett.

== Transport ==
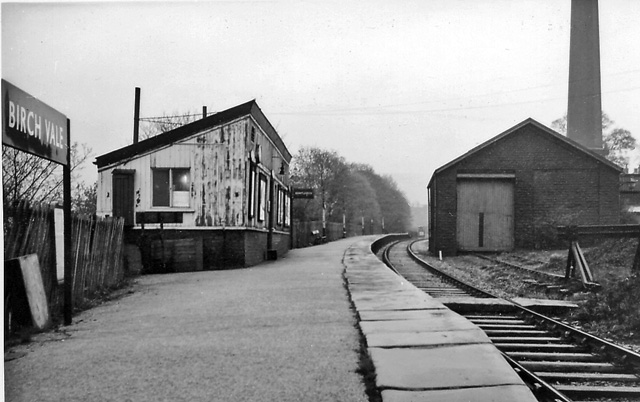
The former Birch Vale railway station in 1965

Until 1970, Birch Vale railway station was an intermediate stop on a branch line from New Mills Central to Hayfield, with through trains to Manchester Piccadilly. Today, the Sett Valley Trail, a shared-use path follows the trackbed of the former railway line.

The nearest railheads are about two miles away:

- New Mills Central, for Northern Trains' services between Manchester Piccadilly and Sheffield
- New Mills Newtown, for Northern Trains services between Manchester Piccadilly and Buxton.

There are frequent bus services to New Mills, Hayfield, Glossop, Buxton and Stockport; routes are operated by High Peak Buses and Stagecoach Manchester.

== Factory fire ==
In the early evening of Friday 2 October 2009, a large explosion was heard by residents as the Stirling Lloyd factory on a local industrial estate caught fire. It took around 16–20 hours to bring the fire under control. Local residents were evacuated shortly after police arrived. New Mills Fire and Rescue Team were among the first on the scene.

== Notable people ==
Birch Vale's most famous daughter is the TV presenter Tess Daly, who grew up here.
