= Birch Vale railway station =

Disused railway station in Derbyshire, England

Birch Vale
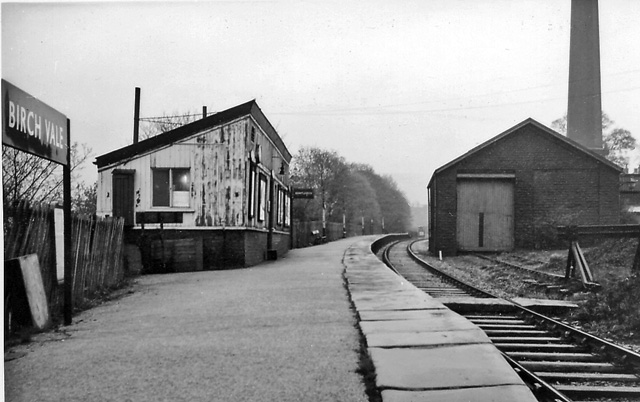
- The station in 1965, looking eastwards towards Hayfield

General information
- Location: Birch Vale, Derbyshire; England
- Coordinates: 53.3789°N 1.9684°W
- Grid reference: SK022869
- Platforms: 1

Other information
- Status: Disused

History
- Original company: Manchester, Sheffield and Lincolnshire Railway
- Pre-grouping: Great Central and Midland Joint Railway
- Post-grouping: Joint LNER/LMS; London Midland Region of British Railways

Key dates
- May 1868: Opened
- 5 January 1970: Closed to passengers
Location

Birch Vale railway station served the village of Birch Vale, High Peak, Derbyshire, England from 1868 to 1970. It was the only intermediate passenger stop on the branch between New Mills Central and Hayfield.

== History ==
The station was opened in May 1868 by the Manchester, Sheffield and Lincolnshire Railway and Midland Railway on a branch line to serve the villages along the valley of the River Sett and the local mills. The line was also popular with hikers.

It closed to passengers, along with the Hayfield branch, on 5 January 1970.

Preceding station	Historical railways	Following station
New Mills Central; Line closed, station open	Manchester, Sheffield and Lincolnshire Railway; Hayfield branch	Hayfield; Line and station closed

== The site today ==
The trackbed of the former branch line has been converted into the Sett Valley Trail, a shared-use path of 2 1/2 miles (4.0 km) in length. No traces of the station are visible.
