= Hayfield, Derbyshire =

Village in Derbyshire, England

Coordinates: 53.38°N 1.94°W

Hayfield
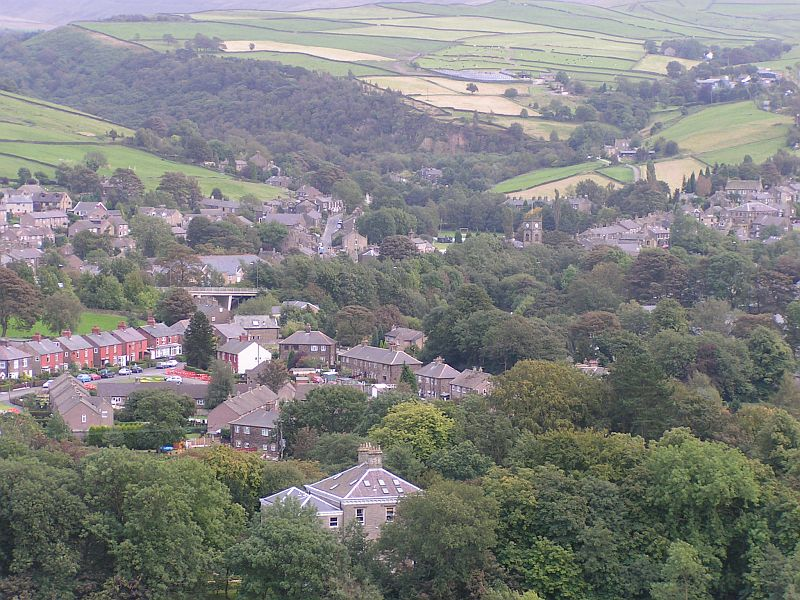
- Hayfield from the north west

- Hayfield parish highlighted within Derbyshire
- Population: 2,709 (parish, 2011)
- OS grid reference: SK 03660 86902
- Civil parish: Hayfield
- District: High Peak
- Shire county: Derbyshire
- Region: East Midlands
- Country: England
- Sovereign state: United Kingdom
- Post town: HIGH PEAK
- Postcode district: SK22
- Dialling code: 01663
- Police: Derbyshire
- Fire: Derbyshire
- Ambulance: East Midlands
- UK Parliament: High Peak

Hayfield (SK037870) is a village and civil parish in High Peak, Derbyshire, England, with a population of around 2,700. The village is 3 miles (4.8 km) east of New Mills, 4.5 miles (7.2 km) south of Glossop and 10 miles (16 km) north of Buxton, in the basin of the River Sett.

The civil parish includes Hayfield village itself, the hamlets of Little Hayfield and part of Birch Vale, and a significant proportion of the Kinder Scout plateau.

== Location and geography ==
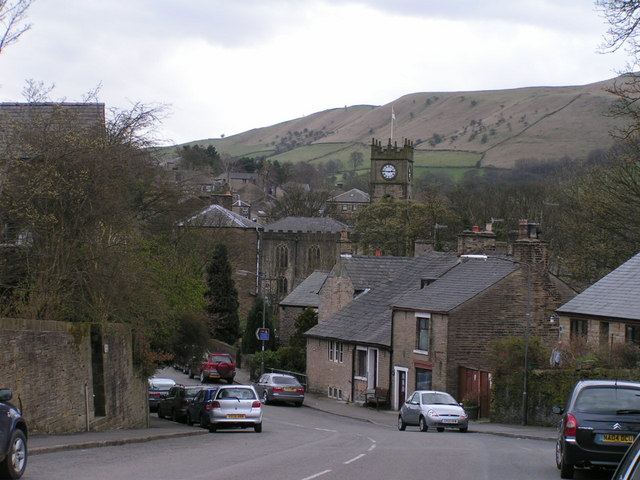
Market Street in Hayfield

The village is in the valley of the River Sett between the towns of Glossop, New Mills and Chapel-en-le-Frith. Anecdotally it is often described as being "at the foot of Kinder Scout". Thirty of the 33 km^{2} of the parish are within the boundaries of the Peak District National Park, including the hamlet of Little Hayfield. However, the village centre itself is not within the national park. The entire area is within the more loosely defined geographical area referred to as the Peak District.

The village is split into roughly two halves, intersected by the A624 relief road (locally referred to as the bypass although it goes through, rather than round, the village). One half contains the traditional village centre, including several shops, businesses, and St Matthew's Parish Church, while the other half contains mostly dwellings along with a handful of businesses, the bus station and St. John's Methodist Church. The relief road was built to ease heavy traffic that once travelled through the narrow main streets of the village.

Northeast of the village lies Kinder Reservoir, within a short distance of the Kinder plateau. This controls the flow of the River Kinder, thereby avoiding the risk of flooding that had previously been a serious problem within Hayfield village, and which necessitated raising the height of the main street.

There are several natural springs within Hayfield village, some of which once supplied part of the village's water. These are no longer in active use, although are 'dressed' yearly in well dressing ceremonies.

Although classed as being in the East Midlands, Hayfield is at the northern extremity of the region and falls more within the influence of Manchester and Stockport in North West England.

== History ==
Some kind of settlement has been in existence in Hayfield since Roman times, and possibly before.

=== Early history ===
The area was once woodland but this was largely cleared, allowing for sheep farming, although the soil was not good enough for arable farming.

The village lies on the line of a Roman road from Buxton (Aqua Arnemetia) to Glossop (Ardotalia). It is also on an important former packhorse route between Cheshire and Yorkshire. The village provided refuge for traders travelling from Castleton and Edale to Marple, Glossop and Stockport.

The village appears in the Domesday Book as "Hedfelt" (some sources state the village was recorded as Hedfeld), and Kinder was recorded separately as Chendre. It was included in the Royal Forest of the Peak in medieval times, but was not a parish until it was created perpetual curacy by Richard II. The forest was popular amongst Norman rulers for hunting, for which it was well noted.

Hayfield's location and nearby geography made it an isolated and practically self-sufficient village until the Industrial Revolution; unlike other areas, Hayfield lacked a feudal lord or stately home, although tithes were paid to the Abbot of Basingwerke in North Wales.

St Matthew's Church, Highgate Hall, Fox Hall (dated 1625) and an adjoining barn are some of the earliest surviving buildings in the village. Fox Hall and Fox Hall Barn are near the bottom of Kinder Road and are visible from the car park of the Royal Hotel.

Until recently there was some dispute as to which was the oldest pub in the village, with both the Bulls Head [sic] (believed to have been established circa 1386) and the George Hotel (believed to have been established circa 1575) vying for the title. However, in 2012 the Bulls Head closed and was converted into a private dwelling.

=== The Industrial Revolution to the present day ===
Eventually woollen manufacturing became a main industry within the village, and the propensity toward three-storied terraced houses within the village reflects this—the top floor, with its better light conditions, was where the loom was operated. In Descriptions of the Country from 30–40 miles Around Manchester (1795), John Aikten wrote: "The inhabitants [of Hayfield] are principally clothiers, though the cotton branch of late has gained a small footing."

As with most northern English villages, the Industrial Revolution brought rapid expansion, chiefly the creation of several cotton mills within Hayfield, along with numerous fabric printing and dyeing businesses, as well as paper manufacture. Hayfield became known for spinning, weaving and calico printing.

Other local industries included stone quarrying and millstone manufacturing. Some quarrying still takes place within the area, and the remains of old quarries can easily be seen within Hayfield and its surroundings. Clog making, charcoal burning and domestic implement manufacture also took place in the village. During the 16th century, Cutler's Green (now a camp site, and formerly the site of Kinder Printworks Mill) was known for cutlery trade, before nearby Sheffield became dominant in that area. Hayfield and surrounding areas were also home to several paper mills.

In 1868 a branch railway line was built linking Hayfield to Manchester. Initially built to carry fuel to power the mills, the railway line also bought passengers to Hayfield. It was estimated that around 5,000 people each weekend would travel from Manchester in 1920–1930, to enjoy the countryside around Kinder Scout. After World War II, traffic slowed and eventually the line closed in January 1970.

A short-lived continuation to the line was built in the early 20th century to convey materials and workmen during the construction of Kinder Reservoir. A famous photograph shows a construction contractor's locomotive crossing Church Street (the main street through the old village centre); the line skirted the cricket field and continued up the Sett Valley, and its course can still be traced in places.

During World War II, the village was home to evacuees from all over the country. However, on 3 July 1942, a stray bomb intended for Manchester was dropped on a row of terraced houses in Watery Hey. Six people died.

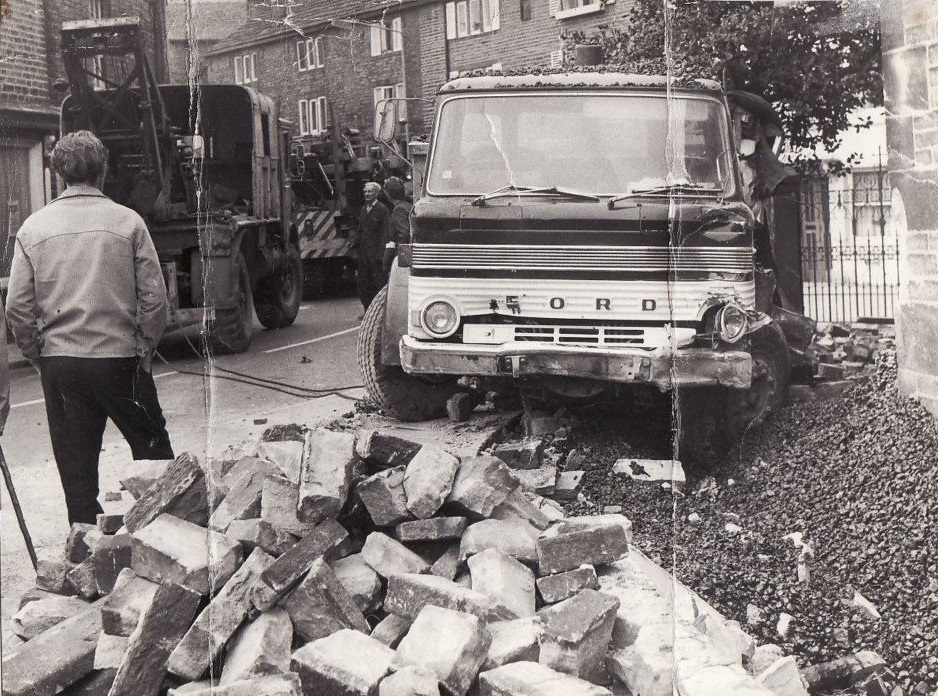
Before the building of the relief road, this lorry narrowly missed the parish church during an accident in 1974.

As late as 1937, the book The King's England: Derbyshire stated that Hayfield "is busy making paper and printing calico". But with industrial decline in the mid-to-late 20th century, Hayfield returned to its original status of a quiet rural village. Whereas once the village had 17 public houses and dozens of small shops, along with a gas works, it now has six pubs and only a handful of shops (there are eight pubs if the parish is taken as a whole). Only one mill is still standing, in the Little Hayfield area, and it has since been converted to luxury flats. Despite this decline, several new housing developments (both local council and private) were built in the village in the latter part of the 20th century, increasing the village's population substantially, and the village remains a popular area in which to live.

From 1939 onwards various schemes were put forward to reduce the amount of traffic passing through the narrow main street of the village, prompted by various accidents over the years (notably a crash in 1969 that killed two villagers and prompted a demonstration). Construction of a relief road through the village began in October 1977 and the road opened in December 1978.

=== Churches in the area ===
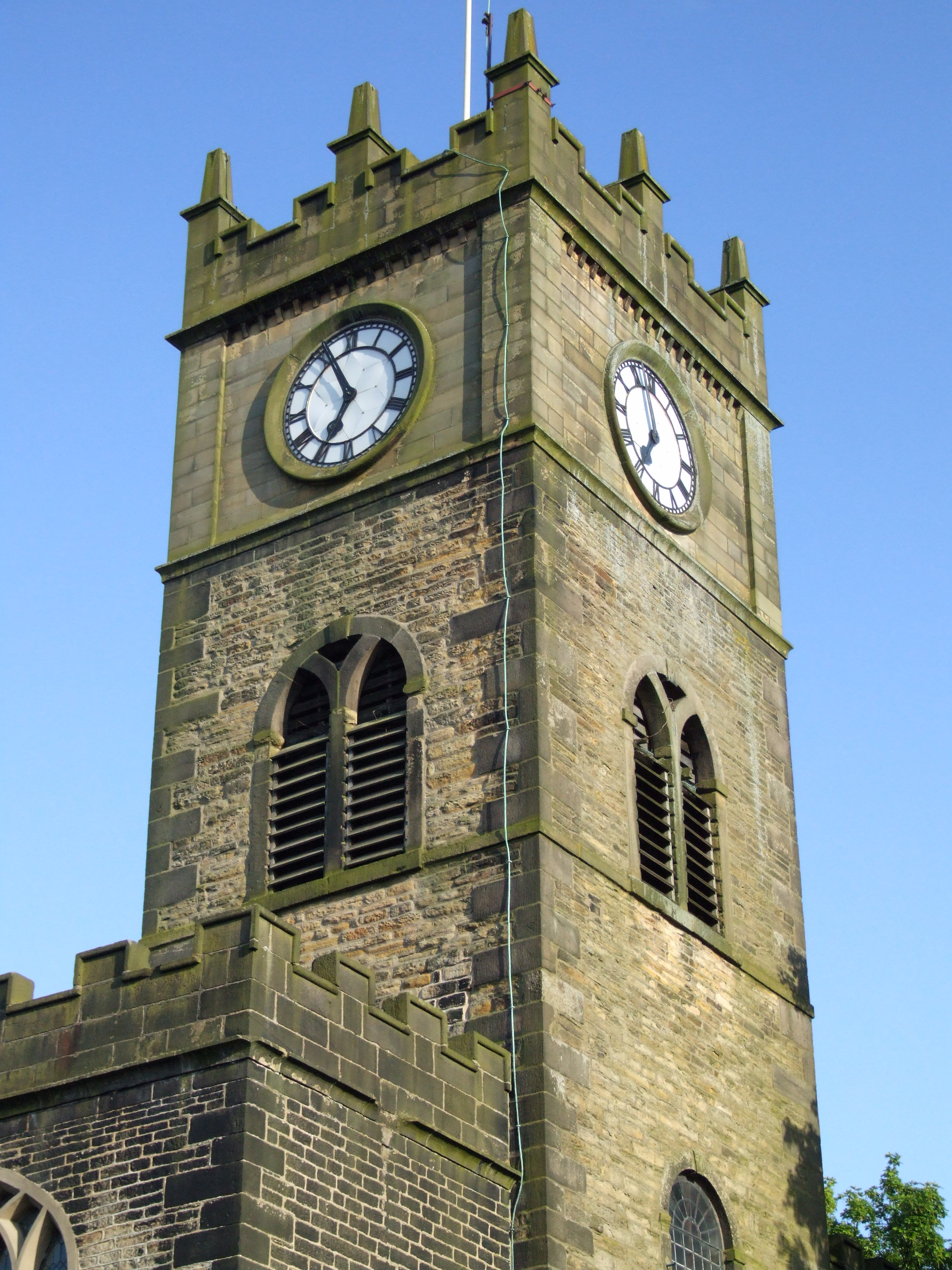
St. Matthew's Parish Church tower

The parish church of St Matthew has existed in its present location since 1386, having previously stood at Kirksteads, the name given to the area where the rivers Kinder and Sett meet near Bowden Bridge. However, the church was not completed until 1405.

The church as seen today is a result of it being largely rebuilt in 1817–18, although remnants of the earlier building are visible in the crypt. The tower was built in 1793 and raised (and a clock added) in 1894. The interior is galleried on three sides and contains a notable monument of 1786 to Joseph Hague, moved there from Glossop church. The church is a Grade II listed building.

St John's Methodist Church dates from 1782. It claims to be the 13th Methodist church built, and was visited by John Wesley, who may well have opened the church personally: Wesley's diaries show he took particular interest in Hayfield, declaring in his diary that he found "uncommon liberty in preaching" when holding a service before the church was built. Although the building has been added to since construction, the four walls of the main church are entirely original. St John's is also Grade II listed.

Methodism was prominent in the area and led to the building of several other chapels. Hugh Bourne Primitive Methodist Chapel was built on Jumble Lane (now Kinder Road) in 1867 and deconsecrated in 1969, its congregation merging into St John's. The building now houses Hayfield Library. Bethel Methodist Church was founded in 1836 and a dedicated church built on Walk Mill in 1867. The church was founded largely to provide Sunday school facilities. It was deconsecrated in 1956. Little Hayfield Primitive Methodist Chapel was built in 1851 and deconsecrated in 1975.

=== The Mass Trespass ===
A mile east of the village is the confluence of the rivers Sett and Kinder at Bowden Bridge (a packhorse bridge), from where rights-of-way lead past Kinder Reservoir (built 1911) and on to the Kinder Scout plateau. The Mass Trespass of Kinder Scout started from Bowden Bridge Quarry in April 1932.

=== Modern Hayfield ===
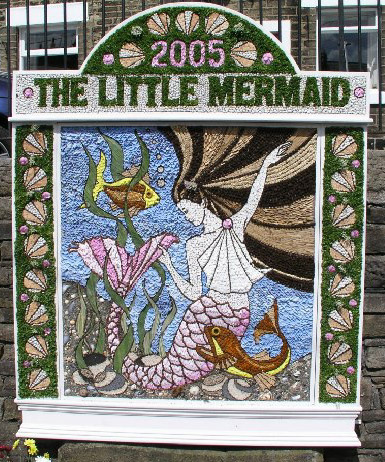
A Well Dressing at the bottom of Kinder Road, Hayfield

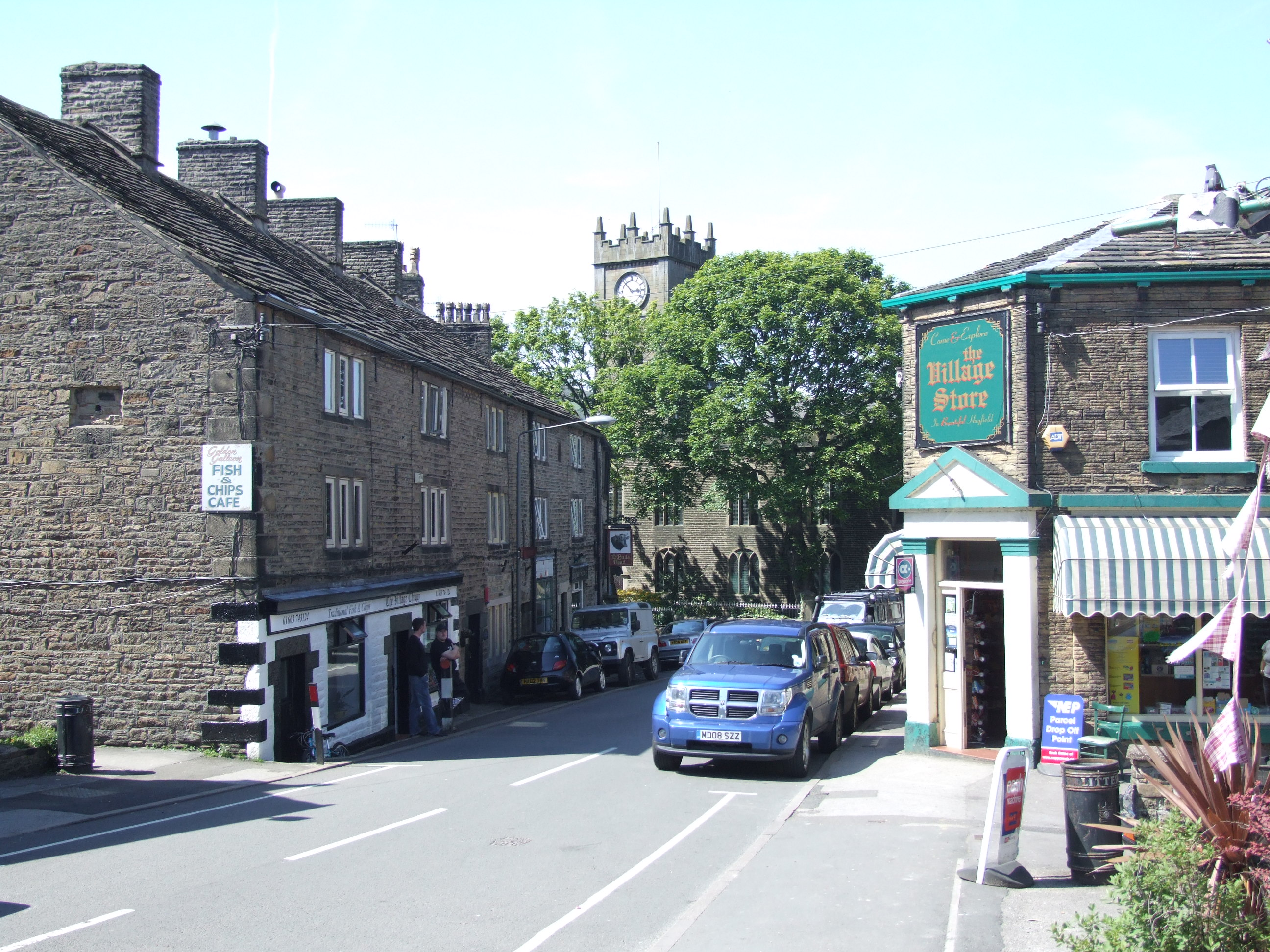
Church Street, Hayfield

Hayfield is no longer an industrial settlement and nowadays is considered a thriving Peak District village with a strong community spirit. In the 2001 census, the parish had 2,852 residents, across 1,205 households (2,164 of those residents living in the village itself). Many residents work outside of Hayfield in nearby Stockport and Manchester, or in neighbouring towns and villages, although there are a handful of local businesses providing employment, including farms.

Hayfield is considered a desirable place to live within the High Peak and this is reflected in higher property prices compared to neighbouring towns and villages. An increasing number of residents have moved from nearby Manchester and Stockport to experience a better quality of life, and it is possible to argue that Hayfield is undergoing gentrification.

An annual May Queen procession is held in the village each year in May, as were sheepdog trials at nearby Little Hayfield, in September, until 2019. Well dressing has recently been introduced. An annual jazz festival was last held in 1989.

In 2012 and 2014 Hayfield was a key filming location for the BBC One drama series The Village.

== Outdoor pursuits and sports ==
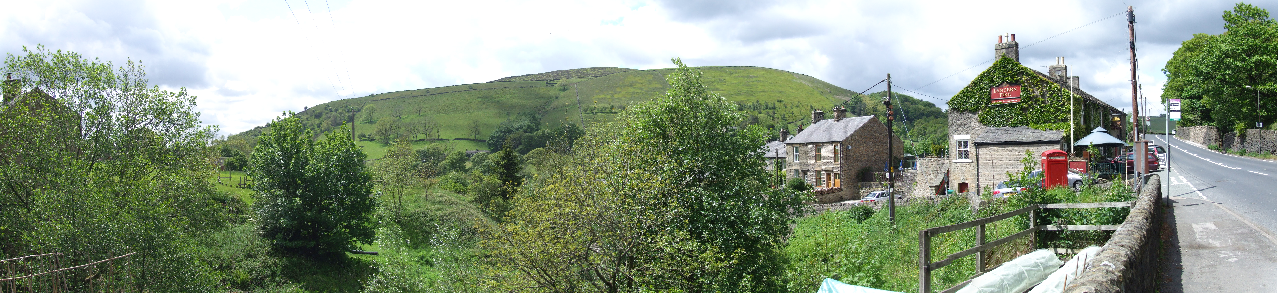
Lantern Pike panorama – move slider

Hayfield is a popular walking and mountain biking centre; as well as being a traditional starting point for the ascent of Kinder Scout (traversed by the Pennine Way), the village lies directly on the Pennine Bridleway long-distance route (part of which follows the Sett Valley Trail). The Peak District Boundary Walk runs through Hayfield on the route of the Pennine Bridleway. The village contains a high number of public rights-of-way, as well as bridleways, a legacy of the pre-industrial days, when they provided the only ways in and out of the area. Hayfield is the home of the Kinder Mountain Rescue Team. Other local destinations for walkers and mountain bikers include Lantern Pike (also accessible from Little Hayfield), a prominent hill to the north west of the village traversed by the Pennine Bridleway.

Fell running is also popular, and each year sees a championship held on nearby peaks.

The village has a cricket field where Hayfield Cricket Club play. The club was founded in 1859 and currently competes in the Derbyshire and Cheshire Cricket League. The ground, next to the Royal Hotel, was purchased by the club in 1976 after famous ex-resident Arthur Lowe helped raise the necessary £5,000.

The village is home to Hayfield Football Club, who play in the Hope Valley Football League.The junior football club participates in the Stockport Metro League.

== Myths and legends ==
On the last day of August 1745, James Clegg – the minister of a Presbyterian church at nearby Chapel-en-le-Frith – wrote to the Glossopdale Chronicle reporting that "hundreds of bodies rose out of the grave in the open air" from the graveyard of St Matthew's Church. They then proceeded to disappear, leaving Dr Clegg to remark: "...what is become of them or in what distant region of this vast system they have since fixed their residence no mortal can tell."

In 1760, Hayfield had its own witch. Suzannah Huggin sold wooden weaving pins and also bewitching charms. An old sailor bought one of these and promptly vanished, although Huggin was subsequently found to be in possession of the charm again. The villagers then blamed her for the disappearance, and she was dragged before the George pub and pelted with rotten fruit and stones, almost killing her. Somebody from Tom Heys' Farm then took the charm but, after a series of disasters — including milk not churning and animals not feeding — the charm was reluctantly exorcised by Reverend Baddeley.

Another local tradition concerns Mermaid's Pool on Kinder Scout. The tradition of a supernatural female inhabitant of the pool is documented from the early nineteenth century. Easter visits were made to the pool in the hope of seeing the mermaid, and some accounts claimed that a sighting would confer immortality.

== Transport ==
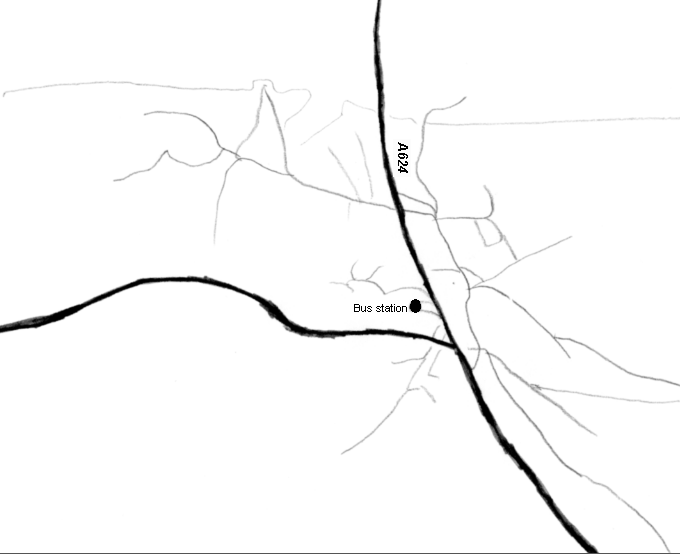
The bus station shown on a map of Hayfield

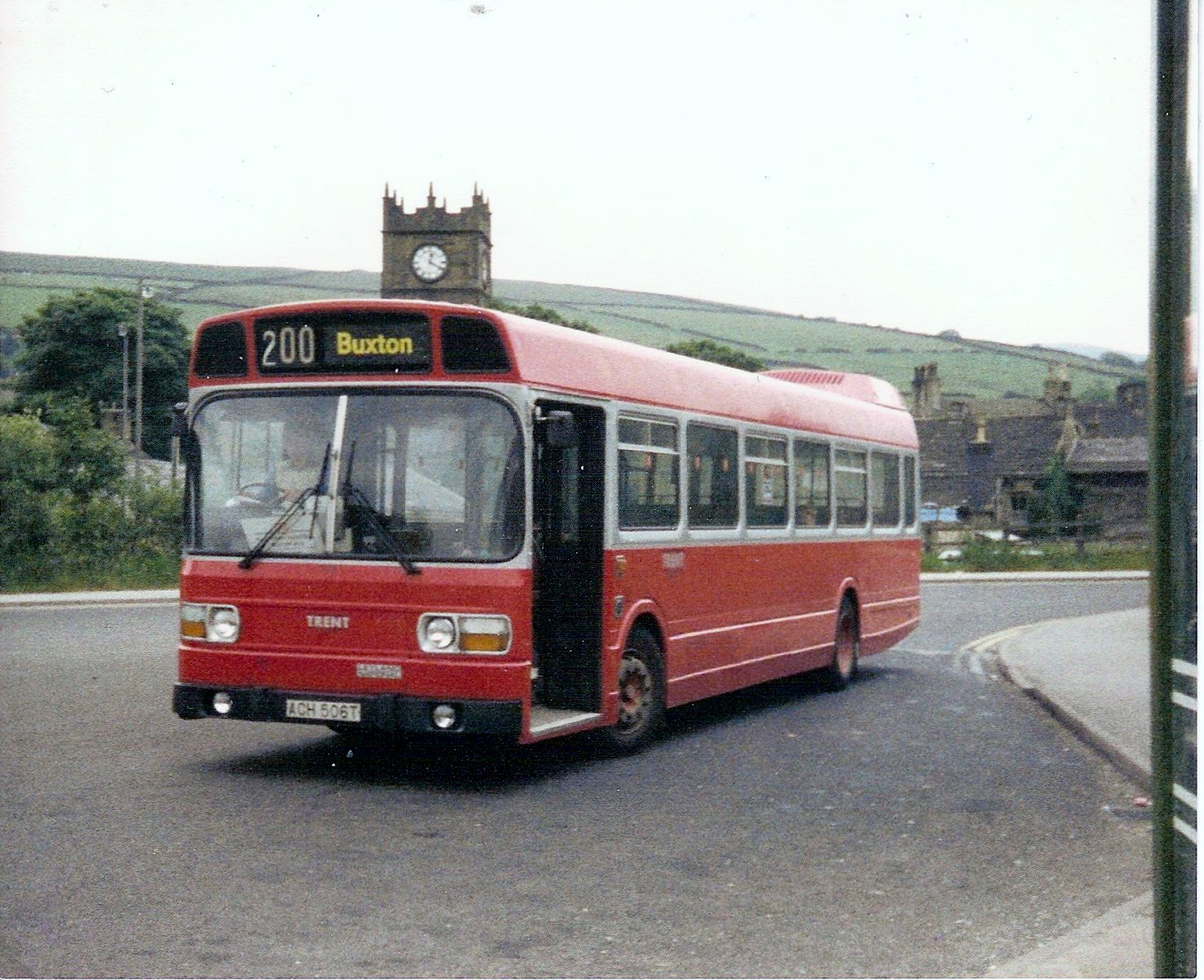
A Trent Leyland National at the bus station in the 1980s

A section of the A624 Chapel-en-le-Frith to Glossop road, built in the 1970s to relieve the village centre, splits the community in two. Originally, the national speed limit applied on this part of the route but traffic is now restricted to 40 mph; a combined toucan/pegasus crossing offers pedestrians, cyclists and horse riders an alternative to the original subway. The A6015 to New Mills makes a junction with the relief road near the village centre; traffic is limited to 30 mph and a zebra crossing also helps reduce to the risk to vulnerable road users.

There is a bus station on the other side of the relief road from the village centre with regular bus services to Glossop, Chapel-en-le-Frith, New Mills, Buxton and Stockport; these are operated by Stagecoach Manchester as part of TfGM's Bee Network, and High Peak.

The nearest railway stations are Chinley and New Mills Central (on the Sheffield-Manchester route); New Mills Newtown (Buxton-Stockport-Manchester); and Glossop (Glossop-Hadfield-Manchester); the last three are accessible from Hayfield by bus.

Until January 1970, there was a railway station in Hayfield, on the site of the current bus station, at the end of a branch line from New Mills Central station.The closure was one of the last of those recommended in 1963 as part of Richard Beeching's rationalisation programme to take place.

Despite often-congested roads in and out of the Manchester conurbation, Hayfield remains a magnet for those who enjoy outdoor pursuits. The old railway trackbed now forms a popular 2.5-mile (4 km) linear recreational route, the Sett Valley Trail. The bus station is at the eastern end of it where many walkers and horse riders visit; there is a car park and toilet.

The nearest major airport is Manchester, which chiefly offers holiday and other leisure flights.

== Notable residents ==
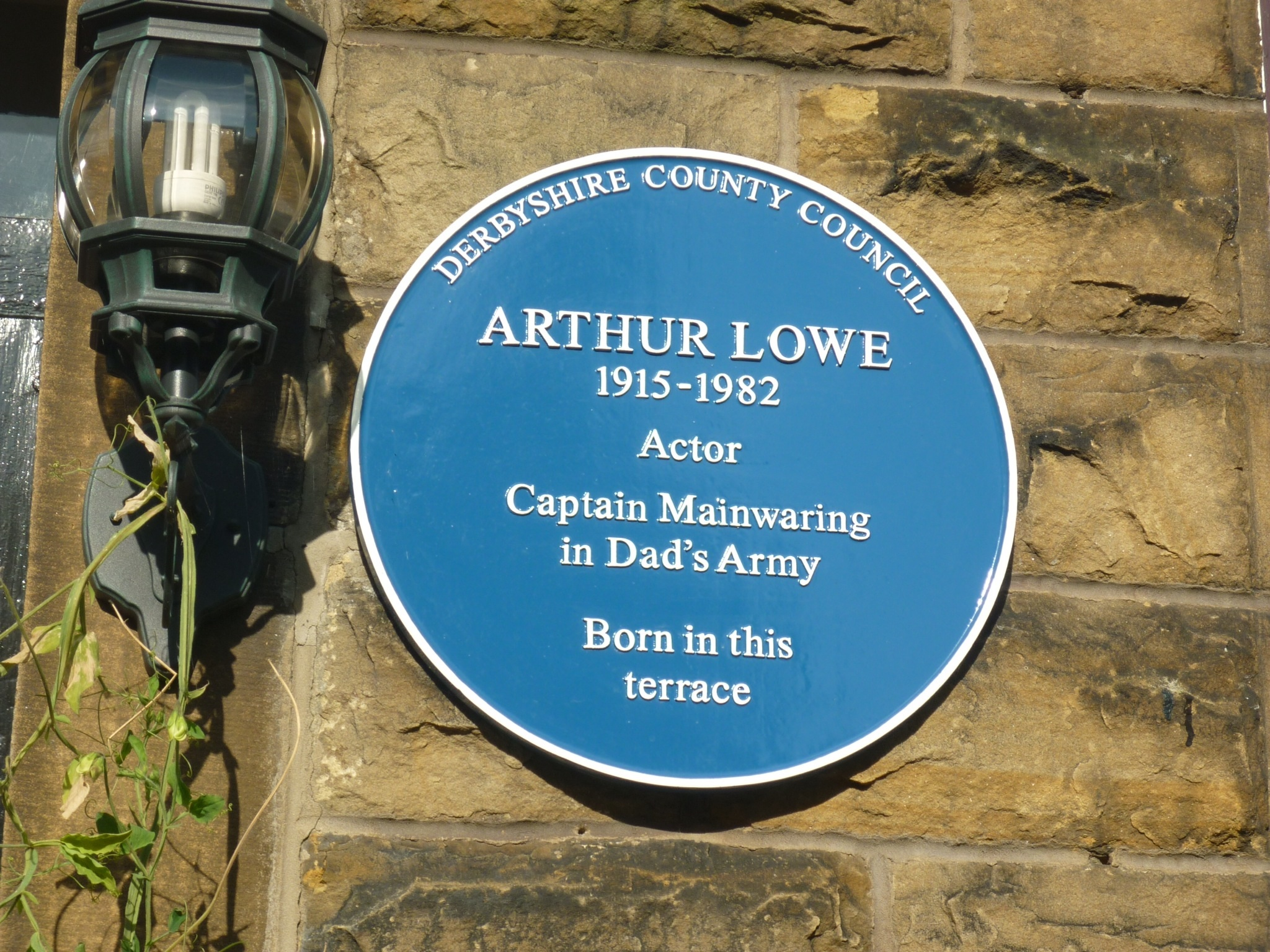
Blue plaque dedicated to Arthur Lowe

- William John Brock (c.1817–1863), an English clergyman, religious writer and poet.
- Arthur Lowe (1915–1982), the actor famed for his role as Captain George Mainwaring in the television show Dad's Army, was born and brought up in Hayfield. A blue plaque was unveiled at his home on Kinder Road. Lowe's wife, the actress Joan Cooper, lived in Hayfield until her death in 1989.
- Pat Phoenix (1923–1986), former Coronation Street actress, also lived in Little Hayfield at the same time as Tony Warren, the Lantern Pike Inn also displays her memorabilia.
- Ernst Walder (1926–2021), former Coronation Street actor, lived in Little Hayfield with Tony Warren.
- Tony Warren (1936–2016), creator and script-writer of Coronation Street; stayed in nearby Little Hayfield where he is connected with the Lantern Pike Inn, which contains some Coronation Street memorabilia.

=== Sport ===
- Frank Thorpe (1879–1928), footballer, played 245 games mainly for Bury with whom he won the 1903 FA Cup Final, was born in Hayfield.
- Rob Hayles (born 1973), sprint cyclist, silver medallist at the 2000 Summer Olympics
- Vicky Horner (born 1976), former Olympic swimmer. Horner and Hayles are married.

== See also ==
- Listed buildings in Hayfield, Derbyshire
