= Sett Valley Trail =

Rail trail in Derbyshire, England

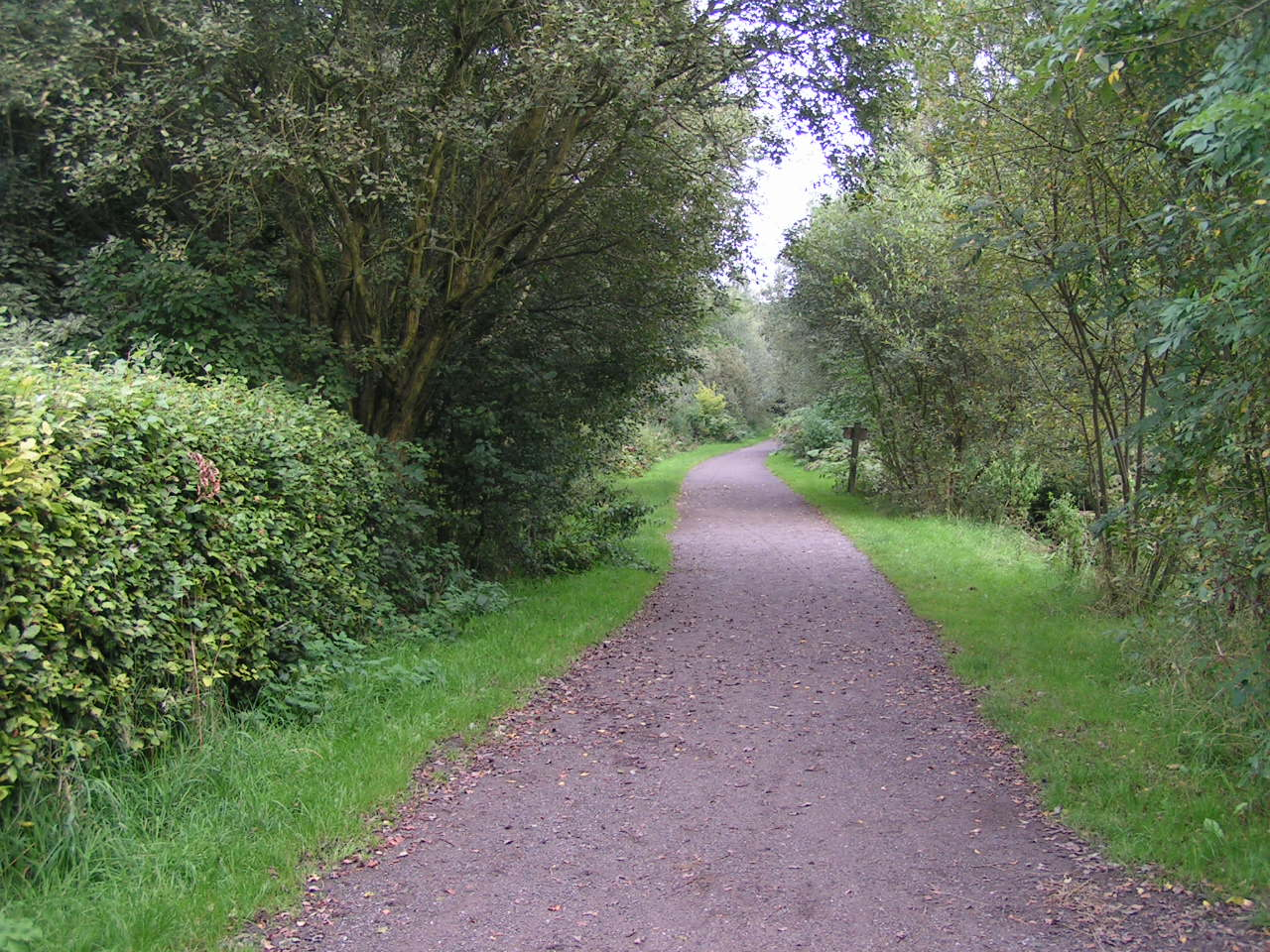
- Length: 2.5 mi (4.0 km)
- Location: Derbyshire
- Trailheads: Hayfield; New Mills
- Use: Hiking, mountain biking, horse riding

The Sett Valley Trail is a 2.5-mile (4.0 km) shared-use path in Derbyshire, England, linking the village of Hayfield and the town of New Mills, via Birch Vale, Thornsett and Ollersett. It runs along the lower valley of the River Sett on the route of a former railway line.

== History ==
The path follows the trackbed of the former branch railway line from New Mills Central to Hayfield, via Birch Vale, which opened in 1868 and closed in 1970.

The line was purchased from British Rail by Derbyshire County Council in 1973 and the station buildings at Hayfield were demolished in 1975. The Sett Valley Trail was opened in 1979.

== The path today ==

An information centre, picnic area, car park and toilets have now been built on the former Hayfield station site. The Pennine Bridleway and Peak District Boundary Walk follow the section of the trail between Hayfield and Birch Vale.
