= List of rivers in the Peak District =

The Peak District, located in central England in the United Kingdom, is the source of numerous rivers which flow into the Irish Sea or the North Sea.

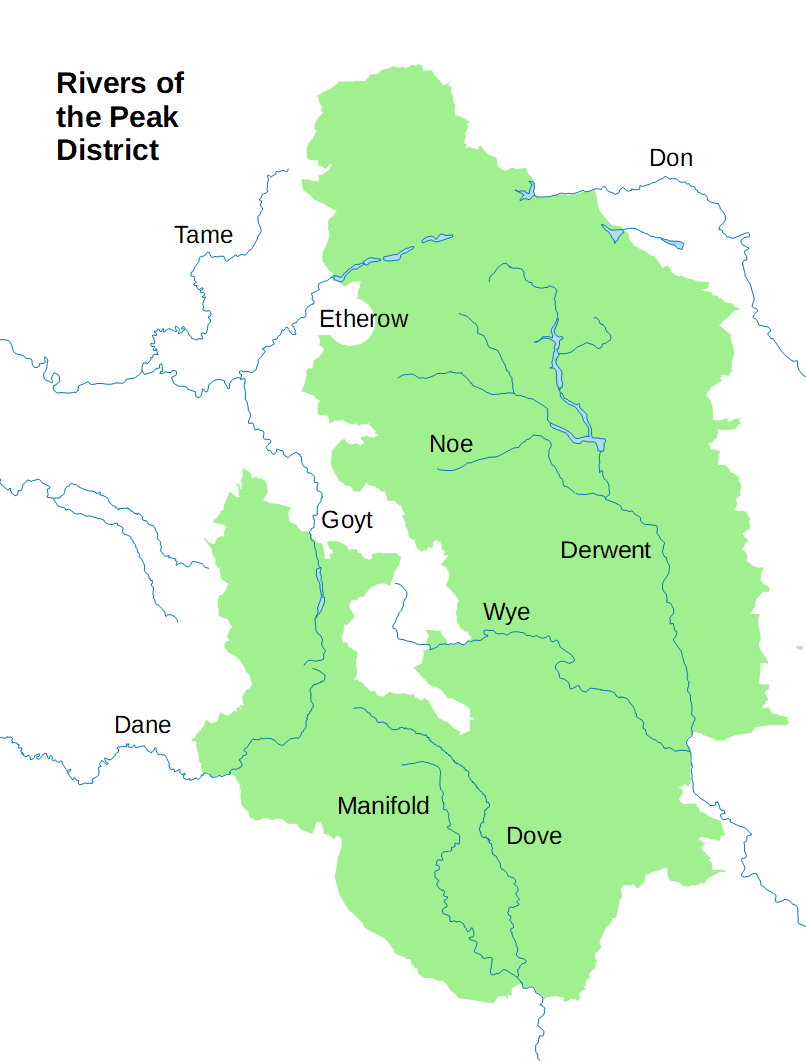
Major rivers of the Peak District (National Park shaded green)

Name	Length	Source	Mouth	Photo
River Alport	9 km (5.6 mi)	Bleaklow	Confluence with River Ashop	
River Ashop	10 km (6.2 mi)	Mill Hill	Ladybower Reservoir	
River Bradford	7 km (4.3 mi)	Gratton Moor	Confluence with River Lathkill	
River Dane	87 km (54 mi)	Axe Edge Moor	Confluence with River Weaver	
River Derwent	80 km (50 mi)	Bleaklow	Derwent Mouth, River Trent	
River Dove	72 km (45 mi)	Axe Edge Moor	Confluence with the River Trent at Newton Solney	
River Etherow	30 km (19 mi)	Featherbed Moss, South Yorkshire	Confluence with River Goyt	
River Goyt	49 km (30 mi)	Axe Edge Moor	Confluence with River Mersey	
River Kinder	5 km (3.1 mi)	Kinder Scout	Confluence with River Sett	
River Lathkill	10.5 km (6.5 mi)	Lathkill Head near Monyash	Confluence with River Wye near Rowsley	
River Manifold	19 km (12 mi)	Axe Edge Moor	Confluence with River Dove	
River Noe	19 km (12 mi)	Edale Head, Kinder Scout	Confluence with River Derwent at Bamford	
River Sett	17 km (11 mi)	Kinder Scout	Confluence with River Goyt at New Mills	
River Wye	24 km (15 mi)	Axe Edge Moor	Confluence with River Derwent near Rowsley	

== See also ==
- List of reservoirs in the Peak District
- List of rivers of England
