= Todd Brook =

River in Cheshire and Derbyshire, England

Coordinates: 53°19′35″N 1°59′16″W

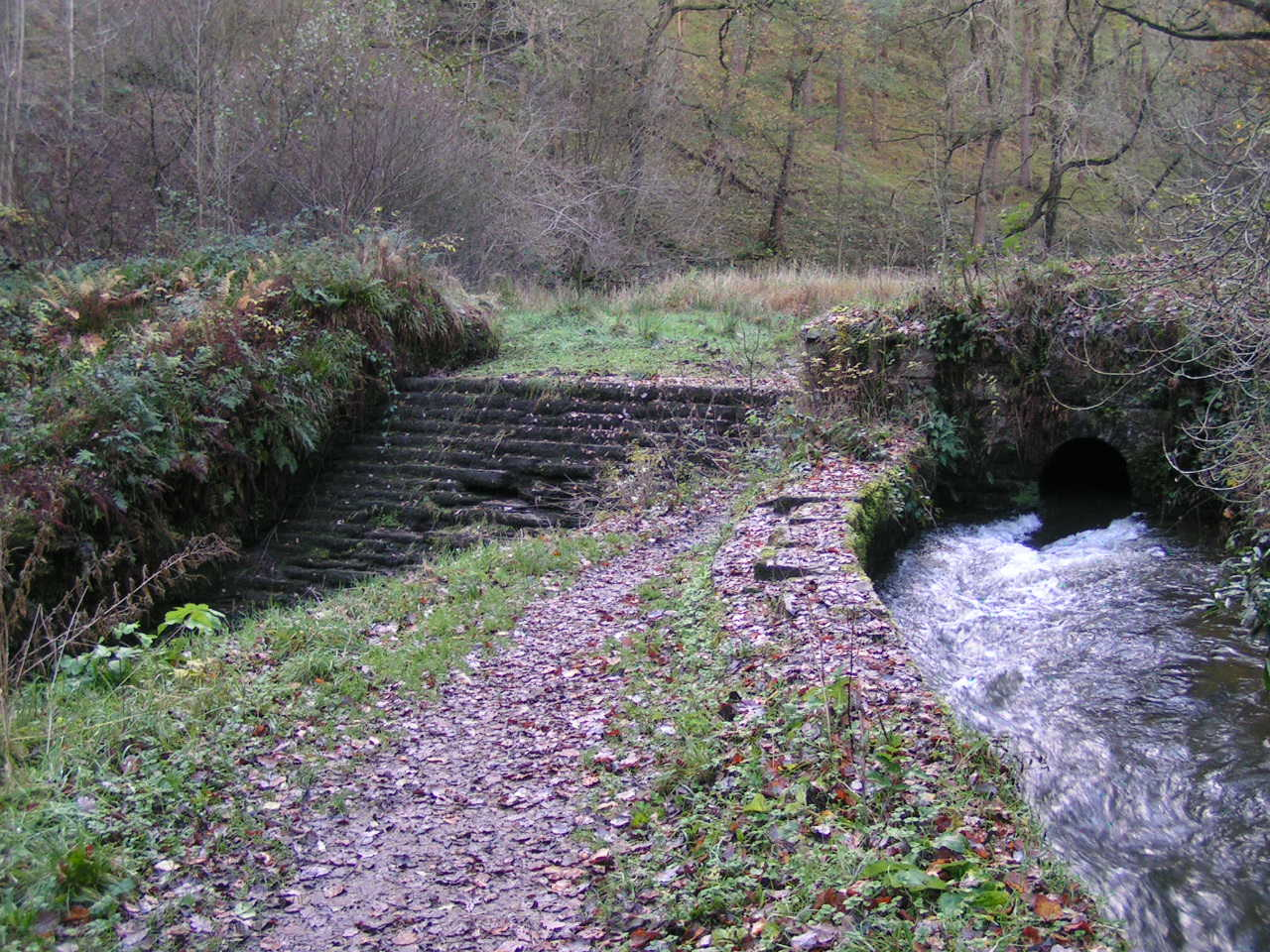
- Todd Brook. At this point above Toddbrook Reservoir, water from Todd Brook flows either through a sluice into a conduit (right) or over a weir (left) and into the Reservoir.

Location
- Country: England

Physical characteristics
- Source
  - location: Shining Tor
  - elevation: 559 metres (1,834 ft)
- Mouth
  - location: River Goyt
  - elevation: 170 metres (560 ft)
- Length: 12.701 km (7.892 mi)
- Basin size: 17.401 km^{2} (6.719 sq mi)

Todd Brook is a small river running through the English counties of Cheshire and Derbyshire.

The Brook rises beneath Shining Tor on the border between the two counties and flows northwards through east Cheshire, passing by Jenkin Chapel, Windgather Rocks and Kettleshulme before turning east, forming the border between Cheshire and Derbyshire for a short distance before filling Toddbrook Reservoir in Derbyshire.

The brook flows into the River Goyt at Whaley Bridge.

The brook's Environment Agency pollution classification changed from good to moderate in 2014.
