= William John Brock =

William John Brock (c.1817–1863) was an English clergyman, religious writer, and poet.

== Life ==
Born around 1817, Brock married around 1845. After receiving his B.A., Brock took holy orders and entered the Anglican Church as curate of St. George's, Barnsley, Yorkshire. He left Barnsley in 1858 to become the incumbent of Hayfield, Derbyshire.

Brock died at Hayfield on 27 April 1863, and was buried there.

== Works ==
In 1847 Brock published a small volume of poems, Wayside Verses, dating the preface "London, 22 September". In 1855 he published at Barnsley, by subscription, Twenty-seven Sermons. In 1858, Brock published a second edition, dating it "Hayfield Parsonage, 22 September 1858". This edition contained his farewell sermon from Barnsley.

After Brock's death, The Rough Wind stayed, a volume of The Library of Excellent Literature, was published in 1867, and The Bright Light in the Clouds in 1870.
