= Ollersett =

Area in New Mills, Derbyshire, England

Coordinates: 53.369°N 1.991°W

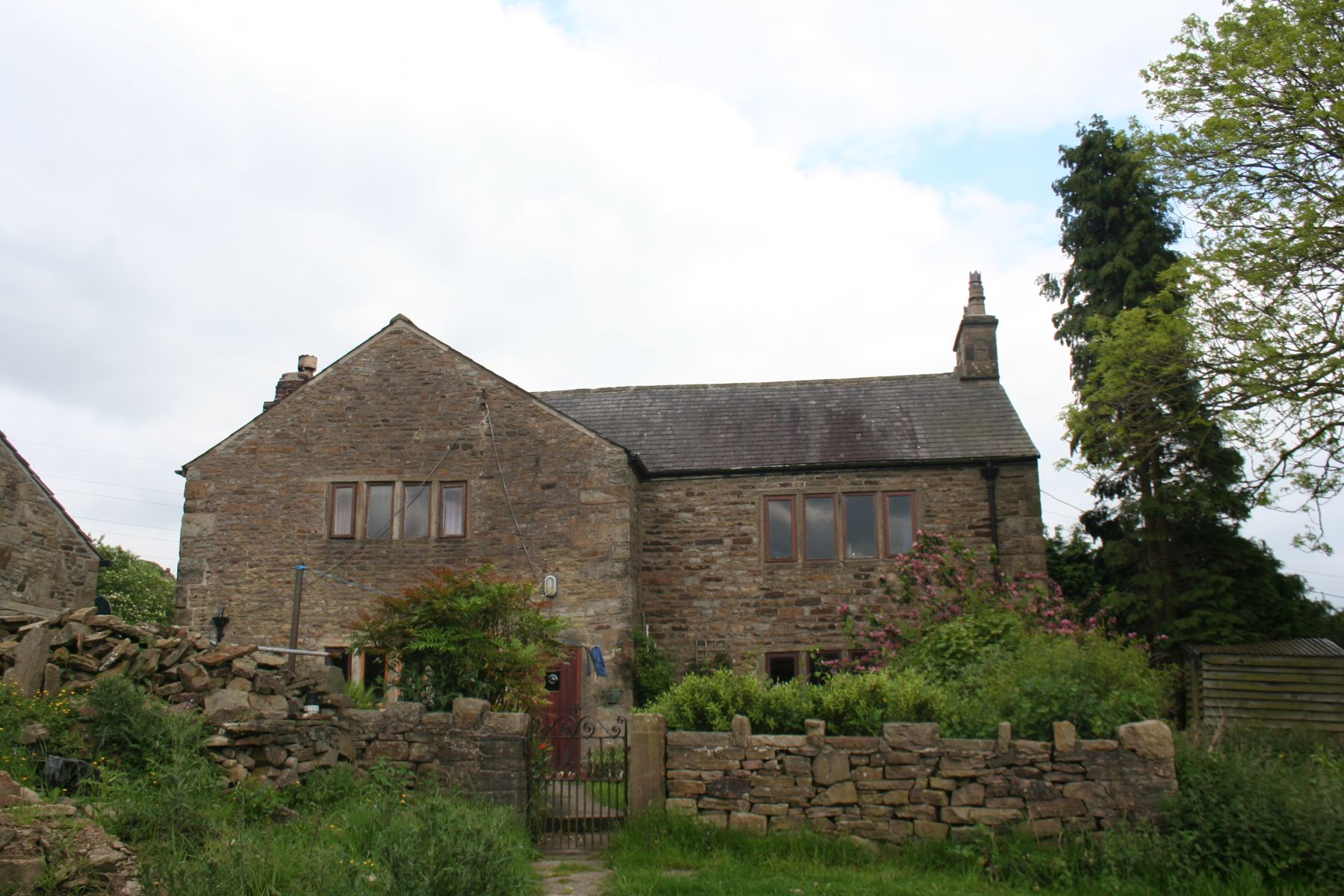
Ollersett Farm

Ollersett is an area of New Mills, Derbyshire, England, about 0.5 miles (0.80 km) northeast of the town centre, between St. George's Road and High Hill Road. It is about 1,650 feet (500 m) long with about 100 houses, mostly built in the late 1940s.

== Ollersett Field ==
Ollersett Field is a small field to the north of Ollersett with an area of around 17,760 sq ft (1,650 m^{2}). It was the location of the 2006 New Mills carnival fair. There are plans for it to be turned into a football pitch for New Mills AFC. To one side of the field runs the Sett Valley Trail.

== Ollersett Allotments ==
Ollersett Allotments are a set of allotments at one end of Ollersett Field owned by New Mills Town Council, and managed by New Mills Allotment and Gardening Society. They are rented out for £25 per year and postcards are available for 25p at New Mills Heritage Centre.
