= River Goyt =

River in North West England

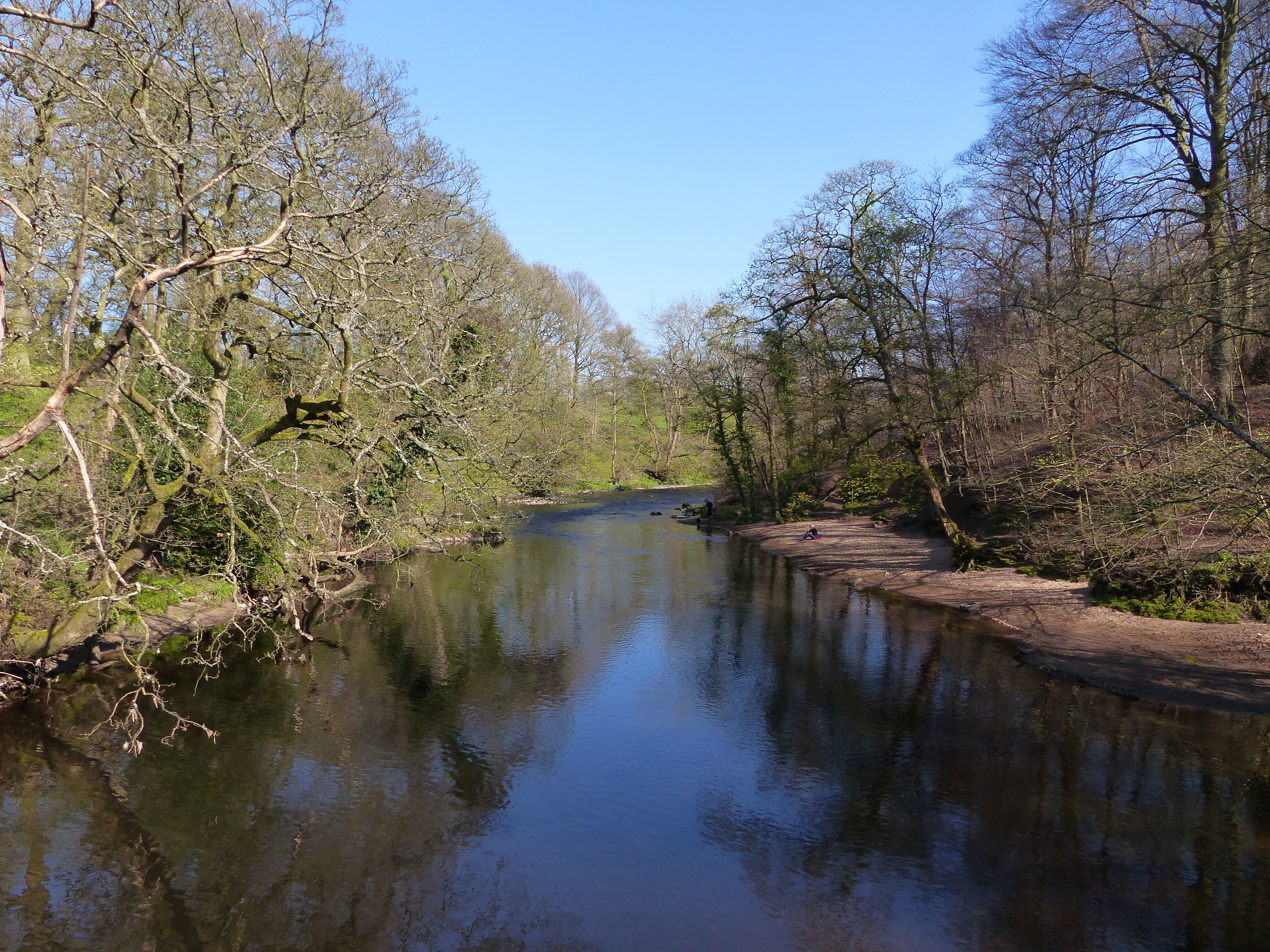

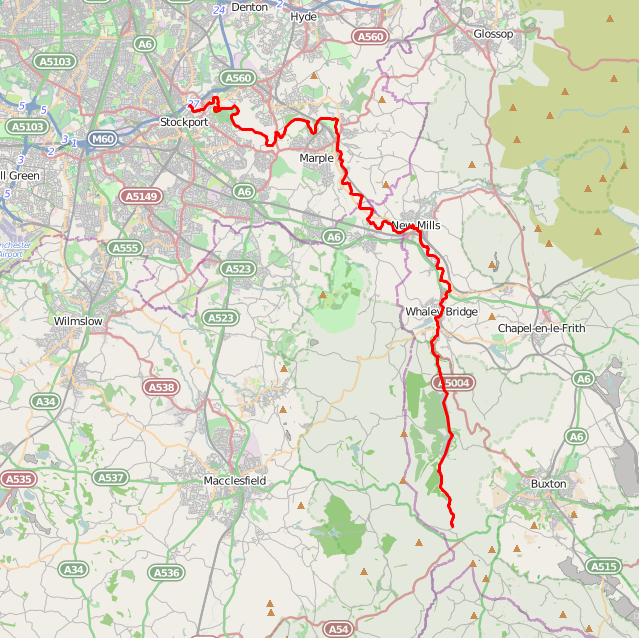
- The River Goyt is highlighted in red

Location
- Country: England

Physical characteristics
- Source
  - location: 53.2360°N 1.9967°W, Axe Edge Moor, Derbyshire
  - elevation: 520 m (1,710 ft)
- Mouth
  - location: 53.4143°N 2.1566°W, River Mersey
  - elevation: 40 m (130 ft)
- Length: 48.844 km (30.350 mi)

Basin features
- Progression: Mersey—Irish Sea
- Tributaries
  - left: Todd Brook
  - right: Sett, Etherow

The River Goyt is a tributary of the River Mersey in North West England.

== Etymology ==
The name Goyt may be derived from the Middle English gote, meaning "a watercourse, a stream". Derivation from the Welsh gwyth meaning "vein" has been suggested, but described as "doubtful".

== Course ==
The Goyt rises on the moors of Axe Edge, near the River Dane and the Cat and Fiddle Inn. The area is known as the Upper Goyt Valley. The old Cat and Fiddle Road from Buxton to Macclesfield crosses the river just as it turns northwards to flow down its well-known valley. The river then flows under Derbyshire Bridge, which was the old boundary between Derbyshire and Cheshire. Later it reaches an old packhorse bridge that was moved when Errwood reservoir was built in the 1960s (see photo below). Further downstream there is another reservoir, the Fernilee Reservoir, built in 1938. The original line of the Cromford and High Peak Railway can be seen near this point.

The Goyt then passes through Taxal and Horwich End where it is joined by the Todd Brook. Thereafter it passes through Whaley Bridge, New Mills (where it is joined by the River Sett) and Marple Bridge. Having been joined by the River Etherow, the Goyt joins the River Tame at Stockport, forming the River Mersey.

The section of the Goyt valley between Etherow Country Park and Whaley Bridge is followed by the Goyt Way, a 10-mile (16 km) walking route and part of the longer Midshires Way.

The River Goyt is reputedly haunted by the ghost of a girl whose Royalist lover drowned in the river.

== Pollution ==
The river's Environment Agency pollution classification changed from moderate to poor in its lower section from the Etherow to the Mersey in 2016, and in 2015 for the New Mills to Whaley Bridge length. Otherwise the quality is moderate. Efforts to clean up the Mersey and its tributaries led to the return of the Atlantic salmon to the Mersey, Bollin and Goyt. In 2025, salmon parr were found in the Goyt for the first time since 2015.

== Tributaries ==
- Poise Brook (L)
  - Ochreley Brook (R)
- Torkington Brook (L)
  - Marple Brook (R)
- Padden Brook ?
- St Chad's Brook ?
- River Etherow (R)
- Marple Bridge Brook ? (R)
- Hollywood Brook ? (R)
- Mellor Brook ? (R)
- Linnet Brook ? (R)
- Strines Brook ? (R)
- Higgin's Brook ? (L)
- River Sett (R)
  - River Kinder (R)
    - Upper Brook ? (L)
    - William Brook ? (R)
    - Blackshaws Brook ? (L)
    - Red Brook (L)
- Shedyard Brook ? (R)
- Waterside Brook ? (R)
- Green Botham Brook ? (R)
- Todd Brook (L)
  - Gnathole Brook (L)
  - Carr Brook (R)
- Randal Carr Brook (R)
  - Meveril Brook (L)
    - Brook Houses Brook (R)

== Gallery ==
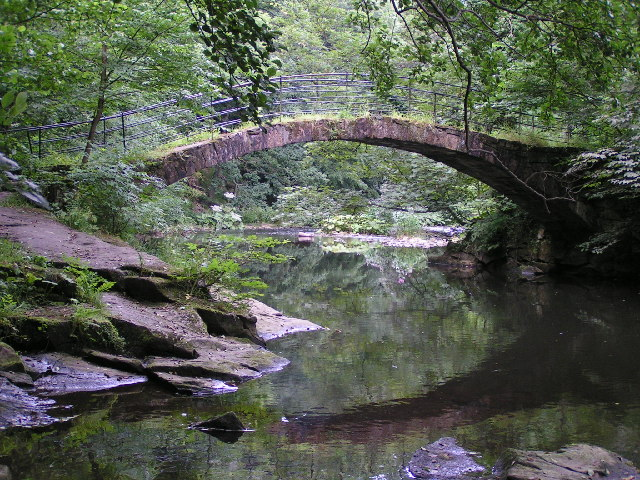
The "Roman Bridge" over the River Goyt between New Mills and Marple Bridge is actually 17th century.

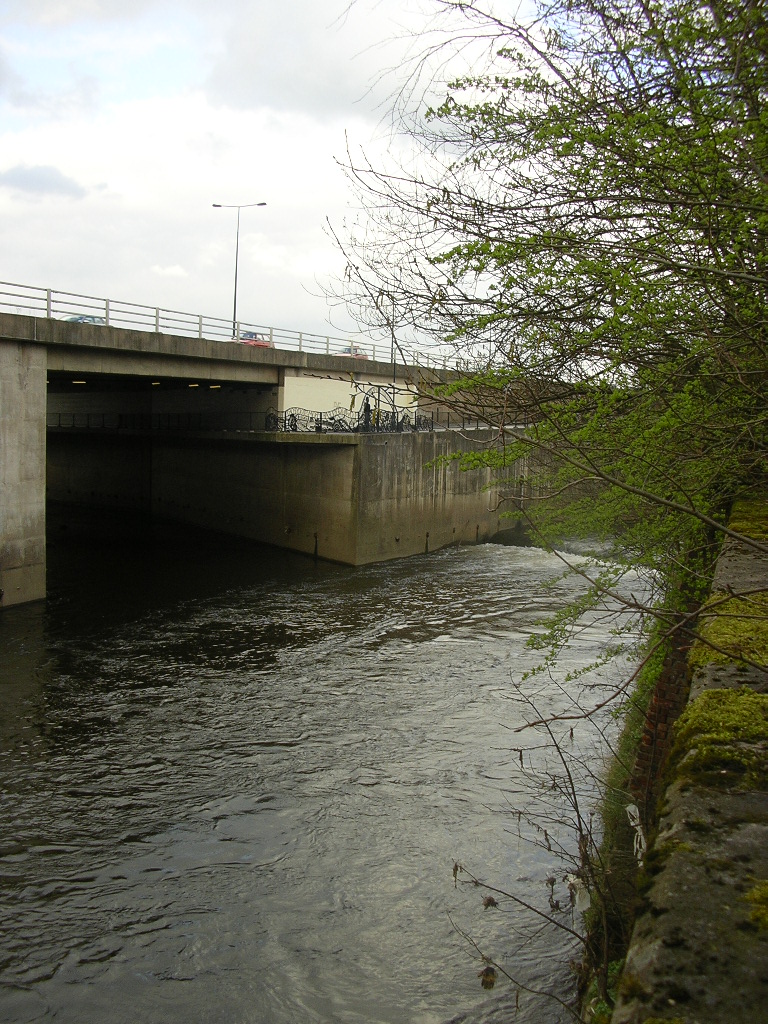
The Goyt (right) meets the Tame in Stockport to form the Mersey.

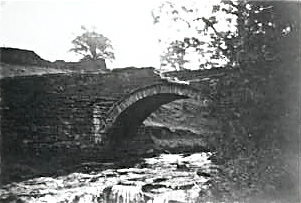
Goyts Bridge – the packhorse bridge (see Errwood Reservoir above) was partly broken in 1960, but restored when it was moved.

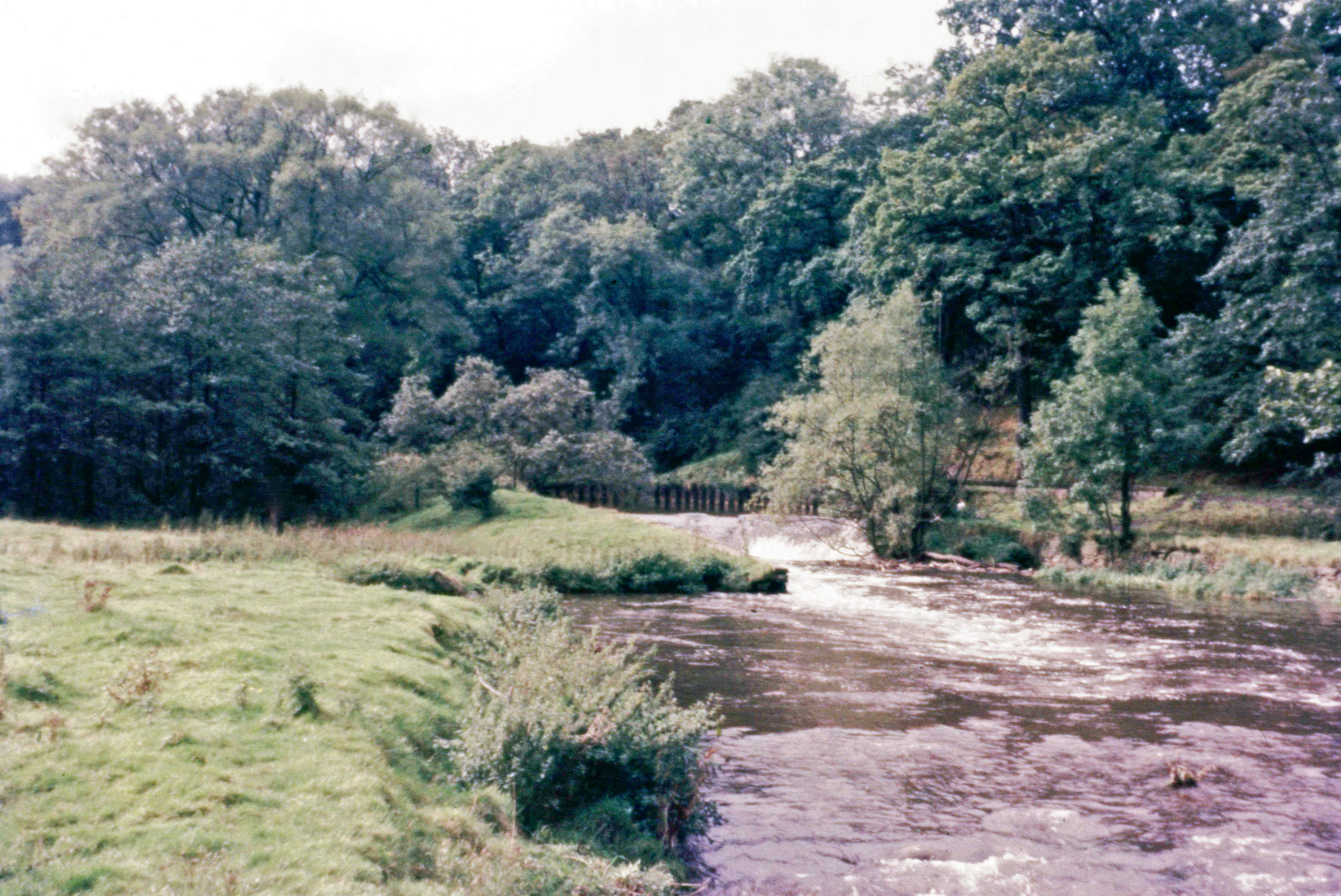
River Goyt at Furness Vale (1968) when the colour depended on discharges from the calico print mills in the valley.

== See also ==
- List of rivers in the Peak District
- List of mills in New Mills area
