= River Kinder =

River in northwestern Derbyshire, England

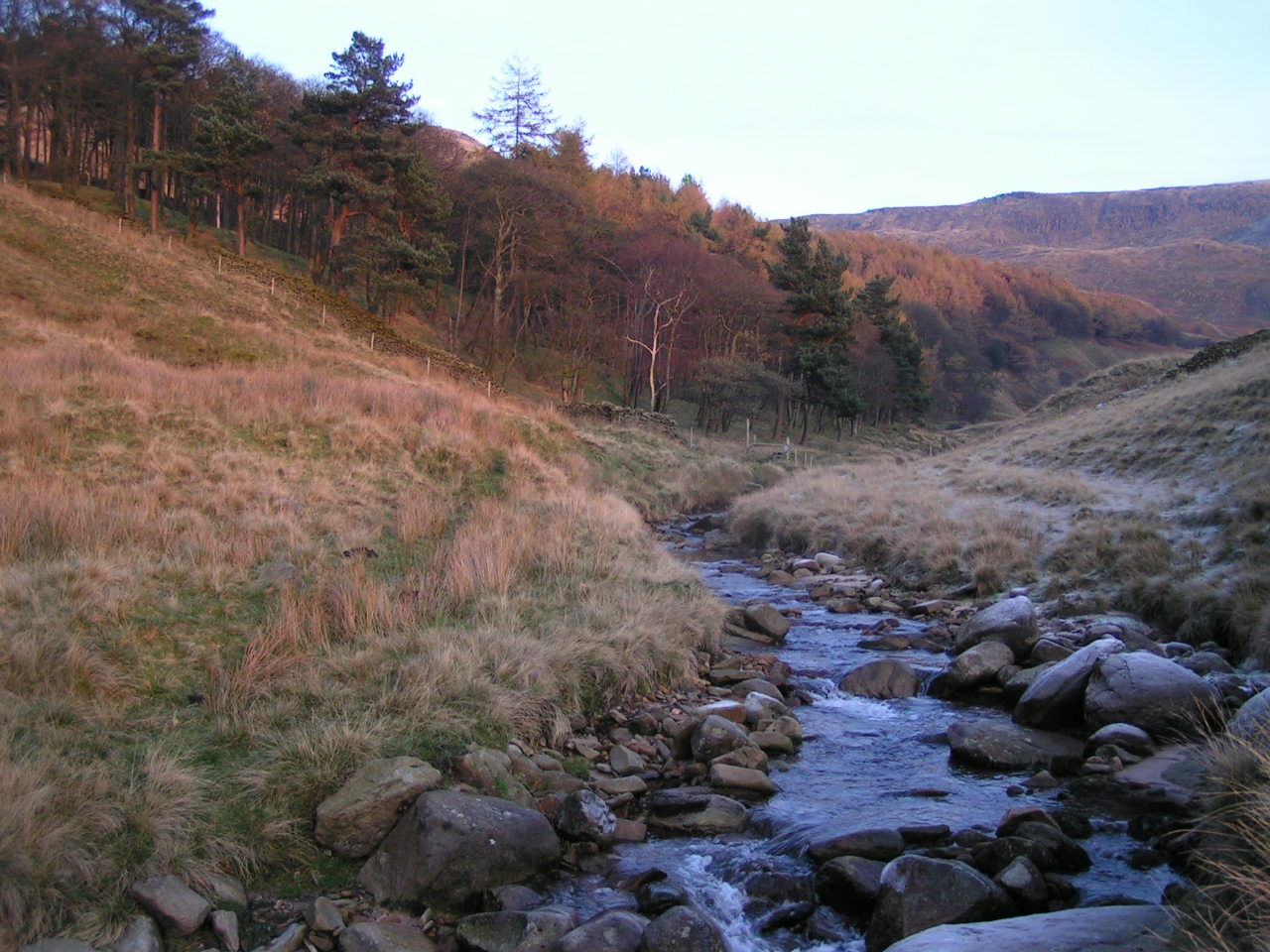
- The River Kinder above Kinder Reservoir

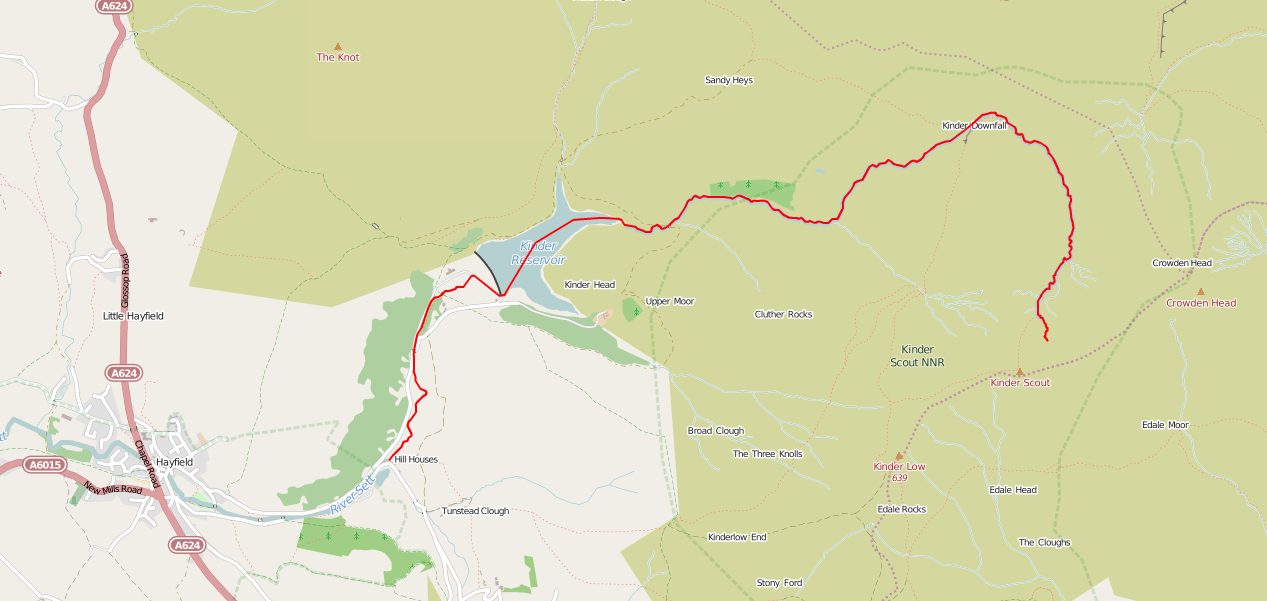
- The River Kinder is highlighted in red

Location
- Country: England

Physical characteristics
- Source
  - location: Kinder Scout; SK089881
  - coordinates: 53°23′22″N 1°52′04″W
  - elevation: 636 m (2,087 ft)
- Mouth
  - location: River Sett; SK050870
  - coordinates: 53°22′48″N 1°55′35″W
  - elevation: 220 m (720 ft)
- Length: 3 miles (4.8 km)

The River Kinder (/ˈkɪndər/ KIN-der) is a small river, only about 3 miles (4.8 km) long, in northwestern Derbyshire, England. Rising on the peat moorland plateau of Kinder Scout, it flows generally westwards to its confluence with the River Sett at Bowden Bridge (a Grade II listed packhorse bridge). En route it flows through the Kinder Gates rocks, over the waterfall known as Kinder Downfall, and through Kinder Reservoir, built in 1903–12 by the Stockport Corporation Waterworks. Formerly, until the 19th century at least, the name was also applied to the River Sett as far as its confluence with the River Goyt in New Mills.

== Kinder Downfall ==
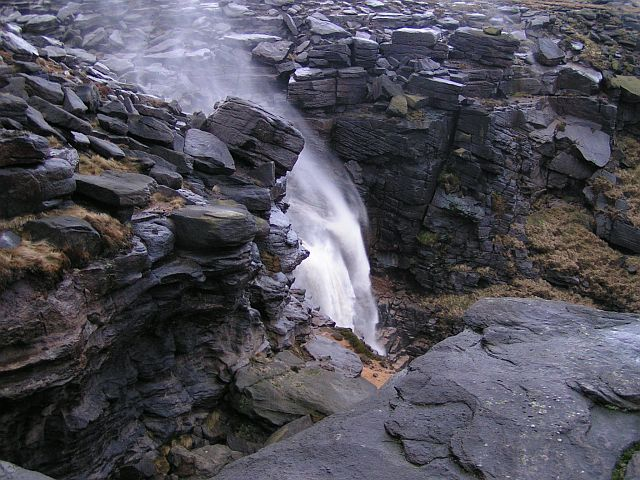
Kinder Downfall

Kinder Downfall is the tallest waterfall in the Peak District, with a 30-metre (98 ft) fall. The waterfall was formerly known as Kinder Scut, and it is from this that the plateau derives its name. Although usually little more than a trickle in summer, in spate conditions it is impressive. In certain wind conditions (notably when there is a strong west wind), the water is blown back on itself, and the resulting cloud of spray can be seen from several miles away. The Pennine Way crosses the River Kinder above Kinder Downfall. When frozen in hard winters, the waterfall is a venue for ice-climbing, and it is also the highlight of a fell race that bears its name.

== Kinder Reservoir ==
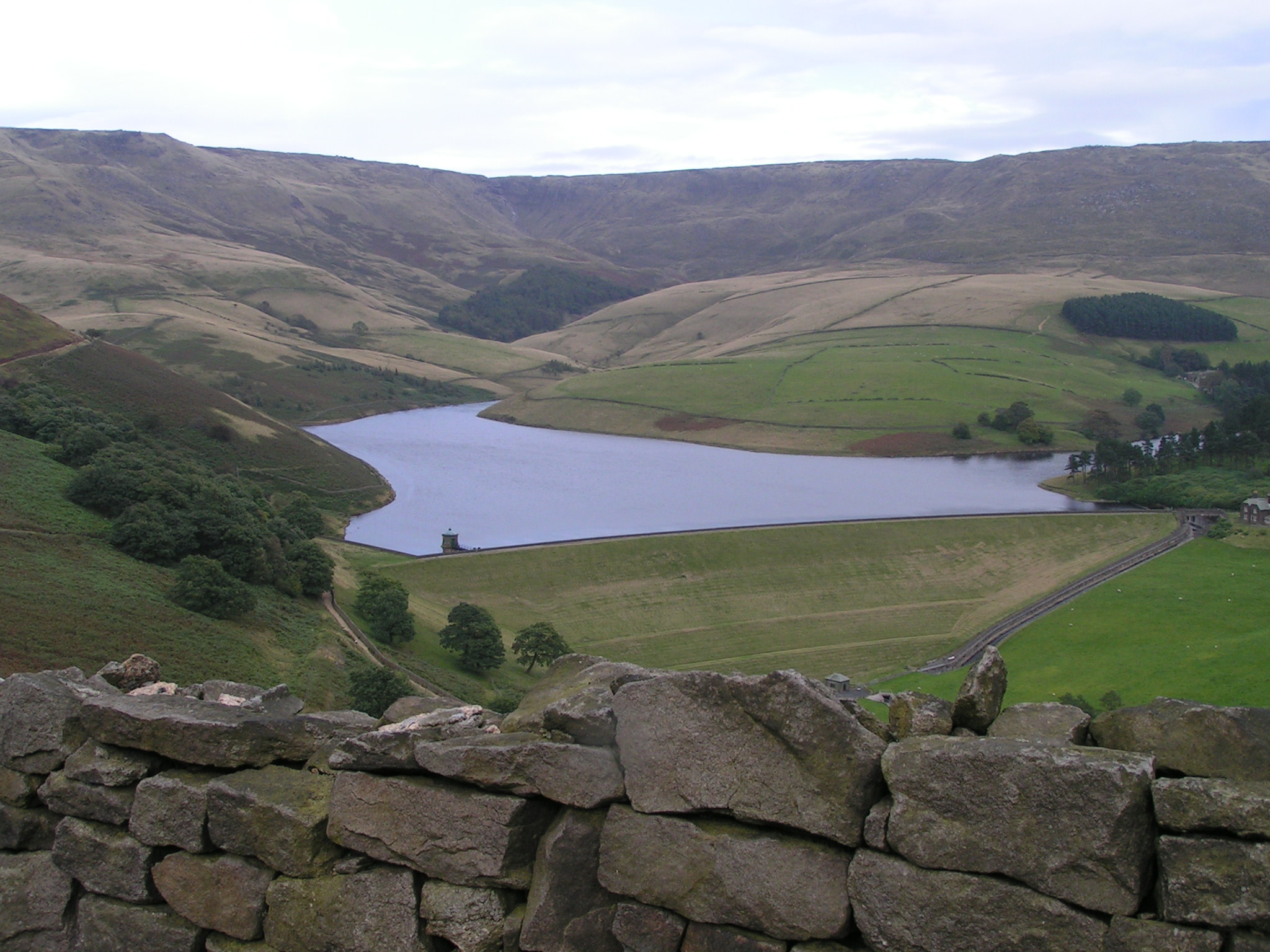
Kinder Reservoir from White Brow

Stockport Corporation took over Stockport and District Waterworks Company in 1899 and immediately started investigating potential new water supplies. James Mansergh, consulting engineer, identified a site above Hayfield. Abram Kellett of Ealing was contracted to build a masonry dam and a standard-gauge railway to convey materials and workers to the site (though some navvies and their families lived in temporary huts built a short distance down the valley). Two farms were demolished during the construction. Work started in 1903 but geological difficulties prompted suspension of construction in 1905 and eventually a change in design to a clay/earth dam. Stockport Corporation and the original contractor (Kelletts) resorted to the courts over financial issues and the Corporation's unilateral termination of the contract. Construction eventually resumed in 1908, under the supervision of G H Hill and Sons. The opening ceremony was held on 11 July 1912. Kinder Reservoir has a capacity of approximately 2,289,000,000 litres (504,000,000 imp gal) and a surface area of 17.83 hectares (44.1 acres). The adjacent filter house was decommissioned in 1996, following the opening of the new Wybersley Water Treatment Works at High Lane, near Stockport, to which the reservoir's water is now piped for treatment.

== Bowden Bridge ==
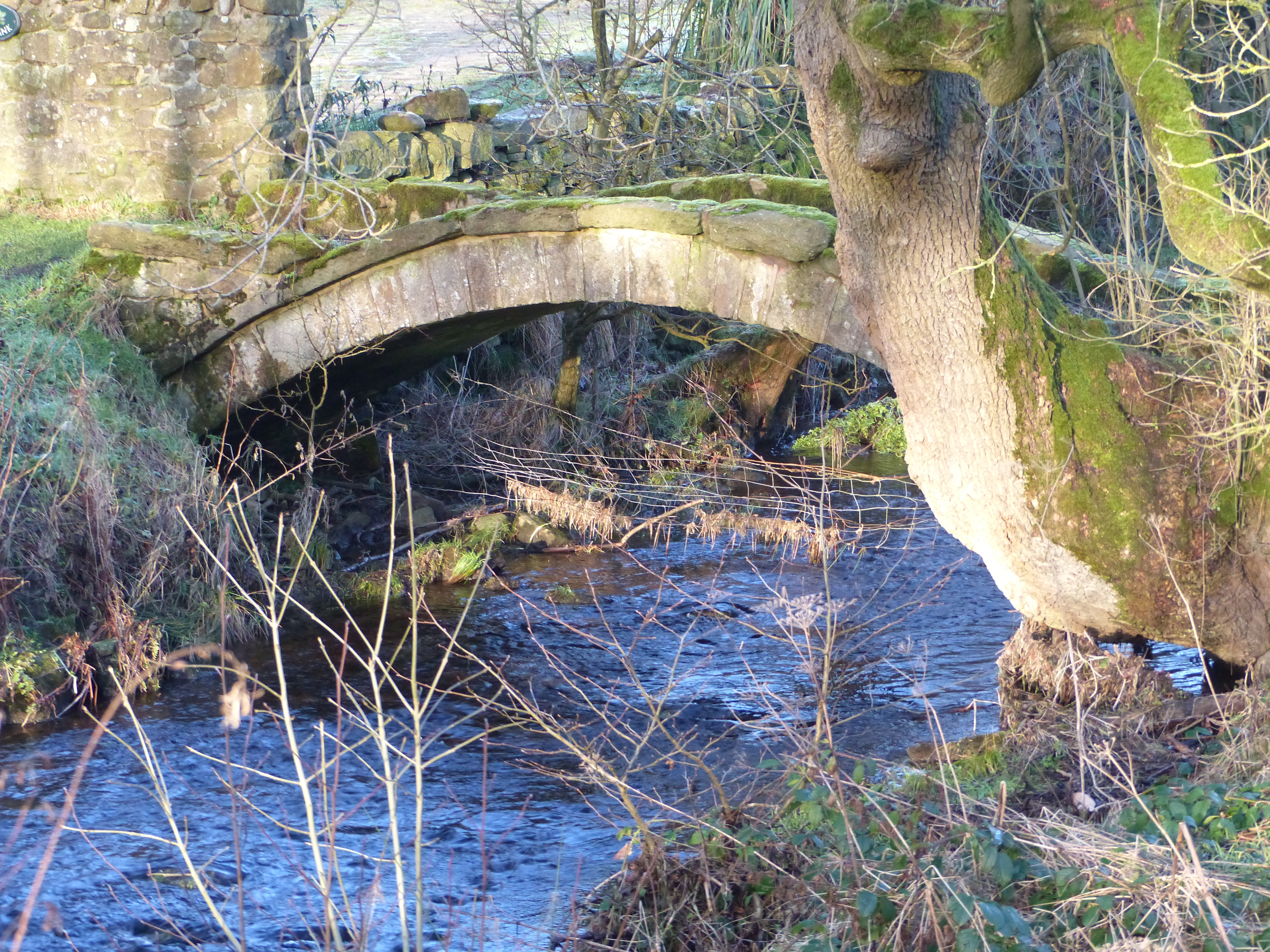
Bowden Bridge

Bowden Bridge is a fairly well preserved, single-arch packhorse bridge dating back perhaps to the 16th or 17th century, close to the river's confluence with the River Sett. It is built from gritstone, is about 10 feet (3.0 m) long and over a yard wide, and has coped sides and a cobbled surface. It was designated as a Grade II listed building in 1984.

== See also ==
- List of rivers in the Peak District
- List of rivers in England
