= Hayfield branch =

Former railway line in Derbyshire, England

Hayfield branch line
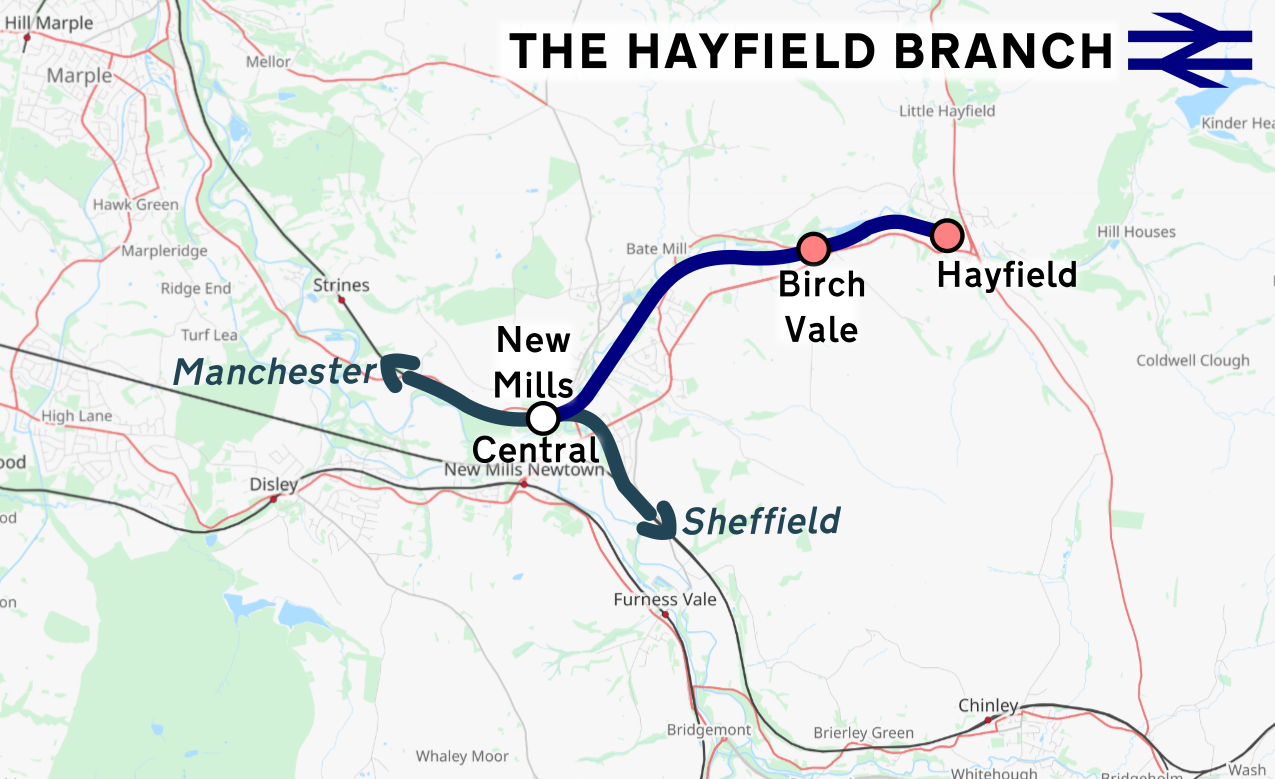
- Route map

Overview
- Status: Closed
- Owner: Manchester, Sheffield & Lincolnshire Railway; Midland Railway; LNER; LMS; London Midland Region of British Railways
- Locale: Derbyshire, England
- Termini: New Mills Central, Hayfield
- Stations: 3

Service
- Type: Heavy rail

History
- Opened: 1868
- Closed: 1970

Technical
- Line length: 2.5 mi (4.0 km)
- Num of tracks: One
- Track gauge: 4 ft 8 1/2 in (1,435 mm) standard gauge
- Electrification: No

The Hayfield branch was a 2 1/2-mile (4.0 km) single-track railway line that ran along the Sett Valley from the Hope Valley Line at New Mills Central to Hayfield, in Derbyshire, England. It passed under the town of New Mills through the 180 m (200 yd) rock-cut Hayfield tunnel and operated via one intermediate stop at Birch Vale.

== History ==
=== Opening ===
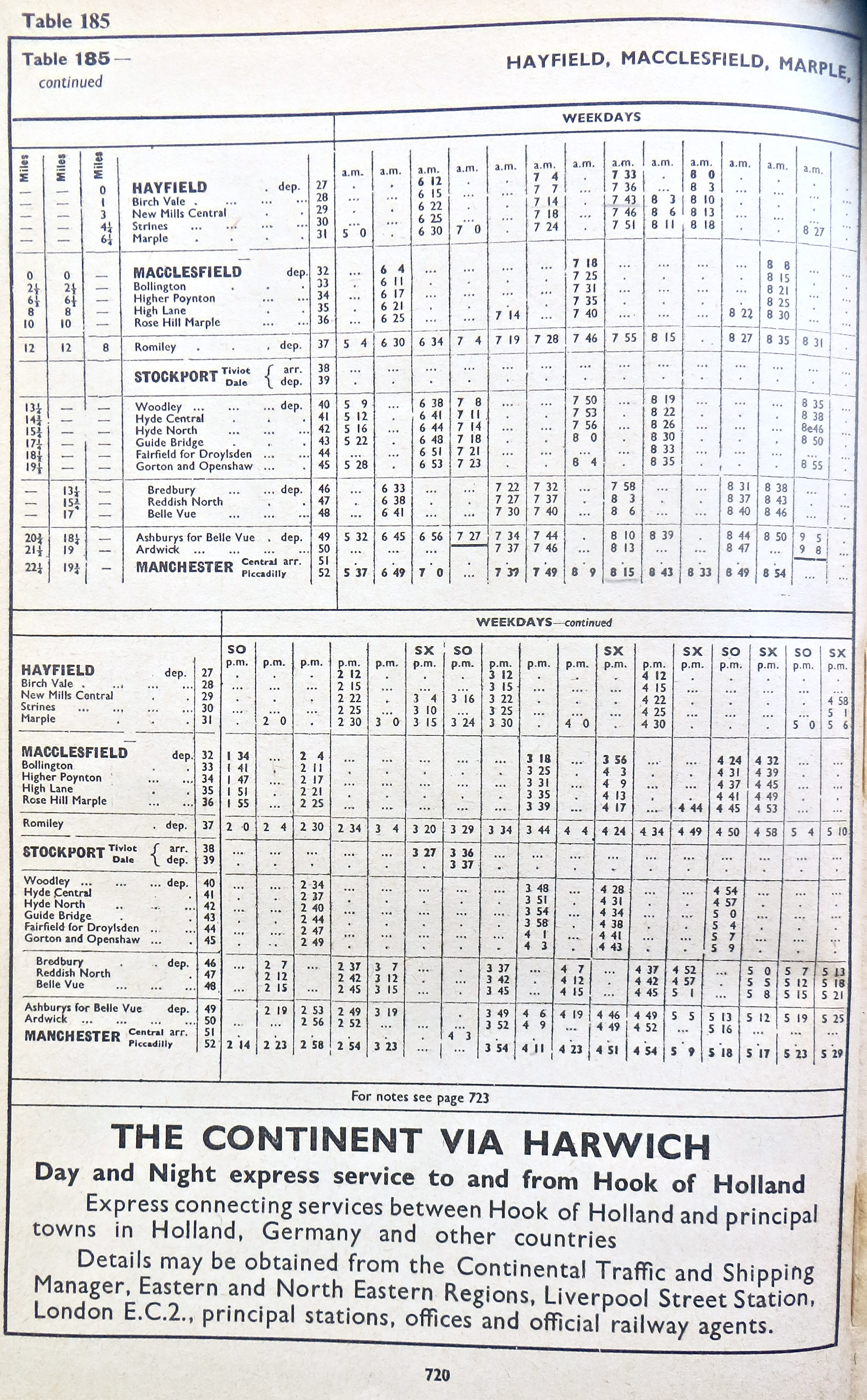
The summer 1961 timetable. The 8.00am train was steam worked until 1964; its truncated modern diesel equivalent from New Mills was slower

The branch opened, in 1868, to serve the villages along the valley of the River Sett and the local mills. It became the joint property of the Manchester, Sheffield & Lincolnshire Railway (later Great Central) and the Midland Railway. It remained a joint line, latterly owned by the London and North Eastern Railway and the London, Midland and Scottish Railway, until nationalisation of the railways in 1948. Passenger numbers were high, especially in the summer months, as the line provided easy access to the countryside.

The branch was subsequently assigned to the London Midland Region of British Railways. Introduction of diesel multiple unit trains led to an improvement in passenger services and, by the 1960s, there was an hourly frequency to and from Manchester Piccadilly, with some additional trains at peak times. Unlike some neighbouring lines, the station also enjoyed an hourly Sunday service which was popular with walkers.

=== Kinder reservoir ===
A short-lived continuation of the line was built in the early 20th century to convey materials and workmen during the construction of Kinder reservoir.

=== Closure ===
After World War II, passenger traffic on the line reduced. The whole Manchester Piccadilly-Romiley-Hayfield line had been included in the 1963 Beeching cuts proposals; however, the government chose instead to retain the Hope Valley Line in favour of closing the Woodhead line to passenger services. The Hayfield line was closed in January 1970.

== The route today ==
The line was purchased by Derbyshire County Council from British Rail in 1973; it now forms the Sett Valley Trail, a shared-use path for walkers, cyclists and horse riders.

== Gallery ==
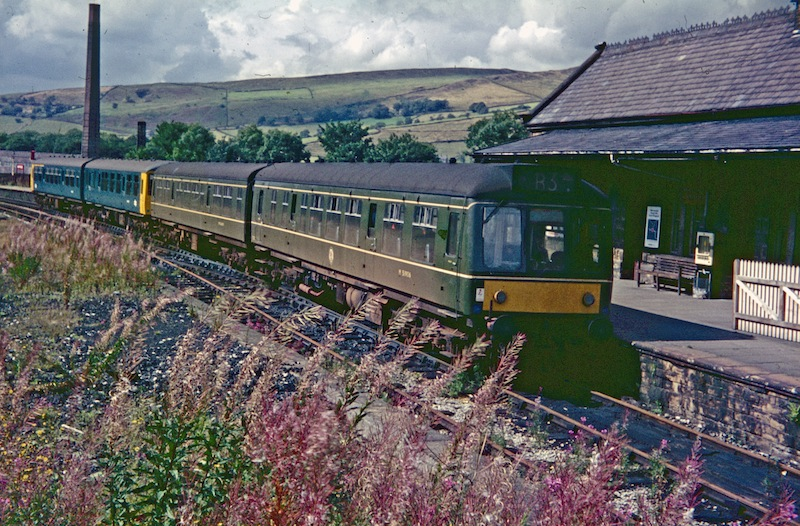
Hayfield station in September 1966

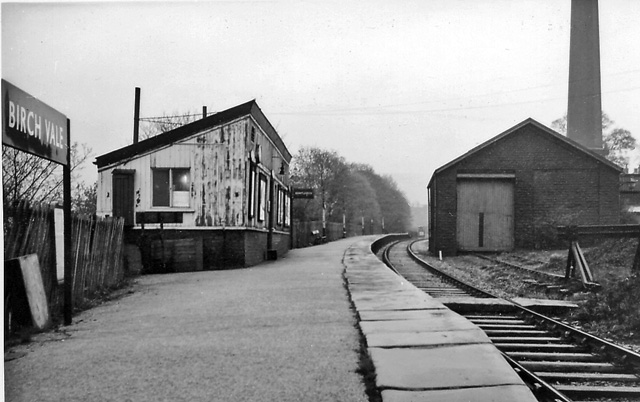
The former Birch Vale railway station in 1965

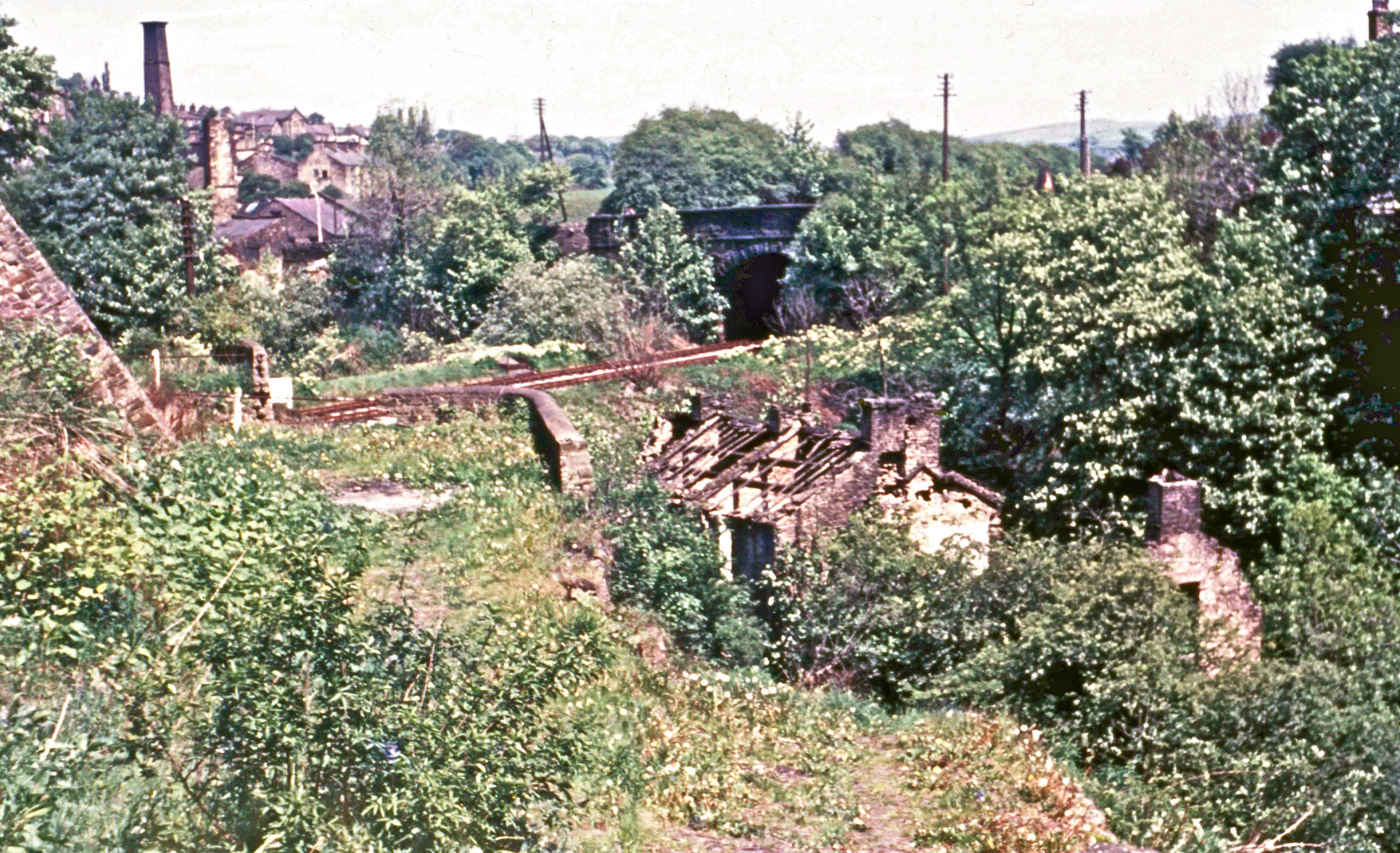
Torr Side, New Mills, where the railway crossed the river Sett

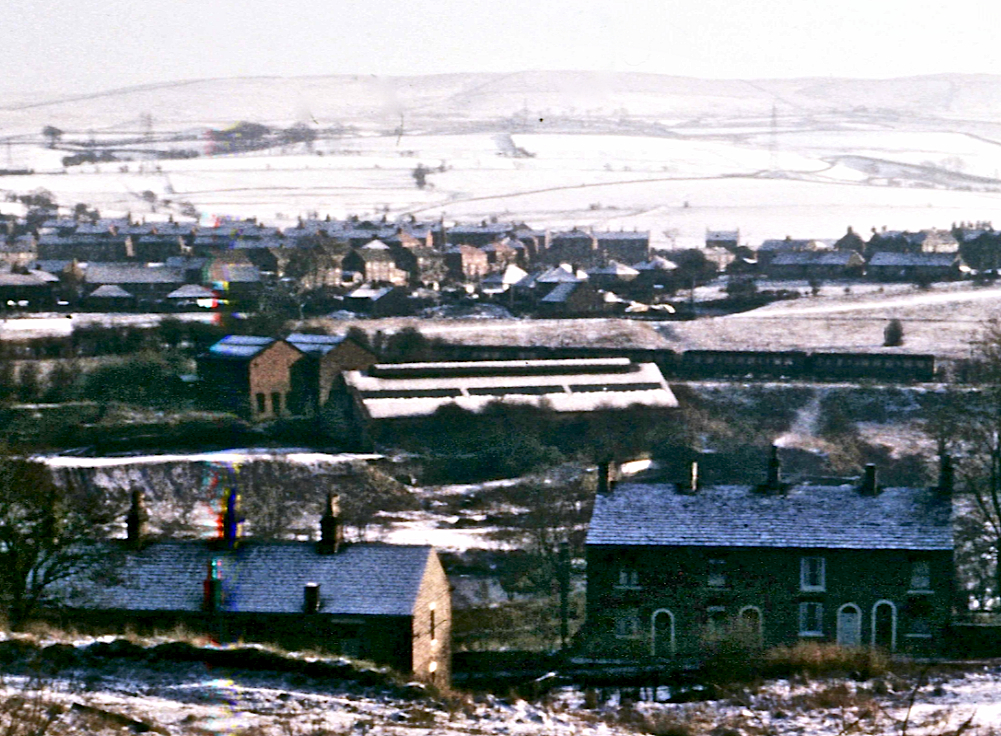
Three two-car British Rail Derby Lightweight units at Low Leighton (1967)
