= River Sett =

River in Derbyshire, England

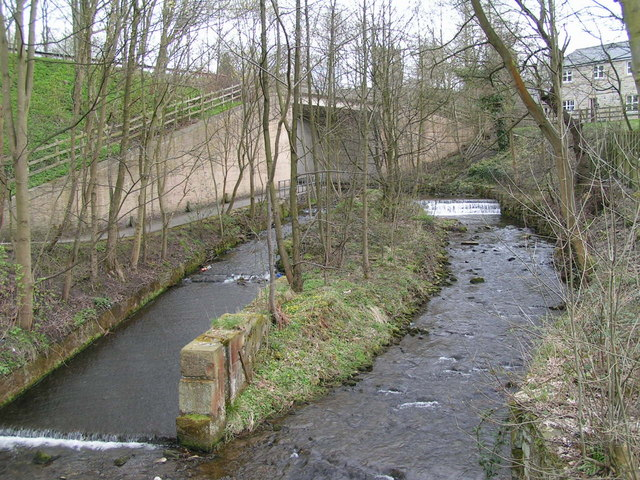
- The Sett passes under the A624 Hayfield "bypass". The tower of St. Matthew's church can be seen through the trees in the background, and in the foreground are the scanty remains of Walk Mill.

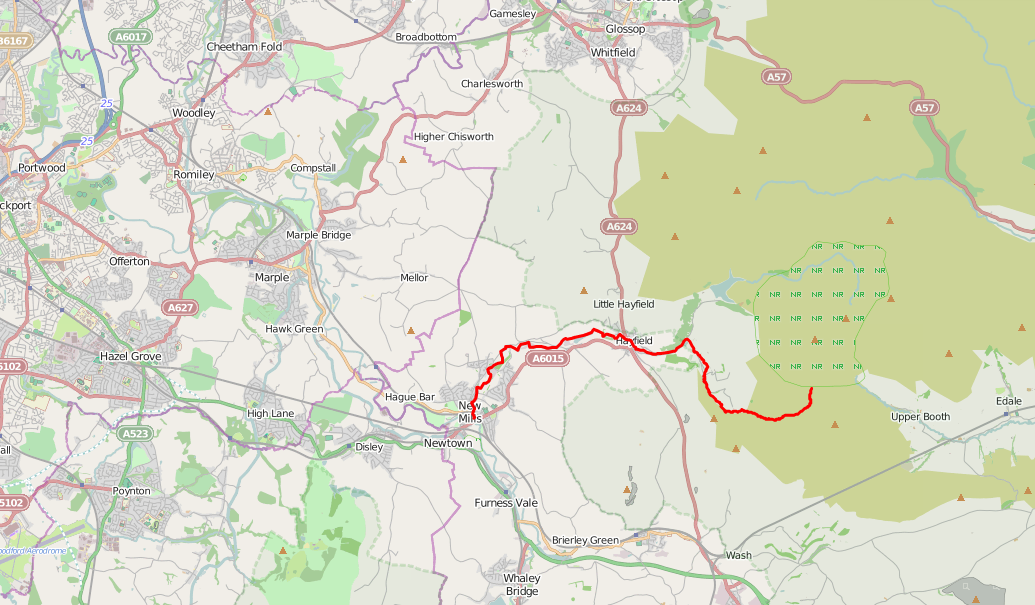
- The River Sett is highlighted in red Coordinates: 53.36440°N 1.99990°W

Location
- Country: England

Physical characteristics
- Source
  - location: Kinder Scout
  - elevation: c.540 metres (1,770 ft)
- Mouth
  - location: River Goyt
  - elevation: c.130 metres (430 ft)
- Length: 16.876 kilometres (10.486 mi)
- Basin size: 47.143 square kilometres (18.202 sq mi)

Basin features
- Tributaries
  - right: River Kinder

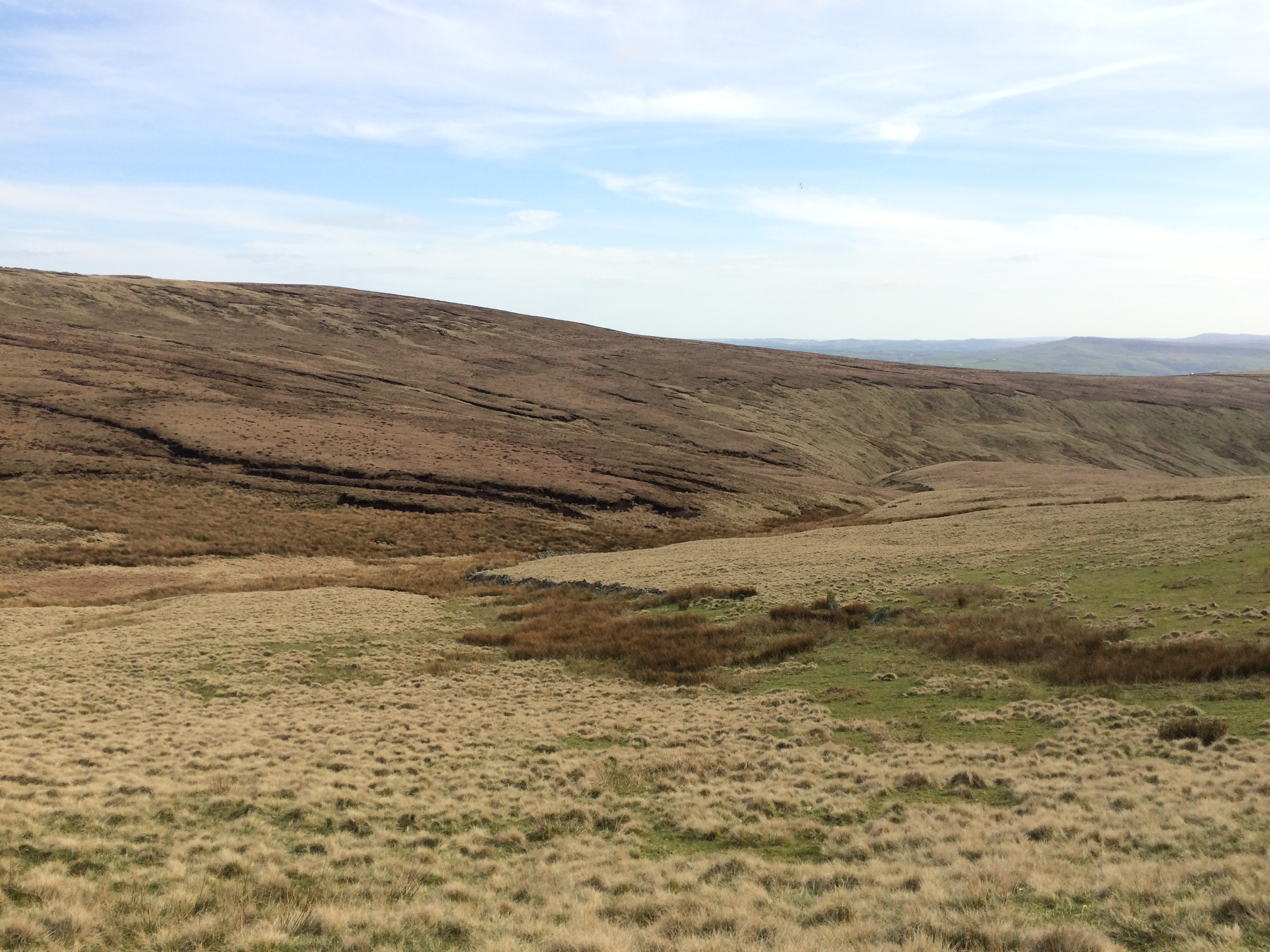
Source of the River Sett

The River Sett is a river that flows through the High Peak borough of Derbyshire, in north western England. It rises near Edale Cross on Kinder Scout and flows through the villages of Hayfield and Birch Vale to join the River Goyt at New Mills. The River Goyt is one of the principal tributaries of the River Mersey. In the past, the river was known as the River Kinder; the modern River Kinder is a right tributary of the Sett, joining the river at Bowden Bridge above Hayfield.

The 2.5-mile Sett Valley Trail follows the trackbed of the former railway line along the valley between Hayfield and New Mills.

The river's Environment Agency pollution classification changed from good to moderate in 2014.

== Tributaries ==
- Dimpus Clough (L)
- Coldwell Clough (R)
- Tunstead Clough (R)
- Hydebank Brook ? (L)
- Thornsett/Rowarth Brook ? (R)
- Gibb Brook ? (L)
- Raens Brook (L)
- Birch Hall Brook ? (L)
- Hollingworth Clough ? (R)
  - Middle Brook ? (L)
- Phoside Brook ? (L)
  - Foxholes Clough (L)
- Hazlehurst Brook (L)
- River Kinder (R)
  - Upper Brook ? (L)
  - William Clough ? (R)
  - Blackshaws Brook ? (L)
  - Red Brook (L)
- Oaken Clough (R)

== See also ==
- List of rivers in the Peak District
- List of mills on the River Sett
