= Hayfield railway station =

Former railway station in Derbyshire, England

Hayfield
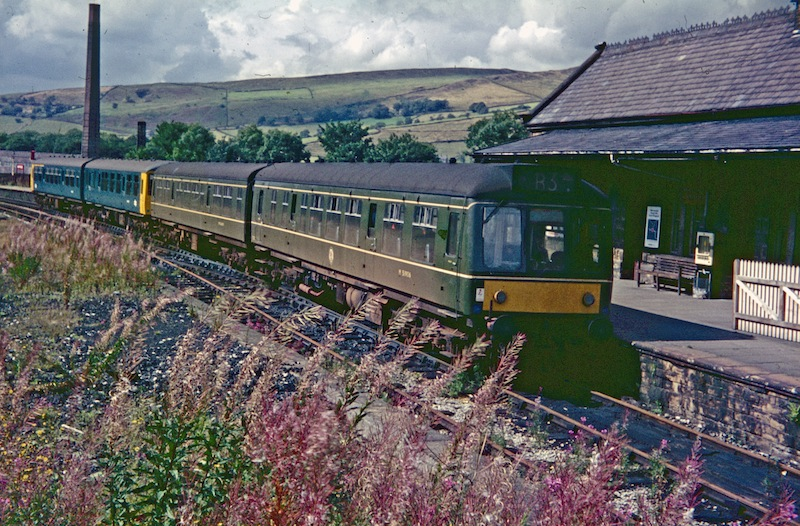
- Hayfield station in September 1966

General information
- Location: Hayfield, High Peak; England
- Coordinates: 53.3789°N 1.9470°W
- Grid reference: SK036868
- Platforms: 1

Other information
- Status: Closed and demolished.

History
- Original company: Manchester, Sheffield and Lincolnshire Railway and Midland Railway
- Pre-grouping: Great Central and Midland Joint Committee
- Post-grouping: LNER and LMS Joint Committee

Key dates
- 1 March 1868: Opened
- 15 April 1963: Closed to goods.
- 5 January 1970: Closed to passengers.
Location

Hayfield railway station was the terminus of the 3 mi (4.8 km) Hayfield branch from New Mills Central station in Derbyshire, England.

== History ==
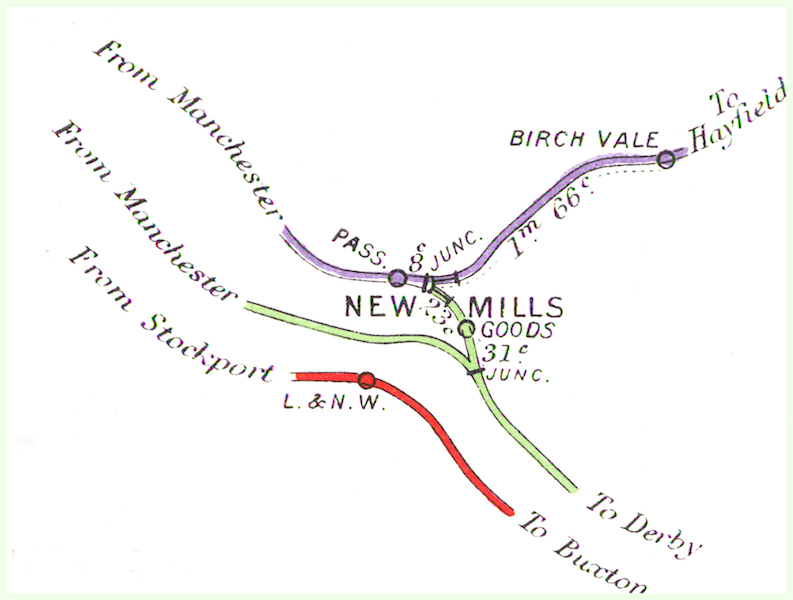
Railway Clearing House diagram showing the junction for the Hayfield branch

Hayfield station opened to passengers on 1 March 1868. The branch and station became the joint property of the Manchester, Sheffield & Lincolnshire Railway (later Great Central) and the Midland Railway. It remained a joint station, latterly owned by the London and North Eastern Railway and the London Midland Scottish Railway, until nationalisation of the railways in 1948.

The branch was assigned subsequently to the London Midland Region of British Railways. Introduction of diesel multiple unit (DMU) trains led to an improvement in passenger services and, by the late 1950s, there was an hourly frequency to and from Manchester London Road (later Piccadilly), with some additional trains at peak times. Unlike some neighbouring lines, the station also enjoyed an hourly Sunday service which was popular with walkers.

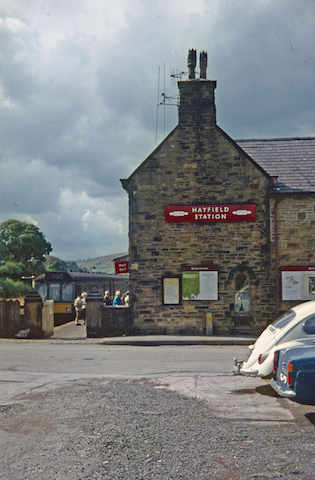
The former station building on 2 September 1967. It has since been demolished, although some of the stone and platform edging was incorporated in to the amenity block in the Sett Valley car park.

In common with most other branch lines, goods traffic dwindled after the Second World War and services were withdrawn on 15 April 1963. Passenger traffic continued until their withdrawal on 5 January 1970; the final trains ran on Saturday 3 January 1970.

The station site was completely cleared in the 1970s, when Derbyshire County Council converted the old trackbed into the Sett Valley Trail. This bridleway runs from Hayfield (the stretch to Birch Vale is part of the Pennine Bridleway) to just north of St.George's Road in New Mills. From there, extensive remodelling of earthworks and redevelopment makes it difficult to recognise the old trackbed, but it can be followed along what is now a footpath to just short of the disused tunnel leading to New Mills Central station.

Preceding station	Historical railways	Following station
Birch Vale; Line and station closed	Manchester, Sheffield and Lincolnshire Railway and Midland Railway; Hayfield branch	Terminus

== Timetables ==
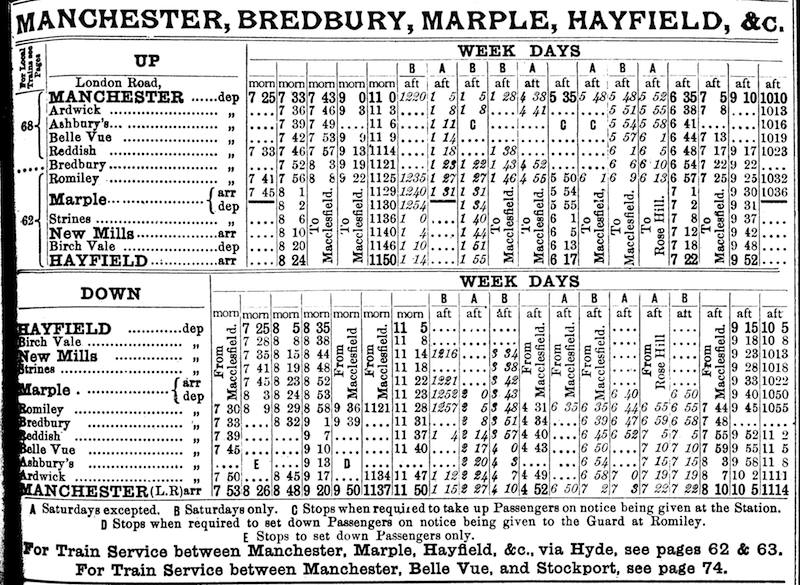
Hayfield branch timetable, summer 1903

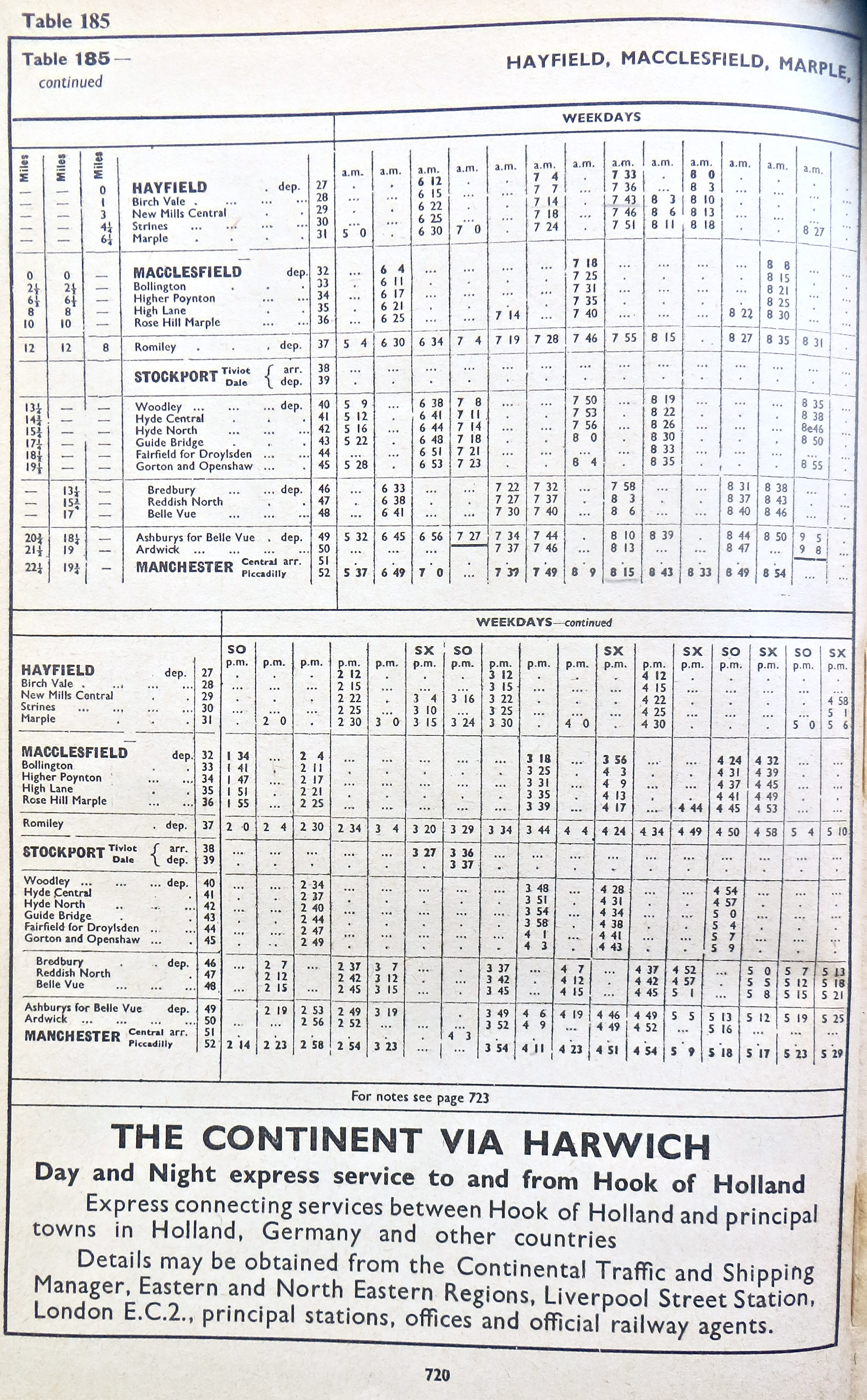
Summer 1961 timetable
