= Kettleshulme =

Village in Cheshire, England

Coordinates: 53.314°N 2.018°W

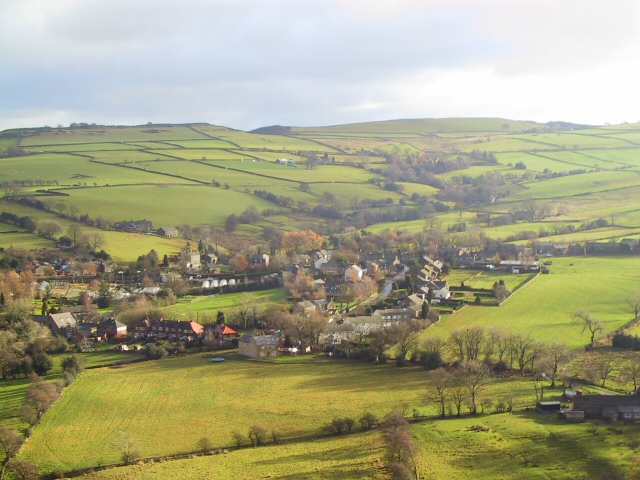
- Kettleshulme seen from Reed Hill in 2005

- Location within Cheshire
- Population: 353
- OS grid reference: SJ987797
- Civil parish: Kettleshulme and Lyme Handley
- Unitary authority: Cheshire East
- Ceremonial county: Cheshire
- Region: North West
- Country: England
- Sovereign state: United Kingdom
- Post town: HIGH PEAK
- Postcode district: SK23
- Dialling code: 01663
- Police: Cheshire
- Fire: Cheshire
- Ambulance: North West
- UK Parliament: Macclesfield

Kettleshulme (Old Norse Ketil's island or Ketil's watermeadow) is a village and former civil parish, now in the parish of Kettleshulme and Lyme Handley, in the Cheshire East district, in the ceremonial county of Cheshire, England. The village is close to the border with Derbyshire, on the B5470 road from Whaley Bridge to Macclesfield in the valley of the Todd Brook, a tributary of the River Goyt. In 2001 the parish had a population of 353.

== Geology and climate ==
The geology around Kettleshulme consists of Carboniferous limestone, shale and gritstone. The original settlement mainly consisted of a mixture of limestone and sandstone buildings, including the old church, built in the 19th century out of limestone quarried near Buxton, seven miles away. The village is 1,000 feet (300 m) above sea level; the nearest weather station in Buxton recorded that the area has a mean annual temperature of 7.8 °C and average annual rainfall of 1,286 millimetres (50.6 in).

== Transport and accessibility ==
The village is in the Pennines, 13 miles (21 km) from the centre of Manchester, making it popular with commuters. A bus service from Disley goes through Kettleshulme to Macclesfield. The nearest railway station is Whaley Bridge on the Manchester–Buxton line.

== Economy and tourism ==
Kettleshulme was once a centre for the manufacture of candle-wick material but this ceased in 1937. The old abandoned mill (Lumbhole Mill 1797, rebuilt 1823) still exists but is not in use. It is a Grade II* listed building, described by English Heritage as "the last example of a mill where water-powered and steam machinery were used together and survive intact". Kettleshulme was the home of 19th-century record-breaker Amos Broadhurst, whose beard grew to a length of seven feet.

The area around Kettleshulme is popular with walkers. To the north are the Bowstones, an early Christian stone sculpture, and nearby Lyme Park. From the Bowstones, it is possible on a clear day to see up to thirty miles in all directions, including, to the west, the Lovell Telescope at Jodrell Bank, at one time the world's largest radio telescope, to the north-west, the city of Manchester and its airport and to the east, the rest of the High Peak including Kinder Scout, the Derbyshire's highest point, and Windgather Rocks.

== History ==
Kettleshulme was formerly a township in the parish of Prestbury, from 1866 Kettleshulme was a civil parish in its own right, on 1 April 2023 the parish was abolished and merged with Lyme Handley to form "Kettleshulme and Lyme Handley".

== See also ==
- Listed buildings in Kettleshulme
