= Listed buildings in Disley =

Disley is a civil parish in Cheshire East, England. It contains 56 buildings that are recorded in the National Heritage List for England as designated listed buildings. Of these, one is listed at Grade II*, the middle grade, and the others are at Grade II. Apart from the village of Disley, the parish is rural. The Peak Forest Canal, and the River Goyt run through the parish. There are four listed bridges associated with these waterways, three over the canal, and one over the river. Lyme Park lies mainly in the adjacent parish of Lyme Handley, but two of its entrances lie within Disley parish, including listed lodges and gate piers. Otherwise, most of the listed buildings are houses, cottages, farmhouses and farm buildings. The other listed items include a church and associated structures, public houses, a drinking fountain, a war memorial, a milestone, and a telephone kiosk.

== Key ==
Grade	Criteria
II*	Particularly important buildings of more than special interest
II	Buildings of national importance and special interest

== Buildings ==
Name and location	Photograph	Date	Notes	Grade
Cross base 53.35679°N 2.04076°W		Pre-conquest	The cross base was discovered in 1958 in the churchyard of St Mary's Church. It consists of a rectangular slab with two circular holes of different sizes, and is thought to have been the setting for two Anglo-Saxon crosses. The cross base is also a scheduled monument.	II
St Mary's Church; 53.35746°N 2.03945°W		1527–58	Aisles were added to the church in 1828 by Thomas Lee, and were enlarged in 1835 by Samuel Howard. The church is built in sandstone, and consists of nave with a clerestory, aisles, a chancel, and a west tower. Inside the church are galleries, a fine 16th-century roof, memorials to the Legh family of Lyme Park, and an organ case by Samuel Renn.	II*
Barn, Stanley Hall; 53.36424°N 2.04613°W		16th century	The barn was rebuilt in the 19th century, and partly rebuilt in 1979. It is constructed with a timber cruck frame and in sandstone, and has a Kerridge stone-slate roof with a stone ridge. The barn is in two storeys, and has a three-bay front. There are some casement windows.	II
Stanley Hall; 53.36422°N 2.04592°W		Late 16th century	A timber-framed farmhouse, the timber-framing having been replaced or hidden by rendered and painted sandstone. The roof is in Kerridge stone-slate. The house is in two storeys, and has a slightly asymmetrical three-bay front. The windows are sashes. There is an 18th-century extension at the rear.	II
Foxholes; 53.35690°N 2.03535°W		16th to 17th century	The house was altered in the 18th and 20th centuries. It is in rendered sandstone with Kerridge stone-slate roofs. It is in 1½ storeys and has a symmetrical three-bay front. The windows are mullioned with casements, and there is a gabled half-dormer.	II
37 Buxton Old Road; 53.35695°N 2.03563°W		17th century (probable)	Originating as two cottages, and later converted into a house, it was altered in the 19th century. It is built in rendered sandstone, and has a roof partly in Kerridge stone-slate, and partly in tiles. The house is in two storeys with a three-bay front, and has casement windows.	II
Clough Cottage; 53.35797°N 2.05850°W	—	Mid-17th century	This originated as an estate farmhouse of Lyme Park. It is built in sandstone, and has a long rectangular plan. There are two storeys and a basement. The windows are mullioned.	II
Lane Head Farmhouse; 53.35341°N 2.02859°W		Mid-17th century	The farmhouse was extended in the 18th century and altered in the following century. It is built in rendered sandstone, and has a Kerridge stone-slate roof with a stone ridge. The farmhouse has an L-shaped plan, is in two storeys, and has an asymmetrical three-bay front. The windows are horizontal sliding sashes.	II
Spencer Hall; 53.35171°N 2.02815°W	—	Mid-17th century	A wing was added and other alterations were made in 1898. The house is in sandstone with Kerridge stone-slate roofs and stone ridges. It is in two storeys and has a three-bay south front. The windows have three lights and are mullioned. The later wing projects toward the road.	II
Barn, Red Moor Farm; 53.34920°N 2.01436°W		17th century	The barn was altered in the 19th century. It is built in sandstone with Kerridge stone-slate roofs and stone ridges. The building has a long rectangular plan with an outshut. The upper part is a corn barn with opposite entrances, and the lower part is a shippon with a loft above it.	II
Cottage, Disley Hall Farm; 53.35349°N 2.02803°W		17th century	The building was originally a farmhouse, and has been divided into two houses. The building is in sandstone with a Kerridge stone-slate roof. It is in two storeys and has an asymmetrical seven-bay front. The windows in the left four bays are casements, some in half-dormers. To the right, stone steps lead up to a first floor door, and the windows are sashes.	II
Light Alders Farmhouse; 53.36089°N 2.05469°W	—	17th century	The farmhouse was altered in the 20th century. It is timber-framed with brick nogging on a sandstone plinth, and has a Kerridge stone-slate roof with a stone ridge. It is in a rectangular plan, and has casement windows, some of which are in gabled dormers. It has a 20th-century timber porch.	II
The Chantry House; 53.35691°N 2.03548°W		17th century	The house is in painted and rendered sandstone, with a roof partly of tiles and partly of Kerridge stone-slate. It is in two storeys and has an asymmetrical four-bay front. The windows are casements.	II
Lower Greenshall; 53.35883°N 2.02217°W		1666	A sandstone house with a Kerridge stone-slate roof. It has a rectangular plan, is in two storeys, and has a two-bay front. The windows are casements.	II
32 Buxton Old Road; 53.35689°N 2.03609°W		Late 17th century	A house that was altered in the 19th century and extended in the 20th century. It is built in sandstone with a tiled roof. It is in two storeys and has an asymmetrical four-bay front. The windows are sashes.	II
Gate piers, Lyme Park; 53.35389°N 2.05117°W		Late 17th century	The gate piers were moved into the present position in Red Lane in about 1860. They are in sandstone, and have a square plan. On the caps are urns carved with foliage and containing floral displays.	II
Forward gate piers, Lyme Park; 53.35713°N 2.05343°W		Late 17th century	The pair of gate piers was moved into the present position in Lyme Park Drive in about 1860. They are in sandstone, and have a square plan. On each side is a semicircular-headed niche, and at the rear are buttresses. At the top of each pier is a moulded cornice supporting an urn with acanthus leaves and a floral display.	II
Jackson's Cottage; 53.36097°N 2.05128°W		Late 17th century	The house was altered and extended in the 18th century. It is in sandstone with a Kerridge stone-slate roof. Originally it had a rectangular plan, the alterations were made to the rear and to the right. The house is in two storeys, and has a four-bay front. The windows are casements under stone lintels.	II
Shrigley Cottage; 53.35505°N 2.00927°W	—	Late 17th century	Originating as a farmhouse, the building was altered in the 19th and 20th centuries. It is in sandstone with a Kerridge stone-slate roof. The house has a rectangular plan, with 1½ storeys and an attic, and a four-bay west front. The windows are casements, the window in the upper floor being in a gabled dormer.	II
Vicarage; 53.35692°N 2.04131°W		Late 17th century	The vicarage was altered and extended in 1861. It is built in pebbledashed stone, and has a roof of Kerridge stone-slate with a stone ridge. The vicarage has a double-pile plan, and is in two storeys with a four-bay front. On the front are two-storey canted bay windows, and a projecting gabled porch. The windows are sashes.	II
Hagg Bank Farmhouse; 53.36189°N 2.03660°W		1695	This originated as a two-room wing of an L-shaped farm. It is built in sandstone with a Welsh slate roof. Additions and alterations were made in the 18th and 19th centuries. There is a gabled front with ball finials. Some of the windows are mullioned.	II
8 and 10 Ring O'Bells Lane; 53.35677°N 2.03851°W		c. 1700	This was originally two cottages, then a public house, and since 1940 has been a Quaker meeting house and a cottage. It is built in sandstone, and has a Kerridge stone-slate roof. The building has a rectangular plan, is in two storeys, and has an irregular seven-bay front. The windows are horizontally sliding sashes, and there is a projecting porch with a hipped Welsh slate roof.	II
11 Jackson's Edge Road; 53.35944°N 2.04131°W		Early 18th century	A pair of houses in sandstone with imitation stone-slate roofs and a stone ridge. The building has a rectangular plan, is in two storeys, and has a four-bay front. The windows are casements, those in the right house being mullioned. There are single-bay extension at each end, one having a crow-stepped gable.	II
Brines Farmhouse; 53.35191°N 2.02170°W		1735	The farmhouse was rebuilt using earlier timber, and was altered in the 19th century. It is in sandstone, and has a Kerridge stone-slate roof with a stone ridge. At least one cruck frame has survived. The house is in two storeys with an asymmetrical four-bay front. Some windows are mullioned, and other are casements.	II
125–127 Buxton Old Road; 53.35331°N 2.02885°W	—	18th century	This originated as three cottages, later converted into a house. It is in sandstone, and has a Kerridge stone-slate roof with a stone ridge. It is in two storeys and has an asymmetrical five-bay front. The windows are mullioned with casements. To the right is a single-storey extension.	II
Lane End Farmhouse and farm buildings 53.35068°N 2.02560°W		18th century	The farmhouse and farm buildings form an L-shaped plan. They are built in sandstone with a Kerridge stone-slate roof. The farmhouse is in two storeys and has an asymmetrical three-bay front. The windows are mullioned with three lights. To the right is a shippon, and at right angles is a two-bay west range.	II
Lyme Gate Cottage; 53.35654°N 2.05227°W		18th century	A rendered stone house with sandstone dressings, and a Kerridge stone-slate roof with a stone ridge. It has a long rectangular plan, and there are additions at the rear. The windows have two lights, they are mullioned and contain casements.	II
Sandy Gate Cottage; 53.35357°N 2.02921°W	—	18th century	Originally three cottages, this has been converted into two houses. The building is in sandstone with Kerridge stone-slate roofs and stone ridges. It has a long rectangular plan, in two storeys and with a seven-bay front. The windows are casements.	II
12, 14 and 16 Buxton Old Road; 53.35810°N 2.03864°W		Late 18th century	Originally two cottages, with two cottages added in the 19th century, they have been amalgamated into two cottages. They are in sandstone with Kerridge stone-slate roofs and stone ridges. The cottages are in two storeys, and have horizontal sliding sashes.	II
17 Buxton Old Road; 53.35829°N 2.03837°W		Late 18th century	Originating as two cottages, they were later converted into one house. The house is built in sandstone with Kerridge stone-slate roofs. It is in two storeys and has a two-bay front. In the centre is a former gabled porch, which is now blocked. The windows are horizontal sliding sashes.	II
The Malt Cottage; 53.35819°N 2.03880°W		Late 18th century	This originated as three cottages, later converted into two. The building is in rendered stone with a Kerridge stone-slate roof. It is in two storeys with a basement, and the windows are three light horizontal sliding sashes.	II
Moore's Buildings; 53.35811°N 2.03880°W		Late 18th century	A rendered sandstone house with a Kerridge stone-slate roof. It is in two storeys with a basement, and has a symmetrical two-bay gabled front. The windows are horizontal sliding sashes with three lights.	II
Muslin Row; 53.35210°N 2.02884°W		Late 18th century	A row of five former weavers' cottages in sandstone with a Kerridge stone-slate roof and a stone ridge. They have a long rectangular plan, are in two storeys, and have casement windows.	II
Stone Seat; 53.35299°N 2.02917°W	—	Late 18th century (probable)	A sandstone house with a Welsh slate roof. It is in two storeys, and has a symmetrical two-bay front. The windows are mullioned and contain casements.	II
White Horse Hotel; 53.35804°N 2.03835°W		Late 18th century	The public house was extended and altered in 1869. It is stuccoed with a Welsh slate roof, and has an L-shaped plan. The front has three bays, the right bay being in three storeys and gabled, and the other bays being in two storeys. The windows are sashes, those in the right bay having flat rusticated heads with keystones carved with palmettes. The doorcase has pilasters, a cornice and rectangular fanlight.	II
Canal bridge 23; 53.36939°N 2.04423°W		c. 1800	An accommodation bridge over the Peak Forest Canal. It was designed by Benjamin Outram, and is in sandstone. The bridge consists of a single elliptical arch with plain parapets, and curving wing walls ending in square pilasters.	II
Canal bridge 26; 53.36152°N 2.03016°W		c. 1800	The bridge carries Redhouse Lane over the Peak Forest Canal. It was designed by Benjamin Outram, and is in sandstone. The bridge consists of a single elliptical arch with plain parapets and curving wing walls ending in square pilasters.	II
Canal bridge 27; 53.36010°N 2.02304°W		c. 1800	The bridge carries Lower Greenshall Lane over the Peak Forest Canal. It was designed by Benjamin Outram, and is in sandstone. The bridge consists of a single elliptical arch with plain parapets and curving wing walls ending in square pilasters.	II
Tomb of Samuel Bridge; 53.35705°N 2.04038°W		1814	The tomb is in the churchyard of St Mary's Church. It is a Neoclassical box tomb in sandstone with plaques in Welsh slate. At the corners are clasping fluted pilasters, and in the frieze are urns. In the centre of the tomb is a gadrooned urn with an acorn finial.	II
Schoolhouse Surgery; 53.35809°N 2.03915°W		1823	This was built as a school, and has since had various uses, including being an auction house, a church hall, and a surgery. The interior has been badly damaged by a fire, and no internal features remain. The building is in sandstone with Kerridge stone-slate roofs. It is in two storeys and has a nearly symmetrical five-bay front. The windows have two lights and are mullioned. The whole building is castellated, and there are pinnacles on the corners.	II
Hague Bridge; 53.36561°N 2.02362°W		Early 19th century	The bridge carries Waterside Road over the River Goyt from Disley into New Mills. It is in sandstone and consists of a low elliptical arch with a plain parapet. At the ends of the bridge are angled wing walls with square pilasters at each end.	II
White Cottage; 53.36203°N 2.02899°W		Early 19th century	This was originally a tollhouse. It is in rendered and painted sandstone, and has a pyramidal Welsh slate roof with a central chimney. The house is in two storeys. On the road front is a doorway, and the windows are casements, those on the side being in semicircular recesses.	II
Woodend House; 53.36878°N 2.03500°W		Early 19th century	A rendered sandstone house with a Welsh slate roof. It is in two storeys, and has an asymmetrical three-bay front. The windows are sashes, and the doorcase is round-headed with a projecting keystone and a fanlight.	II
The Grey Cottage; 53.35953°N 2.04104°W		c. 1830	The house is in sandstone with a Kerridge stone-slate roof. It has a rectangular plan, is in two storeys, and has a symmetrical three-bay front. The entrance is on the right side, and the windows are sashes.	II
Woodbank Farmhouse; 53.35914°N 2.05318°W	—	c. 1830	A stuccoed house with a hipped Welsh slate roof. It has a double-pile plan, is in two storeys, and has a symmetrical three-bay front. The end bays project slightly, and have triangular pediments containing blocked circular windows. The other windows are sashes.	II
Parish Hall Extension; 53.35801°N 2.03895°W		1832	This was built as an infants' school, and has since had different uses. The building is in sandstone with Kerridge stone-slate roofs and stone ridges. It is in two storeys and has a symmetrical three-bay front. The windows have two lights and are mullioned with hood moulds.	II
Fountain; 53.35875°N 2.03927°W		1834	The fountain is mainly in gritstone, and has a square plinth and pillar. On the sides are semicircular-headed niches containing cast iron fountains in the shape of lions' heads, emptying into semicircular basins. On the plinth is a sandstone block. At the top of the fountain is a cornice with a pyramidal roof surmounted by an urn.	II
Dryhurst Lodge; 53.35970°N 2.03337°W		c. 1835	A brick house on a sandstone plinth with sandstone dressings and a pyramidal roof in Welsh slate. It has a double-pile plan, is in two storeys, and has a symmetrical three-bay front with brick pilasters at the corners. The windows are sashes, and there is a semicircular-headed doorcase with a fanlight. At the rear are service rooms and former stables.	II
Ram's Head Hotel; 53.35838°N 2.03955°W		c. 1840	A public house in pebbledashed sandstone with slate roofs, in Tudor style. It has 2½ storeys and a symmetrical five-bay front. The outer two bays on each side are gabled, and there is a central single-storey porch. The windows are mullioned, and at the sides of the porch and in the gables are lancet windows. On top of the central bay is a carved ram's head. In front of the building is a mounting block with four steps, which is included in the listing.	II
Former stables, Ram's Head Hotel; 53.35836°N 2.04009°W		c. 1840	The building is in sandstone with a green slate roof. It is a long rectangular building in two storeys, with a front of five bays. The two bays at the left were the stables, and have plain stone doorcases. The other three bays were the coach house, and have elliptical coach openings. In the upper floor are sash windows. On the right side is an external stone staircase.	II
Tower, Woodbank House; 53.35893°N 2.05293°W	—	Mid-19th century	The tower or belvedere is in the garden of the house. It is in brick with sandstone dressings, and is four storeys high. There are three-light casement windows in each storey, and a balcony with iron railings in the top storey. At the top is a pediment with an iron weathervane.	II
Lodge and gate piers, Lyme Park; 53.35699°N 2.05358°W		c. 1860	These were designed by Alfred Darbyshire. The lodge is in sandstone with a Kerridge stone-slate roof, and is in Jacobean style. It has an L-shaped plan, is in two storeys with a basement, and has a projecting gabled front. The windows are mullioned and transomed. The gate piers are also in sandstone, with ball finials. Between them are iron gates, and they are flanked by low wing walls with railings.	II
Lychgate, St Mary's Church; 53.35799°N 2.03939°W		1891	The lychgate is at the entry to the churchyard. It has a sandstone base, with an open timber frame supporting a tiled roof. The roof is hipped, with gablets and a wrought iron cross. On the tie beam is carving in medieval script. The gates are in wood with ironwork on the top.	II
Milestone; 53.35875°N 2.03932°W		1898	The milepost is sited adjacent to the fountain. It is in cast iron, and has a triangular section with a sloping top. On the top is inscribed "Cheshire County Council" and the date. On the left side are the distances to Stockport and Manchester, and on the right side to Whaley Bridge and Buxton.	II
War Memorial; 53.35860°N 2.03973°W		1920	The war memorial stands in a prominent position in the centre of the village. It consists of a tall sandstone cross on a plinth. Around the plinth are plaques with the names of those who fell in both World Wars.	II
Telephone kiosk 53.35857°N 2.03996°W		1935	A K6 type telephone kiosk, designed by Giles Gilbert Scott. Constructed in cast iron with a square plan and a dome, it has three unperforated crowns in the top panels.	II

== See also ==
- Listed buildings in Stockport
- Listed buildings in New Mills
- Listed buildings in Lyme Handley
