= Listed buildings in New Mills =

New Mills is a civil parish in High Peak, Derbyshire. It contains 65 listed buildings, which are designated by Historic England and recorded in the National Heritage List for England. Of these, one (Torr Vale Mill) is listed at Grade II*; the rest are at Grade II.

== List of buildings ==
Name	Location	Completed	Date listed	Geo-coordinates	Designation	Image	Ref.
No. 31	Batemill Road	18th century	19 September 1977	53°22′35″N 1°59′32″W	Grade II	No. 31	
Ladyshawe House	Bridge Street	Mid-18th century	19 September 1977	53°22′22″N 1°59′46″W	Grade II	Ladyshawe House	
Former barn to Number 44 (Ladyshawe House)	Bridge Street	Dated 1759	19 September 1977	53°22′21″N 1°59′46″W	Grade II	Former barn to Number 44 (Ladyshawe House)	
Fox Inn	Brook Bottom	18th century	19 September 1977	53°22′28″N 2°01′23″W	Grade II	Fox Inn	
Cottage adjoining rear of Fox Inn	Brook Bottom	18th or early 19th century	19 September 1977	53°22′28″N 2°01′23″W	Grade II	Cottage adjoining rear of Fox Inn	
Fox Cottage and cottage adjoining	Brook Bottom	18th century	19 September 1977	53°22′28″N 2°01′24″W	Grade II	Fox Cottage and cottage adjoining	
Gilbodygate Farmhouse	Brook Bottom	18th century	19 September 1977	53°22′27″N 2°01′23″W	Grade II	Gilbodygate Farmhouse	
Hope Cottage	Brook Bottom	18th century	19 September 1977	53°22′29″N 2°01′22″W	Grade II	Hope Cottage	
Rivelin	Brook Bottom	18th century	17 February 1978	53°22′29″N 2°01′22″W	Grade II	Rivelin	
Tara Cottage	Brook Bottom	Early 18th century	11 October 1985	53°22′29″N 2°01′21″W	Grade II	Tara Cottage	
Footbridge at New Mills Station	New Mills Newtown railway station, Buxton Road	Mid-19th century	19 September 1977	53°21′34″N 2°00′30″W	Grade II	Footbridge at New Mills Station	
Peak Forest Canal overbridge on Peak Forest Canal near Buxton Road	Peak Forest Canal, Buxton Road	Early–mid-19th century	19 September 1977	53°21′27″N 2°00′01″W	Grade II	Peak Forest Canal overbridge on Peak Forest Canal near Buxton Road	
Church of St George	Church Road	1897–98	2 November 1955	53°21′57″N 1°59′39″W	Grade II	Church of St George	
The New Mills School	Church Lane	1912	15 June 2009	53°22′01″N 1°59′46″W	Grade II	The New Mills School	
Eaves Knoll Farmhouse and attached farm building	Eaves Knoll Road	17th century origins	19 September 1977	53°22′17″N 2°00′28″W	Grade II	Eaves Knoll Farmhouse and attached farm building	
Hague Fold Farmhouse	Hague Bar	Probably 17th century	19 September 1977	53°22′14″N 2°01′12″W	Grade II	Hague Fold Farmhouse	
Lower Hague Fold Farmhouse	Hague Bar	17th century	19 September 1977	53°22′14″N 2°01′15″W	Grade II	Lower Hague Fold Farmhouse	
Nos 34 and 36 (former bank building and attached boundary wall)	High Street/Church View	Dated 1862	18 May 1990	53°22′04″N 2°00′03″W	Grade II	Nos 34 and 36 (former bank building and attached boundary wall)	
No. 66	High Street	18th century	19 September 1977	53°22′07″N 2°00′00″W	Grade II	No. 66	
Nos. 109 and 111	High Street	18th century	19 September 1977	53°22′13″N 1°59′56″W	Grade II	Nos. 109 and 111	
No. 117 [aka The Drunkard's Reform]	High Street	Mid-19th century	19 September 1977	53°22′14″N 1°59′55″W	Grade II	No. 117 [aka The Drunkard's Reform ]	
The Bridge	High Street	Medieval	19 September 1977	53°22′11″N 1°59′55″W	Grade II	The Bridge	
The George Hotel [former]	High Street	Early 19th century	19 September 1977	53°22′08″N 2°00′00″W	Grade II	The George Hotel [former]	
K6 Telephone Kiosk	High Street	Designed 1935	14 January 1993	53°22′02″N 2°00′06″W	Grade II	K6 Telephone Kiosk	
New Mills Free Church	High Street	1844	19 September 1977	53°22′09″N 1°59′57″W	Grade II	New Mills Free Church	
Stone wall with plaque in car park to the north of the Mason's Arms public house	High Street	Early 19th century	19 September 1977	53°22′08″N 2°00′01″W	Grade II	Stone wall with plaque in car park to the north of the Mason's Arms public house	
Blake Hall and attached farm building	Ladygate Road	17th century	19 September 1977	53°23′17″N 1°59′42″W	Grade II	Blake Hall and attached farm building	
Briergrove Farmhouse	Ladygate Road	18th century	19 September 1977	53°23′21″N 1°59′52″W	Grade II	Briergrove Farmhouse	
Farm buildings to Briergrove Farmhouse	Ladygate Road	18th century	19 September 1977	53°23′21″N 1°59′50″W	Grade II	Farm buildings to Briergrove Farmhouse	
Carr Nook Farmhouse	Ladygate Road	18th century	19 September 1977	53°23′18″N 1°59′47″W	Grade II	Carr Nook Farmhouse	
Beard Hall Farmhouse	Laneside Road, Low Leighton	Probably 16th-century origins	19 September 1977	53°21′33″N 1°59′18″W	Grade II	Beard Hall Farmhouse	
Barn at Beard Hall Farm	Laneside Road, Low Leighton	17th or early 18th century	19 September 1977	53°21′35″N 1°59′20″W	Grade II	Barn at Beard Hall Farm	
Nos. 3 and 5	Laneside Road, Low Leighton	18th century	19 September 1977	53°22′01″N 1°59′17″W	Grade II	Nos. 3 and 5	
Howcroft	off Laneside Road, Low Leighton	Probably 18th century	19 September 1977	53°21′27″N 1°58′52″W	Grade II	Howcroft	
Laneside Farmhouse	Laneside Road, Low Leighton	Early 19th century and earlier	19 September 1977	53°21′54″N 1°59′09″W	Grade II	Laneside Farmhouse	
Ollersett Hall Farmhouse	Laneside Road, Low Leighton	Dated 1629	19 September 1977	53°22′01″N 1°58′58″W	Grade II	Ollersett Hall Farmhouse	
Farm buildings to Ollersett Hall Farm	Laneside Road, Low Leighton	17th or early 18th century	19 September 1977	53°22′01″N 1°59′00″W	Grade II	Farm buildings to Ollersett Hall Farm	
Friend's Meeting House	Low Leighton Road, Low Leighton	Dated 1717	19 September 1977	53°22′02″N 1°59′22″W	Grade II	Friend's Meeting House	
The Hare And Hounds Hotel	Low Leighton Road, Low Leighton	Early 19th century	19 September 1977	53°22′02″N 1°59′19″W	Grade II	The Hare And Hounds Hotel	
The Cruck Barn	Mousley Bottom	Possibly medieval	10 April 1975	53°21′51″N 2°00′35″W	Grade II	The Cruck Barn	
Cross base	Primrose Lane, Mellor Moor	Medieval	11 October 1985	53°23′03″N 2°00′46″W	Grade II	Cross base	
Torr Top Cottages	Rock Street	Mid-18th century	18 May 1990	53°21′56″N 2°00′02″W	Grade II	Torr Top Cottages	
Anderton House	Chapel Street, Rowarth	Dated 1797	19 September 1977	53°24′01″N 1°58′56″W	Grade II	Anderton House	
Former barn to Anderton House	Chapel Street, Rowarth	Late 18th century	19 September 1977	53°24′02″N 1°58′56″W	Grade II	Former barn to Anderton House	
Barn at Hollins Farm	Hollinsmoor Road, Rowarth	Mid- to late 18th century	8 October 1993	53°23′53″N 1°59′33″W	Grade II	Barn at Hollins Farm	
Little Mill Inn	Hollinsmoor Road, Rowarth	Dated 1781	19 September 1977	53°23′51″N 1°59′07″W	Grade II	Little Mill Inn	
Almshouses and Church of St James the Less	Spring Bank Road	1880	2 November 1955	53°22′12″N 2°00′02″W	Grade II	Almshouses and Church of St James the Less	
Highlee Hall	St Mary's Road	Mid-19th century	19 September 1977	53°21′58″N 2°00′24″W	Grade II	Highlee Hall	
Storehouse (formerly carriage house to Highlee Hall)	St Mary's Road	Mid-19th century	19 September 1977	53°22′00″N 2°00′23″W	Grade II	Storehouse (formerly carriage house to Highlee Hall)	
Nos. 67 and 69	Thornsett	18th century	19 September 1977	53°22′47″N 1°59′03″W	Grade II	Nos. 67 and 69	
Aspenshaw Hall	Thornsett Brows	1727	19 September 1977	53°23′15″N 1°58′58″W	Grade II	Aspenshaw Hall	
Thornsett Fields Farmhouse	Thornsett Brows	17th century	19 September 1977	53°23′35″N 1°59′07″W	Grade II	Thornsett Fields Farmhouse	
Barn to Thornsett Fields Farmhouse	Thornsett Brows	18th century	19 September 1977	53°23′34″N 1°59′08″W	Grade II	Barn to Thornsett Fields Farmhouse	
Thornsett Hey Farmhouse	Thornsett Road	C17 with earlier C16 core, plus C19 alterations and additions	7 April 1988	53°22′45″N 1°59′08″W	Grade II	Thornsett Hey Farmhouse	
Torr Vale Mill, attached weir, sluice gates, watercourse walls, headrace arches, retaining walls and steps	The Torrs	c.1790 and later	23 February 1998	53°21′54″N 2°00′10″W	Grade II*	Torr Vale Mill, attached weir, sluice gates, watercourse walls, headrace arches, retaining walls and steps	
K6 Telephone Kiosk	Union Road	Designed 1935	14 January 1993	53°21′54″N 2°00′06″W	Grade II	K6 Telephone Kiosk	
Hague Bridge	Waterside Road	Early 19th century	17 November 1983	53°21′56″N 2°01′25″W	Grade II	Hague Bridge	
Bower House	Whitle	17th or early 18th century	19 September 1977	53°22′39″N 2°00′09″W	Grade II	Bower House	
Three barns to Bower House Farm	Whitle	17th and 18th century	19 September 1977	53°22′37″N 2°00′09″W	Grade II	Three barns to Bower House Farm	
Fold House	Whitle	18th century	19 September 1977	53°22′37″N 2°00′08″W	Grade II	Fold House	
Hill Top Cottage	Whitle	17th century	19 September 1977	53°22′37″N 2°00′08″W	Grade II	Hill Top Cottage	
Sentry Cottage	Whitle	1666	19 September 1977	53°22′39″N 2°00′08″W	Grade II	Sentry Cottage	
Whitle Cottage	Whitle	17th century	19 September 1977	53°22′37″N 2°00′07″W	Grade II	Whitle Cottage	
Farmhouse and attached farm buildings (occupied by D Stafford) [Whitle Farm]	Whitle	18th century	19 September 1977	53°22′40″N 2°00′08″W	Grade II	Farmhouse and attached farm buildings (occupied by D Stafford) [Whitle Farm]	
Barn at Whitle Farm (occupied by D Stafford)	Whitle	1671	19 September 1977	53°22′40″N 2°00′06″W	Grade II	Barn at Whitle Farm (occupied by D Stafford)	

== See also ==
- Grade I listed buildings in Derbyshire
- Grade II* listed buildings in Amber Valley
- Grade II* listed buildings in Bolsover (district)
- Grade II* listed buildings in Chesterfield
- Grade II* listed buildings in Derby
- Grade II* listed buildings in Derbyshire Dales
- Grade II* listed buildings in Erewash
- Grade II* listed buildings in High Peak
- Grade II* listed buildings in North East Derbyshire
- Grade II* listed buildings in South Derbyshire
