= New Mills station =

New Mills station may be the following places:

- New Mills Central railway station
- New Mills Newtown railway station
- New Mills bus station
