= Disley railway station =

Railway station in Cheshire, England

Coordinates: 53.358°N 2.042°W

Disley
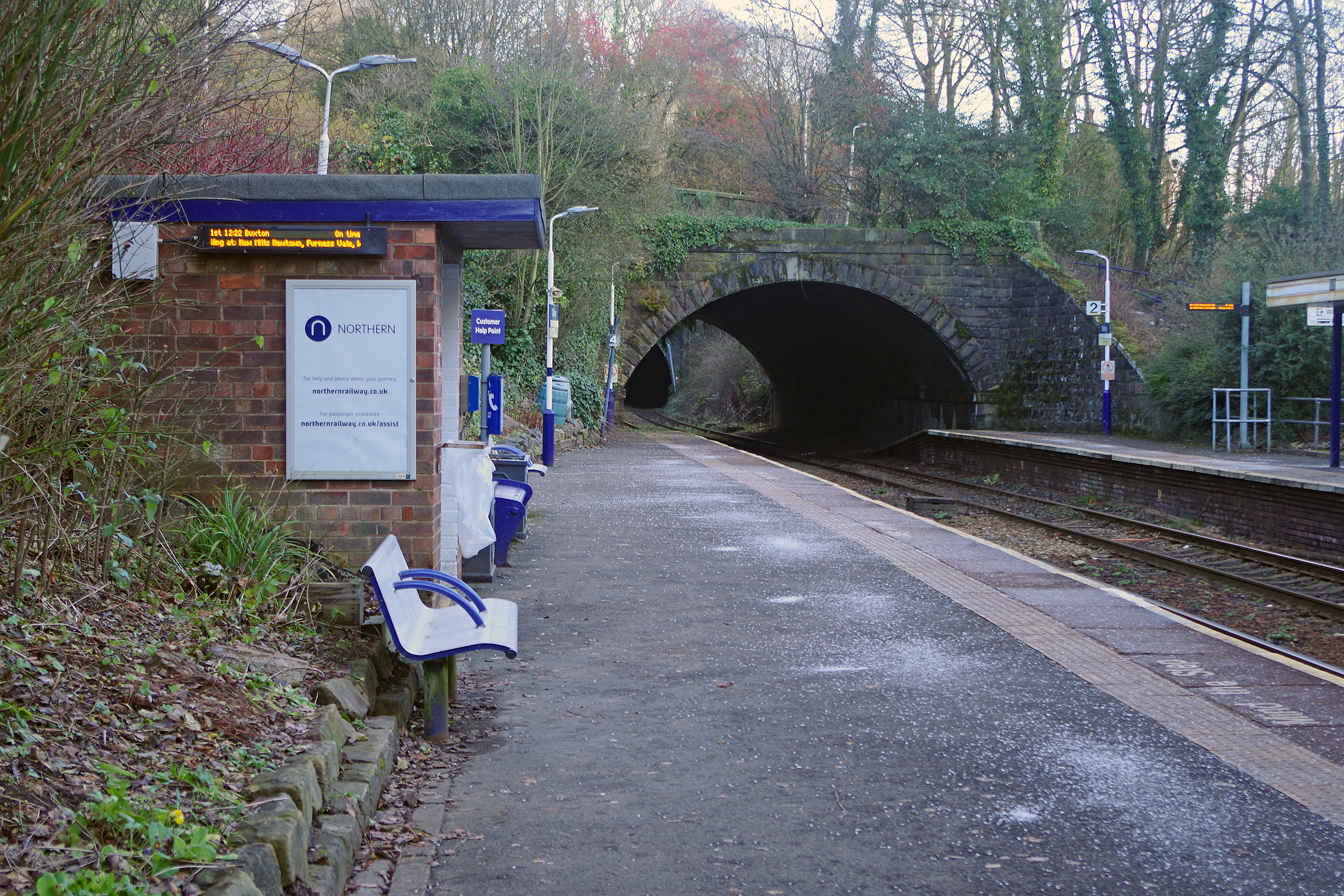
- Disley railway station in January 2024

General information
- Location: Disley, Cheshire East; England
- Grid reference: SJ972845
- Manager: Northern Trains
- Platforms: 2

Other information
- Station code: DSL
- Classification: DfT category E

Passengers
- 2021/22: ▲0.103 million
- 2022/23: ▲0.111 million
- 2023/24: ▲0.140 million
- 2024/25: ▲0.156 million
- 2025/26: ▼152,056
Location
Notes
- Passenger statistics from the Office of Rail and Road

Disley railway station serves the village of Disley in Cheshire, England. It is sited 12 1/3 miles (19.8 km) south-east of Manchester Piccadilly on the Buxton Line. It was built by the Stockport, Disley and Whaley Bridge Railway. The station is managed by Northern Trains, which also operates all trains serving it.

== History ==
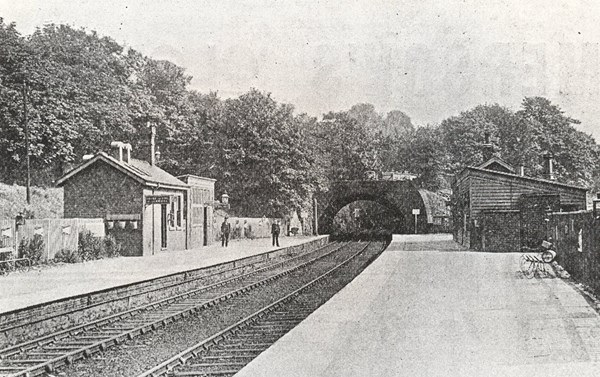
Disley railway station in 1903, after the opening of the second Disley Tunnel (not pictured)

A railway through Disley was first formally proposed by the Stockport, Disley and Whaley Bridge Railway company in 1852, their proposal was approved by parliament in 1853, and construction began in 1854. By the summer of 1857 - Disley railway station had opened on the line with termini at Manchester and Whaley Bridge. The line was eventually extended to reach Buxton in 1863, forming the Buxton Line.

A second railway through Disley opened in 1902, built by the Midland Railway. It travels through Disley by means of the longer Disley Tunnel, which passes beneath the town's golf course. The line provides connection between Hazel Grove (two stops towards Manchester from Disley) and the Hope Valley Line for services between Sheffield and Manchester. There is no station for Disley on this section of railway, as such, it is sometimes referred to as the Disley by-pass line. The picture below represents this line.

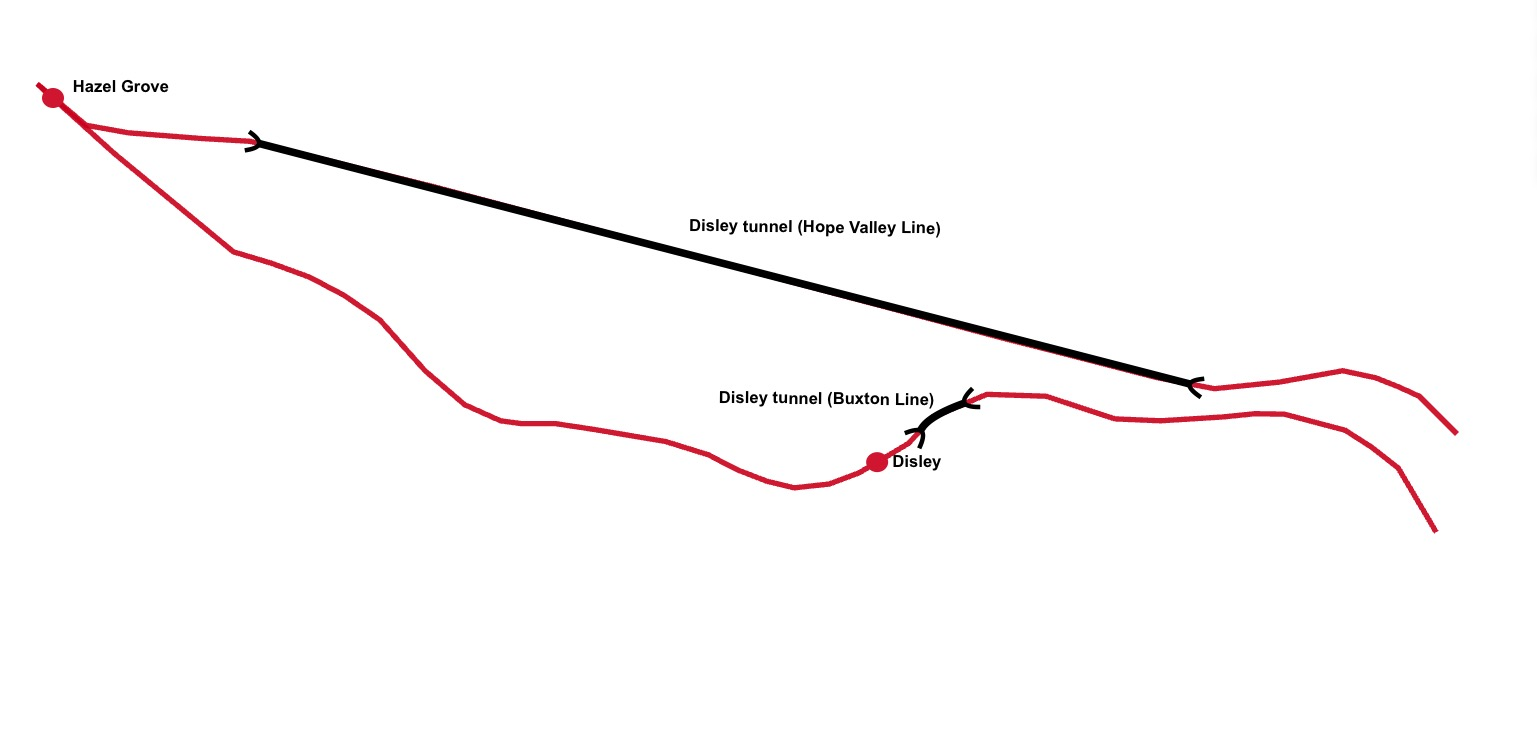
A simplified map of the railways through Disley (represented in red) and the tunnels they utilise (represented in black)

=== Closure proposal ===
The station and line were proposed for closure in the Beeching Report - but after a May 1964 debate between a rail Minister and advocate for repeal Roger Calvert, it was decided to retain the line and the stations it serves.

=== Station buildings ===
The station was built as a small intermediary station, with a station house, waiting shelter, and signal box. Sometime after the 1960s - these buildings were demolished and replaced with the modern day bus-stop-style shelters.

== Location ==
The station sits in a cutting approximately 240 yards west of the town centre. It is bordered to the east by a wide road bridge, which carries Buxton Road West, that is situated just a few yards apart from the entrance to a small tunnel of 174 yards (the smaller of the Disley Tunnels), which allows the railway to cross beneath the town and onward to Whaley Bridge. Both platforms have step-free access using ramps from the road which crosses the tunnel entrance.

== Facilities ==
The station has two platforms in a standard layout, one for each line, and a staffed ticket office, though this is only open during morning peak periods (07:10–10:10). Tickets can also be bought prior to travel at the station's ticket machines and online. Train running information is available via telephone, automated announcements and CIS displays. Waiting facilities are present in the form of bus-stop-style shelters on each side. The station is fully accessible, step-free access is provided to both platforms via ramps and sloping paths from Buxton Road West.

== Service ==
There is generally one train per hour between Manchester Piccadilly and Buxton, via Stockport; trains run every two hours each way on Sundays.

Preceding station	National Rail	Following station
New Mills Newtown	Northern Trains Buxton line	Middlewood

=== Trains ===
The station is usually served by class 150 and class 156 diesel multiple units.

== Friends of Disley station ==
Disley station has been the subject of a station improvement campaign backed by Disley Parish Council and the local community. They have improved the bank on the New Mills Newtown side of the station with additions such as new plant pots, a new garden, and a new Running in board. They have received the 2021 'Cheshire's best kept station' 'Best Kept Garden' award for their efforts.
