= St Mary's Church, Disley =

Coordinates: 53.3575°N 2.0395°W

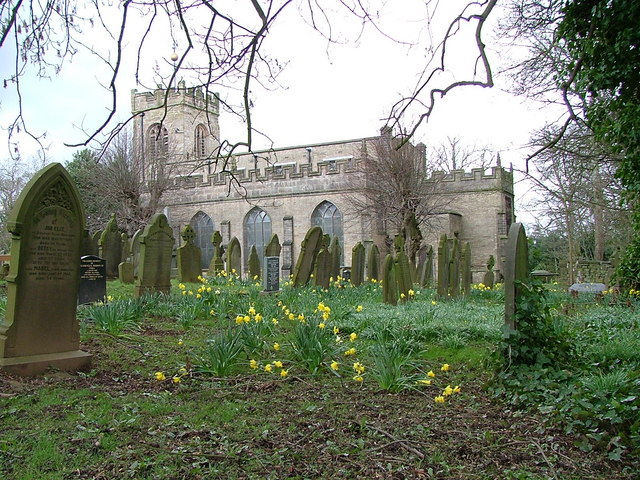
- St Mary's Church, Disley, from the southeast

- Location in Cheshire
- OS grid reference: SJ 974 845
- Location: Disley, Cheshire
- Country: England
- Denomination: Anglican
- Churchmanship: Evangelical
- Website: St Mary, Disley

History
- Status: Parish church
- Consecrated: 1558

Architecture
- Functional status: Active
- Heritage designation: Grade II*
- Designated: 27 November 1963
- Architectural type: Church
- Style: Gothic, Gothic Revival

Specifications
- Materials: Buff sandstone, flat roof [part s/steel, part asphalt]

Administration
- Province: York
- Diocese: Chester
- Archdeaconry: Macclesfield
- Deanery: Chadkirk
- Parish: St Mary, Disley

Clergy
- Vicar: Rev Stuart Cornes

St Mary's Church is an Anglican parish church in the diocese of Chester, the archdeaconry of Macclesfield and the deanery of Chadkirk. It is on a hill overlooking the village of Disley, Cheshire, England. It is recorded in the National Heritage List for England as a designated Grade II* listed building. Its benefice is combined with that of St John, Furness Vale.

== History ==
The original church was intended as a chantry chapel for the fifth Sir Piers Legh of Lyme in the early 16th century but Sir Piers died before it was completed. It was built between 1527 and 1558, in which year it was consecrated and became a parish church. Aisles were added to the church in 1828 by Thomas Lee, and they were enlarged in 1835 by Samuel Howard.

== Architecture ==
=== Exterior ===
The church is built of buff sandstone and originally had a lead roof. This was replaced by modern materials during the 1980s. The plan of the church consists of a west porch and tower, a four-bay nave with a clerestory, north and south aisles, and a single-bay chancel. The tower has four stages, with angle buttresses. The parapet is castellated and includes the bases of eight pinnacles. On top of the tower is a wrought iron weather vane that was formerly on Stockport parish church. The tower has a three-light west window with straight mullions and three-light louvred bell openings. On the south face is a sundial. The porch was originally on south of the church. This is castellated with crocketted pinnacles and a central cross.

=== Interior ===
Inside the church are galleries at the west end and over the aisles. In the 19th-century restoration the 16th-century roof was retained. Richards considers this to be "the glory of the church". It is camber beam in type and is richly moulded and decorated with bosses, angels and crows' feet. The memorials include a number to members of the Legh family of Lyme Park, Including Thomas Legh who died in 1857, and to William Legh, 1st Baron Newton, who died in 1898. There is also a floor memorial to Joseph Watson, the park keeper at Lyme for more than 64 years, who died in 1753 at the age of 104. On the parapet of the west gallery are the coat of arms of George IV. The windows contain medieval glass from the Continent. The organ was built by Samuel Renn in 1836 and rebuilt in 1882 by Alex Young. It was renovated in 1949 by Jardine and restored by Church and Company of Stamfordham in 1977. The organ case of 1836 by Renn is still in place. There is a ring of six bells, all cast by Thomas Mears II at the Whitechapel Bell Foundry in 1837. The parish registers begin in 1591.

== External features ==
The lych gate built in 1891 is listed at Grade II. In the churchyard the box tomb of Samuel Brady dated 1814 is also listed at Grade II. In 1958 a cross base for twin Anglo-Saxon crosses was discovered in the churchyard. It is listed at Grade II, and is a Scheduled Monument. The churchyard also contains the war graves of six soldiers of World War I, and a Merchant Navy Master, an army officer, and a sergeant of World War II.

== See also ==
- Grade II* listed buildings in Cheshire East
- Listed buildings in Disley
