= Listed buildings in Lyme Handley =

Lyme Handley is a former civil parish in Cheshire East, England. It contained 32 buildings that are recorded in the National Heritage List for England as designated listed buildings. Of these, one is listed at Grade I, the highest grade, three are listed at Grade II*, the middle grade, and the others are at Grade II. The major building in the parish is the mansion of Lyme Park. Its estate, which contains a number of listed buildings, occupies much of the parish. The parish was entirely rural, and most of the other listed buildings are farmhouses or farm buildings. In addition the list includes two bridges, an ancient standing stone, and a milestone.

== Key ==
Grade	Criteria
I	Buildings of exceptional interest, sometimes considered to be internationally important
II*	Particularly important buildings of more than special interest
II	Buildings of national importance and special interest

== Buildings ==
Name and location	Photograph	Date	Notes	Grade
Standing stone 53.32689°N 2.02560°W		Bronze Age	A standing stone known as the Murder Stone and dating from the Bronze Age. It consists of a sub-triangular block of sandstone and is about 1.2 metres (3.9 ft) high. Also a Scheduled Ancient Monument.	II
Lyme Park; 53.33809°N 2.05474°W		Late 16th century	A large mansion house with Elizabethan, Palladian, and Baroque features. Modifications and additions were made in the 1720s by Giacomo Leoni, and by Lewis Wyatt in the 19th century. The house is built in sandstone with Welsh slate roofs, and has a courtyard plan. The north and south ranges are in three storeys and have fronts of 15 bays.	I
Lantern, Lyme Park; 53.33842°N 2.04334°W		c. 1580	This is a sandstone belvedere in three storeys with a spire. The upper storey and spire originally formed a bellcote above the north gatehouse, but were later moved. The lower storeys date from about 1700. The bottom storey is square, and the upper storeys and spire are octagonal.	II*
The Cage, Lyme Park; 53.34453°N 2.05190°W		c. 1580	This originated as a hunting tower with a gatehouse, and has had various uses since. It was taken down in 1734, and rebuilt in 1773. It is in sandstone and has a square plan, and has corner towers with domed cupolas. The structure is in three storeys, and on three sides are semicircular-headed doorcases with Tuscan pilasters. There are also three sundials.	II*
West Parkgate Farmhouse; 53.33095°N 2.07630°W	—	1620	The farmhouse was extended in the later 17th century and again in 1950. It is built in sandstone and has Kerridge stone-slate roofs. The farmhouse is in two storeys, and has a four-bay front with a gable at each end. The windows are mullioned, and there is a blocked semicircular window in the right gable.	II
Shippon and hayloft, Cornfields Farm; 53.32567°N 2.02324°W		Early 17th century	The building originated as a farmhouse, and a cottage was added in the 19th century. It is in sandstone with Kerridge stone-slate roofs. The building is in two storeys, the former house having a front of four bays, and the cottage with three bays. The windows are mullioned.	II
Green Farmhouse; 53.33769°N 2.07333°W		17th century	Major alterations, including the addition of a storey took place in 1748, and there were minor changes in the 19th century. The farmhouse is built in sandstone with composition tile roofs. It is in two storeys, and has a symmetrical three-bay front with rusticated quoins. The windows are casements. Inside, the partition walls are timber-framed.	II
Corn barn, Green Farm; 53.33753°N 2.07342°W		17th century	The corn barn is in sandstone with a Kerridge stone-slate roof. It has a rectangular plan and a three-bay front. There are three lines of ventilation slots.	II
Hagg Farmhouse; 53.33937°N 2.08360°W	—	17th century	The farmhouse was later altered. It was originally all timber-framed, the later parts being in sandstone; it has a Welsh slate roof. The farmhouse originally had a rectangular plan, and later became L-shaped. Some windows are mullioned, others are horizontally-sliding sashes, casements, and dormers.	II
Terrace revetment walls, Lyme Park; 53.33807°N 2.05587°W		17th century	The revetment walls have been extended, repaired and rebuilt, including an addition by Lewis Wyatt in 1821. They are in sandstone, supported by buttresses, and have railings between square piers.	II
Cliff Farmhouse; 53.33148°N 2.01831°W		1664	The farmhouse was altered in the 19th century and extended in the 20th century. It is built in sandstone with a Kerridge stone-slate roof. The farmhouse is in two storeys, it has an L-shaped plan, and a three-bay front. There is one stone mullioned window, the other windows being wooden casements and horizontally-sliding sashes.	II
Lower Cliff Farmhouse; 53.32033°N 2.02845°W	—	1671	The farmhouse is built in sandstone and has composition tiled roofs. It has an L-shaped plan, is in two storeys, and has a four-bay front with two gabled bays to the right. The windows are 20th-century casements with stone lintels.	II
Brookside Farm; 53.35755°N 2.06582°W		Late 17th century	The farmhouse was extended in the 18th and 19th centuries. It is built in sandstone and has a Kerridge stone-slate roof. It has an L-shaped plan with a later extension, is in two storeys, and has a three-bay front. Most of the windows are casements, some are horizontally-sliding sashes, and there is one mullioned window.	II
Farm buildings, Harestead Farm; 53.34209°N 2.07507°W	—	Late 17th century	The farm buildings were altered in the 19th century. They are built in sandstone, have roofs of Kerridge stone-slate, and are in an L-shaped plan. The south range is in three bays, and is a former corn barn with openings having wood lintels. The west range is a shippon, and has openings with stone lintels.	II
Gate piers, gates and railings, Lyme Park; 53.33871°N 2.05481°W		Late 17th century	The oldest parts are the gate piers. An overthrow and corner piers were added in the middle of the 18th century, followed by the gates and railings in 1821 by Lewis Wyatt. The sandstone main gate piers have a square plan, contain a single room, have a semicircular-headed window and a cornice supporting a lion couchant. Between the main piers is a semicircular overthrow bearing a gadrooned urn. The corner piers each carries a spreadeagle. The gates and railings have spear heads.	II
Shepherd's Cottage; 53.33063°N 2.06635°W	—	Late 17th century	This originated as a belvedere, and was later used as a house. It is built in rendered sandstone and has a roof of Kerridge stone-slate. The building has a square plan, is in two storeys, each side is in a single bay, and it has a cross-gabled roof. Initially it had mullioned windows, but some have been damaged.	II
Harestead Farmhouse; 53.34225°N 2.07463°W		1696	A porch was added later to the farmhouse, which is built in sandstone with a Kerridge stone-slate roof. It is in two storeys, and has a three-bay front. The windows are mullioned.	II
Milestone; 53.31061°N 2.03153°W	—	18th century	The milestone consists of a whitewashed sandstone block with incised lettering in black. It has a triangular plan and a curved top. The milestone shows the distances in miles to Chapel-en-le-Frith, Sheffield, Chesterfield, and Macclesfield.	II
Wellhead, Lyme Park; 53.33810°N 2.05473°W		18th century	The wellhead is Italian, and was moved from Venice in about 1900. It stands in the centre of the courtyard. The wellhead is in white marble, and stands on two hexagonal sandstone steps. It consists of six rectangular panels with a cornice; the panels contain armorial plaques and are inscribed with a poem in Latin.	II
Hamper's Bridge, Lyme Park; 53.33748°N 2.05012°W		1751	The bridge crosses a stream, and is built in sandstone. It consists of a single tall elliptical arch with a keystone. The bridge has a plain parapet with iron railings, and angled revetment walls.	II
Barn, Brookside Farm; 53.35774°N 2.06573°W		Late 18th century	The barn is built in brick on a sandstone plinth, and has an asbestos roof with a stone ridge and stone-coped gables. It is in two storeys and has a four-bay front. There are various openings, including ventilation holes and pitch holes.	II
Dark Passage, Lyme Park; 53.33825°N 2.05414°W	—	1815	The passage led from the house to the kitchen and to store rooms. It was designed by Lewis Wyatt, and is built in sandstone. It consists of a barrel vaulted passage leading to the kitchen, which has a rusticated doorcase with a semicircular head.	II
Orangery, Lyme Park; 53.33829°N 2.05372°W		1815	This was built as a conservatory designed by Lewis Wyatt, and has since had various uses. It was completed in 1862 by Alfred Darbyshire. The building is in sandstone, is in a single storey, and has a symmetrical eleven-bay front. The central three bays project forward and are canted. Across the front are mullioned and transomed windows, and at the top of the building is a balustrade.	II*
Terrace wall and steps, Lyme Park; 53.33805°N 2.05372°W	—	c. 1815	The terrace wall and steps were designed by Lewis Wyatt. They are in sandstone, the wall having square pilasters at the corners and along the wall. Along the wall is a moulded cornice with flat capstones. In the centre of the wall is a flight of twelve steps.	II
Bridge over Bollinhurst Brook; 53.35784°N 2.06598°W		Early 19th century	The bridge crosses a stream, and is built in sandstone. It consists of a single segmental arch, with a parapet and a cobbled roadway. Part of the bridge is in Greater Manchester.	II
Stables, Lyme Park; 53.33914°N 2.05302°W		1862–64	The stables were designed by Alfred Darbyshire, and are built in sandstone with Welsh slate roofs. They are in a courtyard plan, are in two storeys, and have a main front of nine bays. In the centre is a segmental-arched entrance with a ram's head keystone, above which is a triangular pediment on Doric pilasters. The windows have low segmental heads and carved keystones. Along the top of the stables is a modillion cornice.	II
Kennels, Lyme Park; 53.34113°N 2.04821°W	—	c. 1870	The kennels were built to house the Lyme Mastiffs. They are in sandstone with some brick, and have Welsh slate roofs. The building has an H-shaped plan, and consists of six kennels between cross-wings. Each kennel has a semicircular dog flap, with a yard in front of it, and beyond this is a rectangular paddock.	II
Pheasant House, Lyme Park; 53.34112°N 2.04898°W	—	c. 1870	The building is in sandstone with a pyramidal Welsh slate roof. It has a square plan, and is in a single storey. Around each side is a verandah carried on cast iron columns with stone bases.	II
Cottages, Lyme Park; 53.34001°N 2.05120°W		1871	A pair of cottages for gardeners. They are built in sandstone, and have a hipped roof in Welsh slate. The cottages are in a single storey, and have a symmetrical five-bay front, the second and fourth bays projecting forward. There is a central doorway with a porch in timber and glass. The windows are casements, and there are two triangular gabled dormers.	II
Stables and carthouse, Cornfields Farm; 53.32576°N 2.02312°W		Late 18th century	The stable and carthouse are in sandstone with Kerridge stone-slate roofs. They have a rectangular plan, are in two storeys, and have a six-bay front. The left four bays consist of two stables, and the right two bays are a carthouse having a segmental arched entrance with a keystone.	II
Meat Safe, Lyme Park; 53.33856°N 2.05386°W		Late 19th century	This was a building for hanging game. It is built in wood with an iron-bound frame, a lead roof, and it stands on steel saddle stones. The building has an octagonal lantern on the roof, and inside there are hooks for hanging the game.	II
Chestnut Cottages and estate workshops 53.34013°N 2.05830°W		1904	A group of houses and workshops for the estate workers, designed by C. H. Reilly in Vernacular Revival style. They are in two ranges, form an L-shaped plan, and are built in pebbledashed brick with tiled roofs. The east range has a symmetrical 13-bay front, the outer bays being in two storeys and the rest in one. There is a central doorway with a dormer and mansard roof above. The north range consists of a three-bay house, a five-bay former electricity generating shed, and a four-bay former boiler house and laundry.	II

== See also ==
- Listed buildings in Disley
- Listed buildings in Kettleshulme
- Listed buildings in Pott Shrigley
- Listed buildings in Poynton with Worth
- Listed buildings in Stockport
- Listed buildings in Whaley Bridge
