= Listed buildings in Kettleshulme =

Kettleshulme is a former civil parish in Cheshire East, England. It contained 18 buildings that are recorded in the National Heritage List for England as designated listed buildings. Of these, one is listed at Grade II*, the middle grade, and the others are at Grade II. Apart from the village of Kettleshulme, the parish was rural. Most of the listed buildings are houses, cottages, farmhouses, and farm cottages. The others are a former public house, a former mill, two bridges and a milestone.

== Key ==
Grade	Criteria
II*	Particularly important buildings of more than special interest
II	Buildings of national importance and special interest

== Buildings ==
Name and location	Photograph	Date	Notes	Grade
Wright's Farmhouse; 53.31120°N 2.00908°W	—	Early 17th century	A farmhouse that was altered in the 19th century. It is built in sandstone with a Kerridge stone slate roof and has a T-shaped plan. The farmhouse is in two storeys, and has a three-bay front. The central bay steps forward by one bay, and has a gable containing a semicircular-headed niche. The doorway is in the right bay. Inside the farmhouse is an inglenook.	II
Clayton Fold House; 53.31545°N 2.01036°W		Before 1629	A farmhouse that was later altered. It is built in sandstone with a Kerridge stone slate roof. The farmhouse is in two storeys, and has a three-bay front. The left side has a lean-to extension. The windows are mullioned, but some mullions are missing.	II
Barn and shippon, Wright's Farmhouse; 53.31163°N 2.00907°W	—	17th century	The farm buildings are in dry stone sandstone with a Kerridge stone slate roof and a stone ridge. They have a long rectangular plan and contain various openings, including a cart entrance, pitch holes and ventilation slots.	II
Gap House; 53.31927°N 2.00660°W		1662	A farmhouse in two ranges, the later range dated 1773, and with an extension of 1976. It is in sandstone, with a Kerridge stone slate roof at the front, and Welsh slate in the valley between the ridges. The farmhouse has a square plan, it is in two storeys, and has a three-bay symmetrical front. There is a semicircular-headed doorway with rusticated quoins and a fanlight. The windows are mainly sashes.	II
Barn, Gap House; 53.31958°N 2.00693°W	—	Late 17th century (probable)	The barn was later altered. It has a long rectangular plan, is in sandstone, with a Kerridge stone slate roof, and has two storeys. In the lower storey are a cart entrance and seven rectangular openings, and in the upper storey are three round pitch holes.	II
Colehurst Farmhouse; 53.32107°N 2.01397°W	—	1719	The farmhouse was altered and extended to the rear in the 20th century. It is built in sandstone with a composition tile roof. The farmhouse has a long rectangular plan, it is in two storeys, and has a three-bay south front. The doorway is in the left bay, and to the right are French doors and casement windows. Inside is an inglenook.	II
Well House Farmhouse; 53.31720°N 2.01814°W		18th century	This originated as a farmhouse, then became two cottages with an attached barn, and later it was used as farm buildings. It is built in sandstone with a Kerridge stone slate roof. The building has a long rectangular plan, is in two storeys, and the original farmhouse has a four-bay front. The windows are mullioned.	II
Dales Farmhouse and Dales Cottage; 53.31391°N 2.01962°W		Mid-18th century	Originating as a farmhouse and two cottages, this is built in sandstone with a Kerridge stone slate roof. It has a long rectangular plan, and is in two storeys. The farmhouse has a three-bay front, with casement windows in the lower floor, and horizontal sliding sash windows above with mullions. Each cottage is in two bays, and has mullioned windows.	II
Thorneycroft Farmhouse; 53.30915°N 2.02142°W		1752	A farmhouse that was modernised in about 1980. It is built in sandstone with a Kerridge stone slate roof and a stone ridge. The farmhouse has a double-pile plan, is in two storeys, and has a three-bay front. The doorway is approached by a flight of steps, and is round-headed with a prominent keystone. Some of the windows are mullioned, and contain casements.	II
The Bull's Head and cottages 53.31437°N 2.01894°W		Late 18th century	This consists of a public house (now closed) and three attached cottages. They are in sandstone with Kerridge stone slate roofs. The former public house is in two storeys and has a symmetrical three-bay front with a central doorway. Each of the cottages has a two-bay front, and two of them have attic windows. The windows are casements.	II
Ely Fold Cottages; 53.31572°N 2.01783°W	—	Late 18th century	A row of three cottages in sandstone with Kerridge stone slate roofs, and all in two storeys. The left cottage is the oldest and has a three-bay front. The windows are mullioned and contain sashes. The middle cottage is set forward, and has horizontal sliding sashes. The right house is set at right angles and has 20th-century windows.	II
Grove Mill (Lumb Hole Mill); 53.32031°N 2.01926°W		Late 18th century	A former candlewick mill, built in sandstone with a Kerridge stone slate roof. It was largely rebuilt in about 1830, and extended later. The original part of the mill is in three storeys, and has a nine-bay north front. On the south front is a gabled staircase tower with loading bays. Although the interior has been damaged by fire, it contains an iron overshot waterwheel, which is twinned with a condensing beam engine. The listing notes that it is "considered to be the last example of a mill where water-powered and steam machinery were used together and survive intact."	II*
Milestone; 53.31773°N 2.01309°W		Late 18th century	The milestone is in sandstone, and has a triangular plan and a shaped top. The painted inscriptions record the distances in miles to Chapel-en-le-Frith, Sheffield, Chesterfield, and Macclesfield. There is also an Ordnance Survey benchmark.	II
Road Bridge; 53.31075°N 2.02787°W		Late 18th century	The bridge carries a track over the Todd Brook, and was probably an accommodation bridge. It is smaller than Reed Bridge, built in sandstone and consists of a single segmental arch. It has low piers, a plain parapet and short wing walls.	II
Reed Bridge; 53.31086°N 2.02780°W		Late 18th century	The bridge carries the B5470 road over the Todd Brook. It is built in sandstone and consists of a single segmental arch. It has low piers, a plain parapet and short wing walls.	II
Paddock Lodge; 53.31444°N 2.01920°W		1823	This originated as a house that was later used as a post office, and after that became a house with a café. It is built in sandstone with a Kerridge stone slate roof. The building is in two storeys and has a three-bay front. In the centre is a gabled porch. The windows are casements.	II
Grove House and Grove Cottage; 53.32006°N 2.01892°W		c. 1830	This was originally the mill owner's house, and later converted into two dwellings. It is built in sandstone with a Kerridge stone slate roof and a stone ridge. The building is in two storeys and has a six-bay front. Some windows are fixed, the others are a mix of sashes and casements.	II
Glebe House; 53.31706°N 2.01713°W	—	1912	A sandstone house with a Kerridge stone slate roof. It was designed by Ernest Newton in Neo-Georgian style. The house is in two storeys and has a symmetrical three-bay front. Above the central doorway is a semicircular fanlight. The windows are mullioned.	II

== See also ==
- Listed buildings in Lyme Handley
- Listed buildings in Rainow
