= Newtown, Derbyshire =

Area in Derbyshire, England

Coordinates: 53.36°N 2.008°W

Newtown
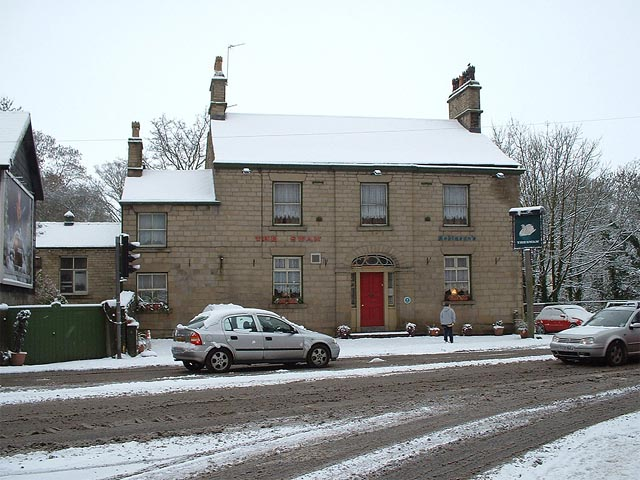
- The Swan public house in 2004, since closed

- Location within Derbyshire
- Civil parish: New Mills
- District: High Peak
- Shire county: Derbyshire
- Region: East Midlands
- Country: England
- Sovereign state: United Kingdom
- Post town: HIGH PEAK
- Postcode district: SK22
- Dialling code: 01663

Newtown is an area of New Mills in the High Peak of Derbyshire, England, south-west of the town centre on the road towards Disley. It lies beside the county boundary between Cheshire and Derbyshire.

== History ==
Newtown originally formed part of the parish of Disley and the county of Cheshire; most of it became part of Derbyshire under the Local Government Act 1888. On 31 December 1894, Newtown became a separate civil parish; subsequently, on 1 April 1934, the parish was abolished and merged with New Mills.

In 1931, the parish had a population of 1,421.

== Transport ==
Newtown is served by New Mills Newtown railway station, which is a stop on the Buxton line. There is generally one train per hour in each direction between Manchester Piccadilly and Buxton, via Stockport; trains run every two hours each way on Sundays.

Bus services are operated by Stagecoach Manchester and High Peak Buses. Routes connect the area with New Mills, Glossop, Hayfield, Macclesfield, Marple and Stockport.
