= Whitle =

Hamlet in Derbyshire, England

Coordinates: 53.377771°N 2.002675°W

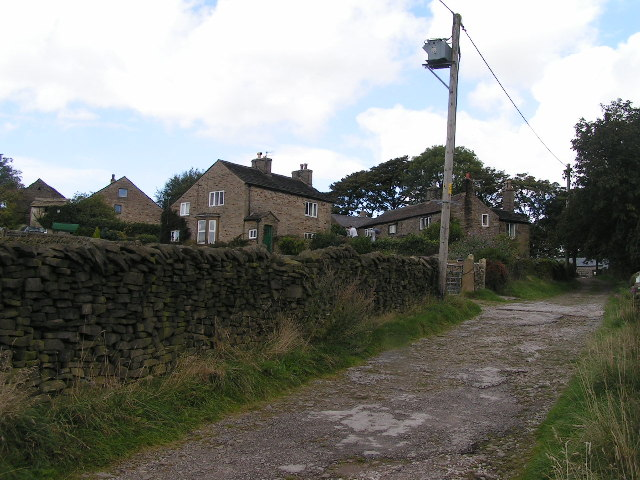
- Whitle from the south

- Location within Derbyshire
- OS grid reference: SK029866
- District: High Peak
- Shire county: Derbyshire
- Region: East Midlands
- Country: England
- Sovereign state: United Kingdom
- Post town: HIGH PEAK
- Postcode district: SK22
- Dialling code: 01663
- Police: Derbyshire
- Fire: Derbyshire
- Ambulance: East Midlands
- UK Parliament: High Peak

Whitle is a historic hamlet in Derbyshire. The Whitle area is now part of the town of New Mills, and lies between the centre of the town and the hamlet of Thornsett.

The main approach to the hamlet is via an unadopted road from the south, connecting with Apple Tree Road. This continues north-east as a public bridleway and private driveway to Mellor Road. Public footpaths lead north-west and WSW across New Mills Golf Course, which is immediately west of the hamlet.

== History ==
Whitle Inclosure Act 1826
- Act of Parliament
- Parliament of the United Kingdom
- Long title: An Act for dividing, allotting and inclosing the Commons or Waste Lands in the Hamlet of Whitley in the Parish of Glossop in the County of Derby.
- Citation: 7 Geo. 4. c. 4 Pr.

Dates
- Royal assent: 22 March 1826

The placename is thought to derive simply from "white hill". At one point, Whitle was part of the Lordship of Longdendale. In 1713 the hamlet was included in the newly formed township of New Mills and to this day it remains within the town's boundaries. The Whitle Inclosure Act 1826 (7 Geo. 4. c. 4 Pr.) refers to, and maps, four distinct areas within Whitle: New Mills Lee, Whitle Bank, Shaw Marsh and Broadhurst Edge.

By comparing maps and written records of the Whitle enclosure, Bryant shows that, in 1826, the area contained around 20 buildings. These buildings included "Stafford's Mill", "Barnes's Mill", a "Whitle School" (on the site of 41–45 Mellor Road) and also a "Poor House" (set back from the southeastern end of present-day Watford Road). Close to the Poor House a toll gate was sited on what is now known as Batemill Road.

All of the major surviving buildings in Whitle were Grade II listed in 1977: Whitle Farmhouse and its barn; Bower House and its barns; Fold House; Whitle Cottage; Hilltop Cottage; and Century Cottage, dated 1666.

== See also ==
- Listed buildings in New Mills
