= Bowstones =

The Bowstones
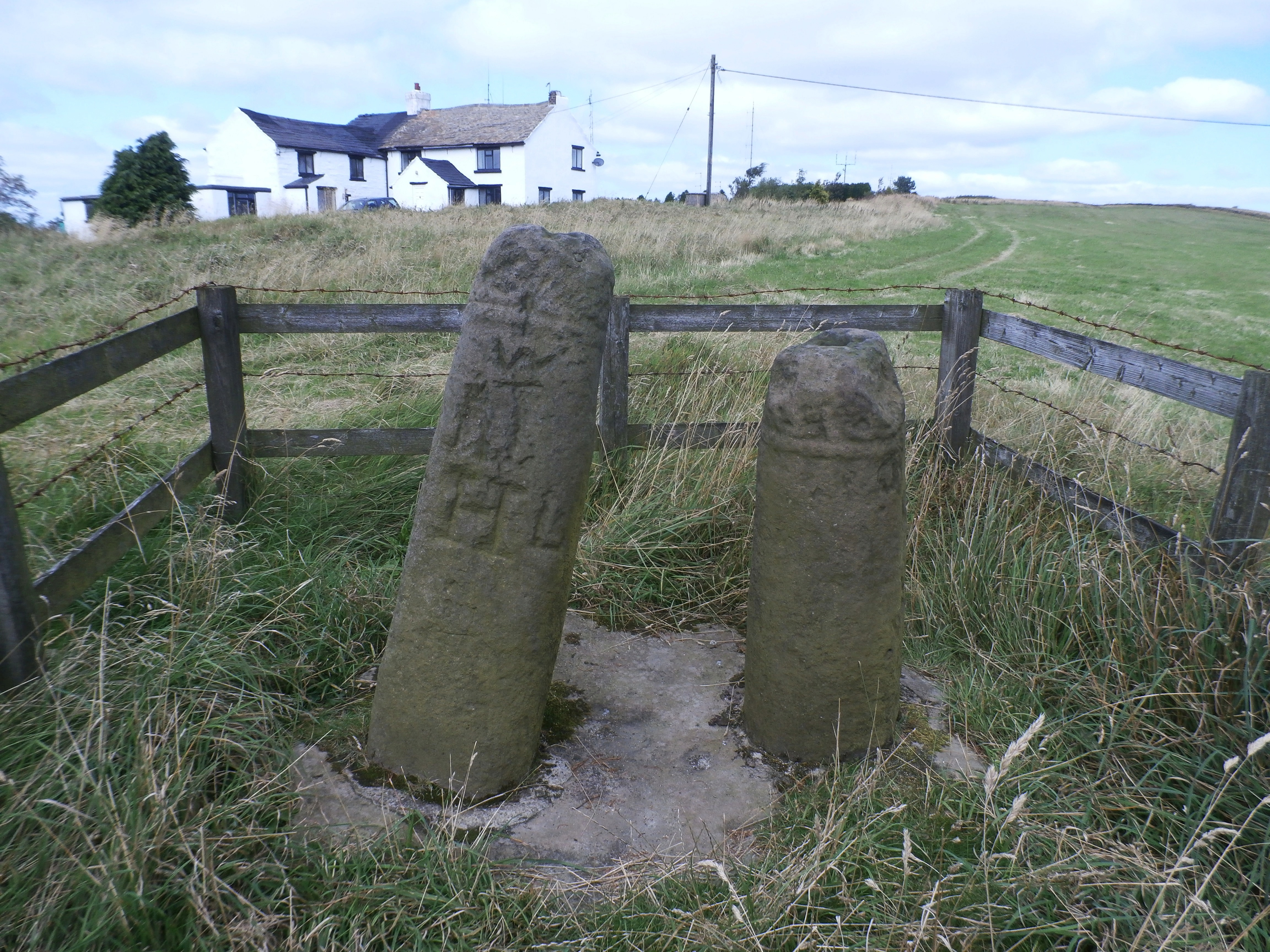
- Interactive map of The Bowstones
- Type: Anglian Cross Shafts
- Coordinates: 53.32865°N 2.04073°W
- Built: 10th century or earlier

Scheduled monument
- Official name: The Bow Stones Anglian cross shafts
- Designated: 23 September 1958
- Reference no.: 1011116

The Bowstones or Bow Stones are a pair of Anglian cross shafts in Cheshire, England. Situated beside the old ridgeway between Disley and Macclesfield, overlooking Lyme Park, the Cheshire Plain, the city of Manchester and the hills of the Peak District, they are a scheduled monument.

The western shaft is 1.22 metres (4 ft 0 in) high and tapers from circumference of 1.25 m (4 ft 1 in) at the base to 0.86 m (2 ft 10 in) at the top. The eastern shaft is 0.98 m (3 ft 3 in) high and has a circumference of 1.27 m (4 ft 2 in). Both are decorated with interlaced carvings in a style indicating a date of the 10th century or earlier. There is some later lettering engraved. Their round cross section and their erection as a pair is unusual for crosses of this era. They may have been moved to their current location in the 16th century by Sir Piers Legh of Lyme Hall. Two stone cross heads on display at the hall may have originally surmounted the shafts.

Local legend states that the name is derived from their use by Robin Hood and his men to re-string their bows.

Their location on a prominent ridgeline on the edge of the Peak District National Park with extensive views, near to the popular visitor attraction of Lyme Park and by the crossing of several public footpaths (including the Gritstone Trail) and a minor road make them a well-visited site.

== Other sources ==
- Marshall, Susan (1975). "The Bow Stones of Lyme Handley, Cheshire". Transactions of the Lancashire and Cheshire Antiquarian Society. 78: 65–74.
- Browne, Rev. G. F. (1887). "Brief Precis of the Description of the Early Sculptured Stones of Cheshire". Archaeological Journal. 44 (1): 146–156. doi:10.1080/00665983.1887.10852260.
