= Disley =

Village in Cheshire, England

Coordinates: 53.357°N 2.043°W

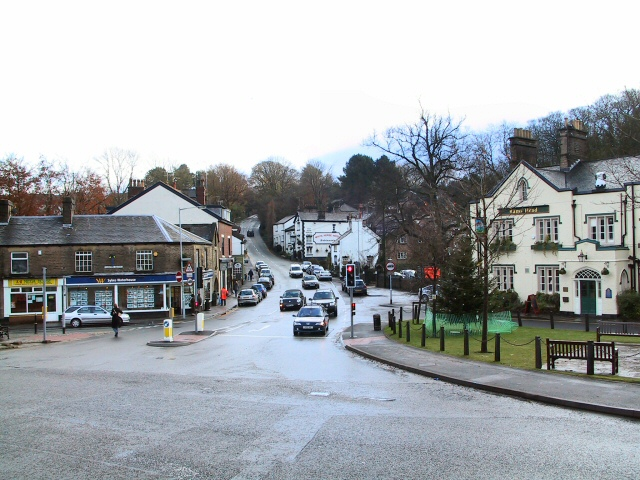
- Disley village centre

- Location within Cheshire
- Population: 4,294 (2011)
- OS grid reference: SJ972845
  - London: 186 miles (299 km)
- Civil parish: Disley
- Unitary authority: Cheshire East
- Ceremonial county: Cheshire
- Region: North West
- Country: England
- Sovereign state: United Kingdom
- Post town: STOCKPORT
- Postcode district: SK12
- Dialling code: 01663
- Police: Cheshire
- Fire: Cheshire
- Ambulance: North West
- UK Parliament: Macclesfield

Disley is a village and civil parish in Cheshire, England, on the edge of the Peak District in the Goyt Valley, south of Stockport and close to the county boundary with Derbyshire at New Mills. The population at the 2011 Census was 4,294. To the north, the River Goyt and the Peak Forest Canal, which opened in 1800, pass along the edge of the village. Today, it is a commuter town, retaining a semi-rural character.

The parish includes part of the neighbouring area of Newtown.

== History ==
Its Anglo-Saxon name was Dystiglegh, meaning "wood or clearing by a mound" or possibly "windy settlement". In the 13th century, in the time of Edward I, there are references to confirmatory grants of land made to Jordan de Dystelegh of Disley Hall and Roger de Stanley-de-Dystelegh of Stanley Hall in the district, pointing to even older local settlements. It later had the name Dystelegh.

Disley was the home of several farmsteads, including one at Stanley, where the golf club is now located. The barn, erected sometime around the 15th or 16th-century, still stands.

Sir Piers Legh of Lyme founded St Mary's Church, completed in 1524 and consecrated as parish church in 1558. The earliest parish register is from 1591.

In 1724, the road from Manchester to Buxton became a turnpike road and in the early 1800s the road was rerouted from its original route along Jackson's Edge road to the current line of the A6.

At the time of the first census, Disley had a population of 995 residents. By 1881, this had increased to 3,312 and, as of 2019, the population is now in the region of 4,600.

The fountain in Fountain Square was donated by the Orfords in 1837 to provide the village with clean water, the stone coming from the Jacksons Edge Quarry. It was used until the 1920s.

The village had at least one cotton mill by the mid-19th century. As the cotton industry declined, more varied employment became the norm. As of 2005, there is a paper mill and some light engineering works, but most people travel out to work.

== Governance ==
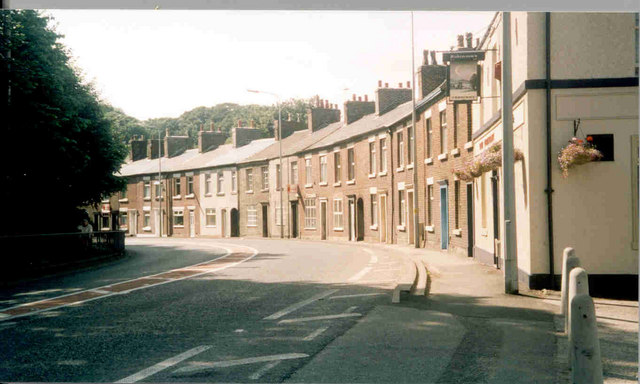
The Crescent, Disley in 2000

The parish of Disley was included in the 19th-century as one of three parishes in Hayfield rural sanitary district, alongside Hayfield and Mellor in Derbyshire. In 1894, under the Local Government Act 1894, rural sanitary districts became rural districts, but were required to be entirely within one county or another – this led to Disley, the only Cheshire parish of the sanitary district, to form the Disley Rural District on its own – one of only a few single-parish rural districts to exist. This remained in existence until 1974, when it was merged into the new Borough of Macclesfield, whilst retaining a parish council.

In April 2008, a referendum was announced for Disley residents because the Borough of Macclesfield was to become part of the new Cheshire East unitary authority, as a result of major local government changes in Cheshire in April 2009. Some residents believed that the village would be better served if it were part of the neighbouring boroughs of Stockport in Greater Manchester or High Peak in Derbyshire. On 8 May 2008, this referendum was held, with an overwhelming result in favour of staying within Cheshire; less than a third of electors wished to become part of the Metropolitan Borough of Stockport and an even lower proportion of the population wished the village to become part of High Peak Borough. Macclesfield Borough Council was succeeded on 1 April 2009 by the new unitary authority of Cheshire East.

== Transport ==
Disley railway station is a stop on the Manchester to Buxton line. There is generally an hourly service in each direction between Manchester Piccadilly and Buxton, via Stockport; services reduce to every two hours on Sundays.

High Peak Buses operates bus route 199, which provides a regular service between Buxton, New Mills, Stockport and Manchester Airport.

The A6, which connects Carlisle in Cumbria with Luton in Bedfordshire, passes through Disley; it connects the village with Stockport to the north-west and the Peak District to the south-east.

== Places of interest ==
The Rams Head Inn, in the centre of the village, was built by the Legh family in c.1640, though the current exterior was built around 1840. It was formerly a lodge belonging to the Lyme Park estate. It became a main coaching stop on the Manchester to London route. In 1790, after three visits, Viscount Torrington voted it the best inn in England. The Rams Head is now a restaurant and pub; only part of what once was its extensive stabling block still remains. The pub and its adjoining former stables are Grade II listed buildings.

Lyme Park is in the civil parish of Lyme Handley, rather than in the Disley parish, but it is sufficiently close to be associated with the village. It is owned and managed by the National Trust. The hall was used by the BBC as a setting in its 1995 adaptation of Pride and Prejudice.

The Bowstones are two upright crosses on moorland above Lyme Park on the route of the Gritstone Trail. Their origins are unknown but they are believed to be religious. From here it is possible to see seven counties: Derbyshire, Lancashire, Yorkshire, Cheshire, Staffordshire, Shropshire and Clwyd.

The village is home to Disley Cricket Club, a member of the TACS Cheshire Cricket League, playing their home games at Disley Amalgamated Sports Club (DASC). The 1st XI play in Division 1, having won the Division 2 championship in 2014 and Division 3 in 2013.

Moorside Golf Club, in Higher Disley, first appeared in the 1930s; it continued to operate until the late 1950s. Disley Golf Club, still in operation to the north of the village, opened in 1889 and is "one of the oldest inland courses in the UK".

Stanley Hall Farmhouse is a Grade-II-listed building from the 16th-century. Stanley Hall was given to the Stanleys by the Black Prince in 1388 and bought by the Leghs in 1488. Part of the barn, also Grade II listed, was used as the first clubhouse of the Disley golf club.

== Education ==
Disley has a primary school, Disley Primary School, which in 2020 became an academy as part of The TRUE Learning Partnership, and two nurseries, Blue Grass Purple Cow and Disley Under Fives.

== Notable people ==
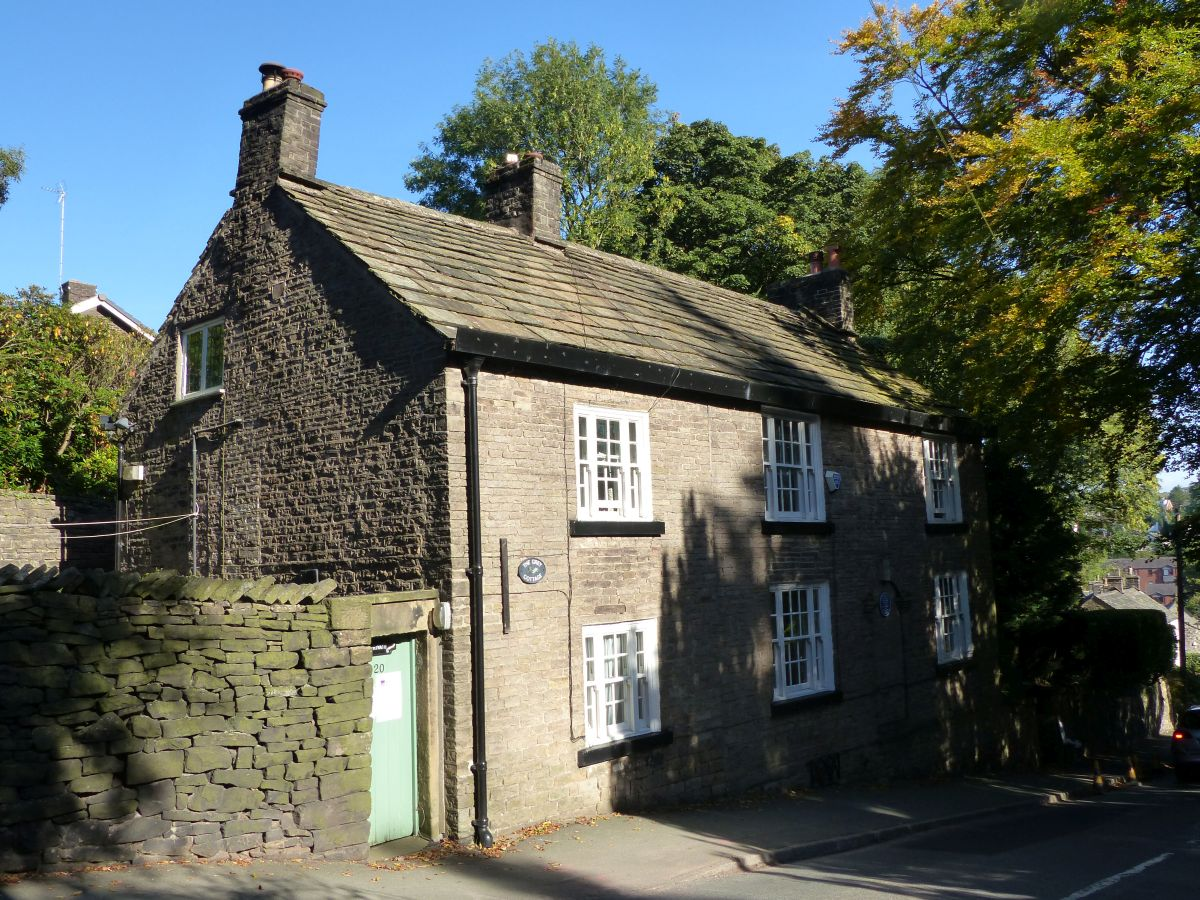
The Grey Cottage, where Allan Monkhouse lived from 1893 to 1902

- Piers Legh (1389–1422), second generation of the Leghs of Lyme, soldier injured at the Battle of Agincourt and whose dog, a mastiff, stood over him and protected him for many hours before returning to Lyme Park
- Thomas Brown (1772–1850), surveyor, civil engineer, businessman and landowner.
- Allan Monkhouse (1858–1936), playwright, critic, essayist and journalist; lived locally.
- Christopher Isherwood (1904–1986), novelist, playwright, screenwriter and autobiographer; born at Wyberslegh Hall.
- A. J. P. Taylor (1906–1990), historian, journalist and broadcaster, lived in the village in the 1930s.
- Molly Clutton-Brock (1912–2013), therapist and youth worker, helped physically disabled children in centres in Rhodesia and Botswana.
- Barney Storey (born 1977), cyclist, medallist at the 2008 and 2012 Paralympic Games.
- Dame Sarah Storey (born 1977), cyclist and swimmer, multiple gold medallist in the Paralympic Games.
- Ian Clark (born ca. 1980), film director and screenwriter, brought up locally.

== See also ==
- Listed buildings in Disley
