= Torr Vale Mill =

Cotton mill in Derbyshire, England

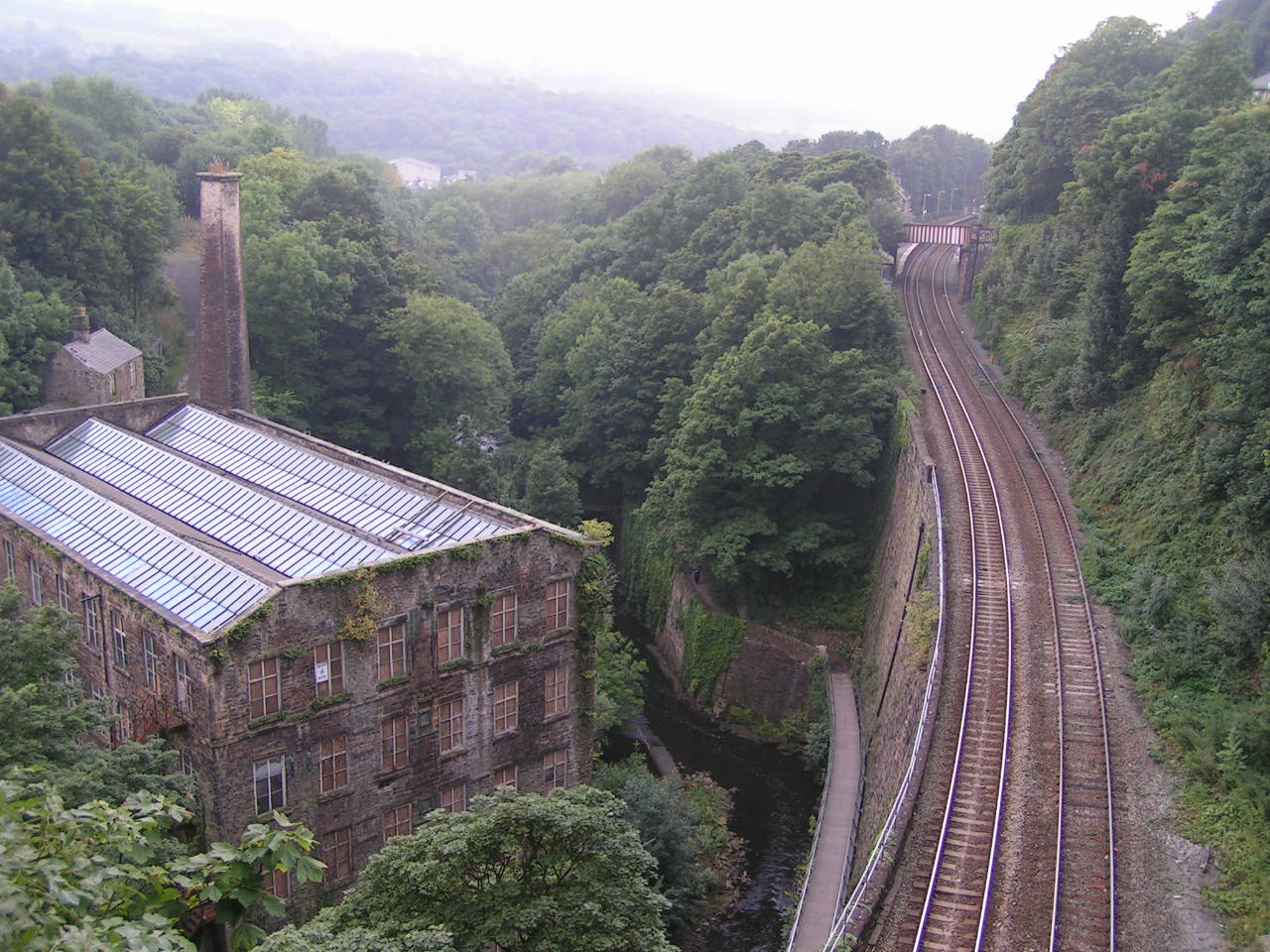
- Torr Vale Mill, alongside The River Goyt, Millennium Walkway and Hope Valley Line

- Location in the Borough of High Peak

Spinning Weaving (Watermill)
- Location: New Mills, Derbyshire, England
- Serving canal: Peak Forest Canal
- Serving railway: Hope Valley Line
- Coordinates: 53.3648°N 2.0032°W

Construction
- Built: 1790
- Floor count: 5
- Floor area: 800 square metres (8,600 sq ft)

Water Power
- Wheels: 2 (decommissioned)

Equipment

Listed Building – Grade II*
- Official name: Torr Vale Mill, attached weir, sluice gates, watercourse walls, headrace arches, retaining walls and steps
- Designated: 23 February 1998
- Reference no.: 1119721

Torr Vale Mill is a Grade II* listed former cotton mill located in New Mills, Derbyshire, England, on a small rocky outcrop at the bottom of the Torrs gorge in a bend of the River Goyt.

The mill was built in the late 1780s by Daniel Strafford and was known as Strafford's Mill. It was powered by two waterwheels to spin and weave cotton. It was rebuilt in 1856 and a steam engine was added. It continued to be driven by steam and water till the 1940s when electricity took over. It was still in use producing towelling products until December 2000, the longest continuous period of cotton production in the UK. Since 1998 there have been various plans by the new owner, Chemquip Ltd., to renovate and develop the mill. This is now well underway and the new events floor has been used extensively by the community for a wide range of events. The Torr Vale Mill Preservation Trust in May 2001 and The Princes Regeneration Trust has also been seeking a solution.

In 2000 Torr Vale Mill was depicted on Royal Mail postage stamps to commemorate the Millennium Walkway in the Torrs Gorge. From this walkway, on the opposite side of the Gorge, dramatic views of the Mill may be had. In 2001 a fire destroyed one of the buildings of the mill.

The mill is on the English Heritage Heritage at Risk Register of listed buildings at risk, though as of 2026 the trend was said to be "improving".

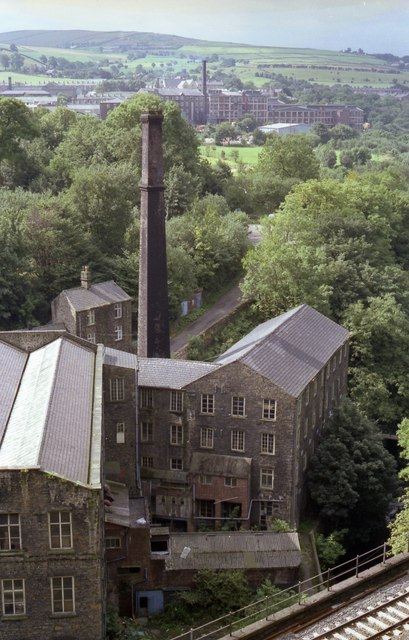
Torr Vale Mill in 1982, when the mill was still in use.
