= Lyme Handley =

Former civil parish in Cheshire, England

Coordinates: 53.339°N 2.054°W

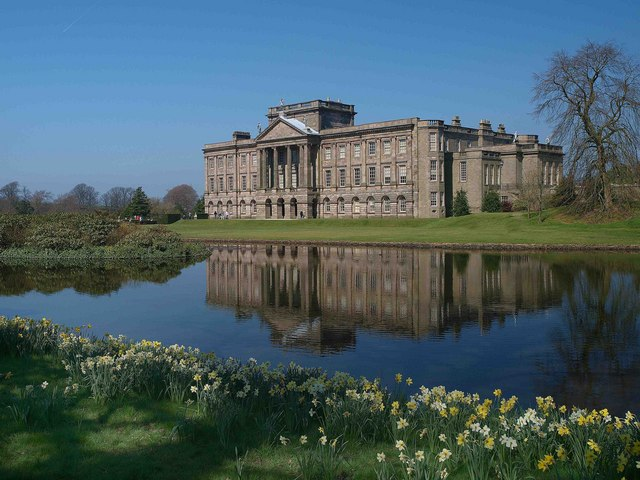
- Lyme Hall and lake

- Location within Cheshire
- Population: 151 (2001 census)
- OS grid reference: SJ965825
- Civil parish: Kettleshulme and Lyme Handley
- Unitary authority: Cheshire East
- Ceremonial county: Cheshire
- Region: North West
- Country: England
- Sovereign state: United Kingdom
- Post town: STOCKPORT
- Postcode district: SK23
- Dialling code: 01663
- Police: Cheshire
- Fire: Cheshire
- Ambulance: North West
- UK Parliament: Macclesfield

Lyme Handley, sometimes known as Lyme, is a former civil parish, now in the parish of Kettleshulme and Lyme Handley, in between Disley and Stockport, in the unitary authority area of Cheshire East and the ceremonial county of Cheshire, England. According to the 2001 census, it had a population of 151.

It is also greenbelt area on the suburbs of Greater Manchester, attracting many visitors in the summer months for walking and picnics and in winter for sledging. The most famous feature of Lyme is Lyme Park, a Tudor house with gardens created in the 1720s. This was made most famous when it featured as Mr Darcy's house in the BBC dramatisation of Pride and Prejudice. The three-storey house has 17 acres (69,000 m^{2}) of well-maintained Victorian era gardens and is also open to visitors for guided tours of the house, which contains a large collection of English clocks.

The rest of the area consists of small farms which were all once part of the Handley estate but parcelled off at the turn of the 20th century. These mostly farm sheep with some cattle. In the past Lyme Handley had its own flax mill, providing a use for a crop other than grass that could be grown on a relatively infertile soil type; although the mill remains, it is no longer functional.

== History ==
Lyme Handley was formerly a township in the parish of Prestbury, from 1866 Lyme Handley was a civil parish in its own right, on 1 April 2023 the parish was abolished and merged with Kettleshulme to form "Kettleshulme and Lyme Handley".

== See also ==
- Listed buildings in Lyme Handley
