= New Mills Newtown railway station =

Railway station in Derbyshire, England

New Mills Newtown
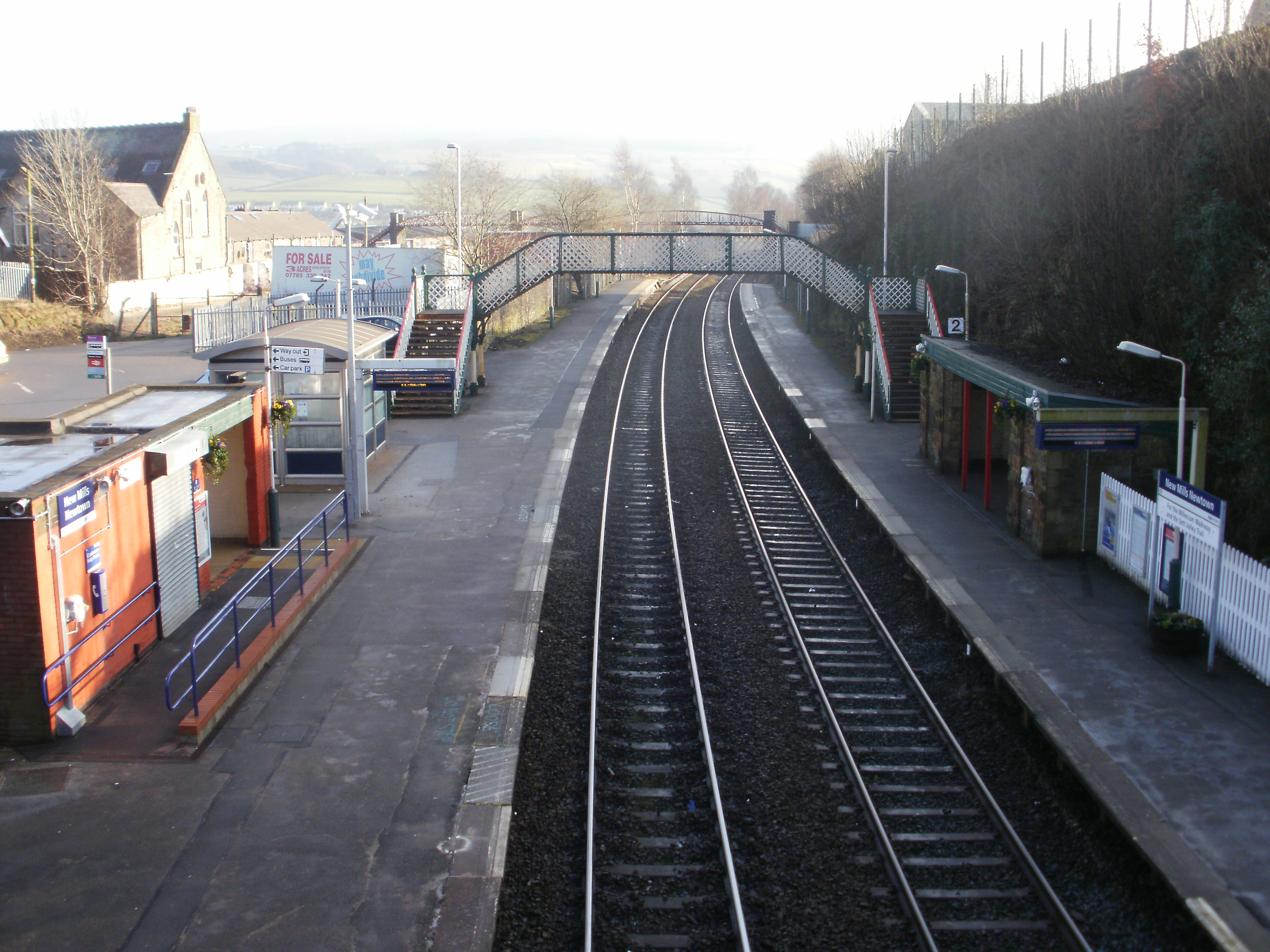
- The station in 2009

General information
- Location: Newtown, New Mills, High Peak, England
- Coordinates: 53.360°N 2.009°W
- Grid reference: SJ995847
- Manager: Northern Trains
- Platforms: 2

Other information
- Station code: NMN
- Classification: DfT category E

History
- Opened: 1857

Passengers
- 2020/21: ▼61,368
- 2021/22: ▲0.132 million
- 2022/23: ▲0.135 million
- 2023/24: ▲0.159 million
- 2024/25: ▲0.212 million
Location
Notes
- Passenger statistics from the Office of Rail and Road

New Mills Newtown railway station serves the Newtown area of New Mills, in Derbyshire, England. It is located 14 1/4 miles (22.9 km) south-east of Manchester Piccadilly on the Buxton line. It also serves as an interchange with the Hope Valley Line, with New Mills Central being 15 minutes' walk away across the Goyt Valley.

== History ==
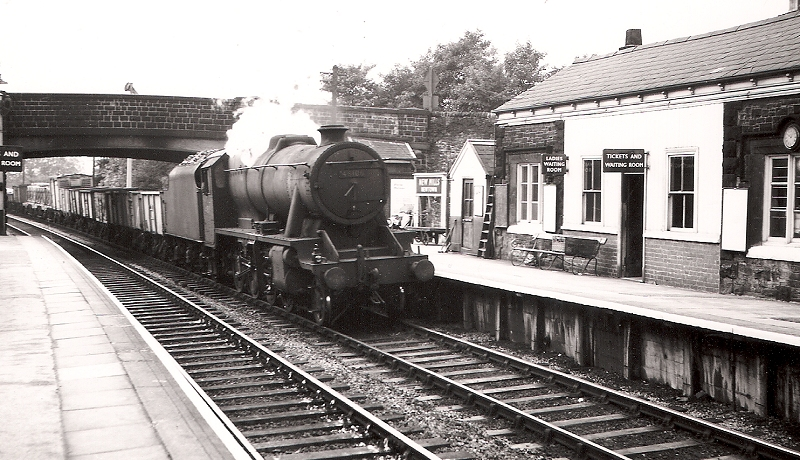
A steam train waits at the station (1959)

The station was built in 1857 on the Stockport, Disley and Whaley Bridge Railway line, which was extended by the London and North Western Railway (LNWR) in 1863 to connect with the Cromford and High Peak Railway and run to Buxton.

New Mills Newtown had quite a substantial goods yard, including an elevated signal box of LNWR type 5/6 design, a large three-storey warehouse including basement, and a crane and wharf; these were all built by the LNWR. Recently, the last remaining evidence of this goods yard was demolished; these were the stables for what were meant to be the railway's horses, but ended up being used for many other horses in New Mills.

There is also a three-span wrought-iron footbridge that connects Redmoor to its other half; the end of which has steps leading down to the children's park on Chapel Street. This is built on five brick columns, which support a three-span bridge because one end is held by the steps and the other is supported by the Chalkers Snooker Club embankment. The others are in close alignment holding an otherwise flimsy thin iron bridge.

== Facilities ==
The station has retained its booking office, on platform 1, which is normally staffed from 06:40 to 13:10 on weekdays only. There are also ticket machines and waiting shelters on both platforms, with train running information on passenger information system boards and announcements. Step-free access is available to both platforms, which are also linked by a pedestrian footbridge.

== Services ==
There is generally one train per hour between Manchester Piccadilly and Buxton, via Stockport; trains run every two hours each way on Sundays.

| Preceding station | National Rail | Following station |
|---|---|---|
| Furness Vale | Northern Buxton line | Disley |
