= Steel Cotton Rail Trail =

Footpath in the Peak District, England

The Steel Cotton Rail Trail
- Logo
- Length: 95 km (59 mi)
- Location: Peak District, England
- Established: 27 September 2025; 11 months ago
- Trailheads: Sheffield; Manchester
- Use: Hiking
- Highest point: Kinder Scout, 533 m (1,749 ft)
- Season: All year
- Website: peakdistrictbytrain.org/the-steel-cotton-rail-trail/
Trail map

The Steel Cotton Rail Trail is a linear 95 km (59 mi) long-distance footpath in England, through the Peak District. The trail runs from Sheffield station to Manchester Piccadilly station, following the Hope Valley Line. It is split into 14 legs, each starting and finishing at a railway station. In the first half of the 20th century, workers from "Steel City" Sheffield and "Cottonopolis" Manchester escaped their polluted cities to reach the clean air of the Peak District, travelling by train on the Hope Valley Line.

The trail was launched on 27 September 2025, the anniversary of the opening of the first passenger railway – Stockton and Darlington – on 27 September 1825.

== Route ==
Leg	Start	Finish	Distance	Total
1	Sheffield	Dore & Totley	8.0 km (5.0 mi)	8 km (5 mi)
2	Dore & Totley	Grindleford	10.1 km (6.3 mi)	18 km (11 mi)
3	Grindleford	Hathersage	4.0 km (2.5 mi)	22 km (14 mi)
4	Hathersage	Bamford	5.6 km (3.5 mi)	28 km (17 mi)
5	Bamford	Hope	3.9 km (2.4 mi)	32 km (20 mi)
6	Hope	Edale	12.0 km (7.5 mi)	44 km (27 mi)
7	Edale	Chinley	12.9 km (8.0 mi)	57 km (35 mi)
8	Chinley	New Mills	7.0 km (4.3 mi)	64 km (39 mi)
9	New Mills	Strines	3.5 km (2.2 mi)	67 km (42 mi)
10	Strines	Marple	5.2 km (3.2 mi)	72 km (45 mi)
11	Marple	Romiley	4.0 km (2.5 mi)	76 km (47 mi)
12	Romiley	Hyde Central	6.6 km (4.1 mi)	83 km (51 mi)
13	Hyde Central	Guide Bridge	3.5 km (2.2 mi)	86 km (54 mi)
14	Guide Bridge	Manchester	9.0 km (5.6 mi)	95 km (59 mi)
