= Woodley railway station =

Railway station in Greater Manchester, England

Coordinates: 53°25′46″N 2°5′34″W

Woodley
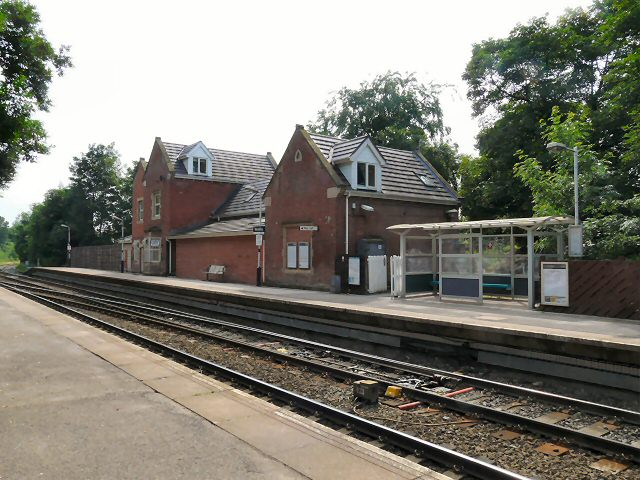
- Woodley railway station in 2009

General information
- Location: Woodley, Stockport; England
- Grid reference: SJ939925
- Manager: Northern Trains
- Transit authority: Greater Manchester
- Platforms: 2

Other information
- Station code: WLY
- Classification: DfT category F2

History
- Opened: 1862

Passengers
- 2021/22: ▲40,892
- 2022/23: ▲42,144
- 2023/24: ▲43,856
- 2024/25: ▲50,970
- 2025/26: ▲51,396
Location
Notes
- Passenger statistics from the Office of Rail and Road

Woodley railway station serves the suburb of Woodley in Stockport, Greater Manchester, England. The station is 9 1/4 miles (14.9 km) east of Manchester Piccadilly on a branch of the Hope Valley Line to Rose Hill Marple. It is situated where the A560 road from Stockport to Gee Cross, near Hyde, crosses over the railway line.

== History ==
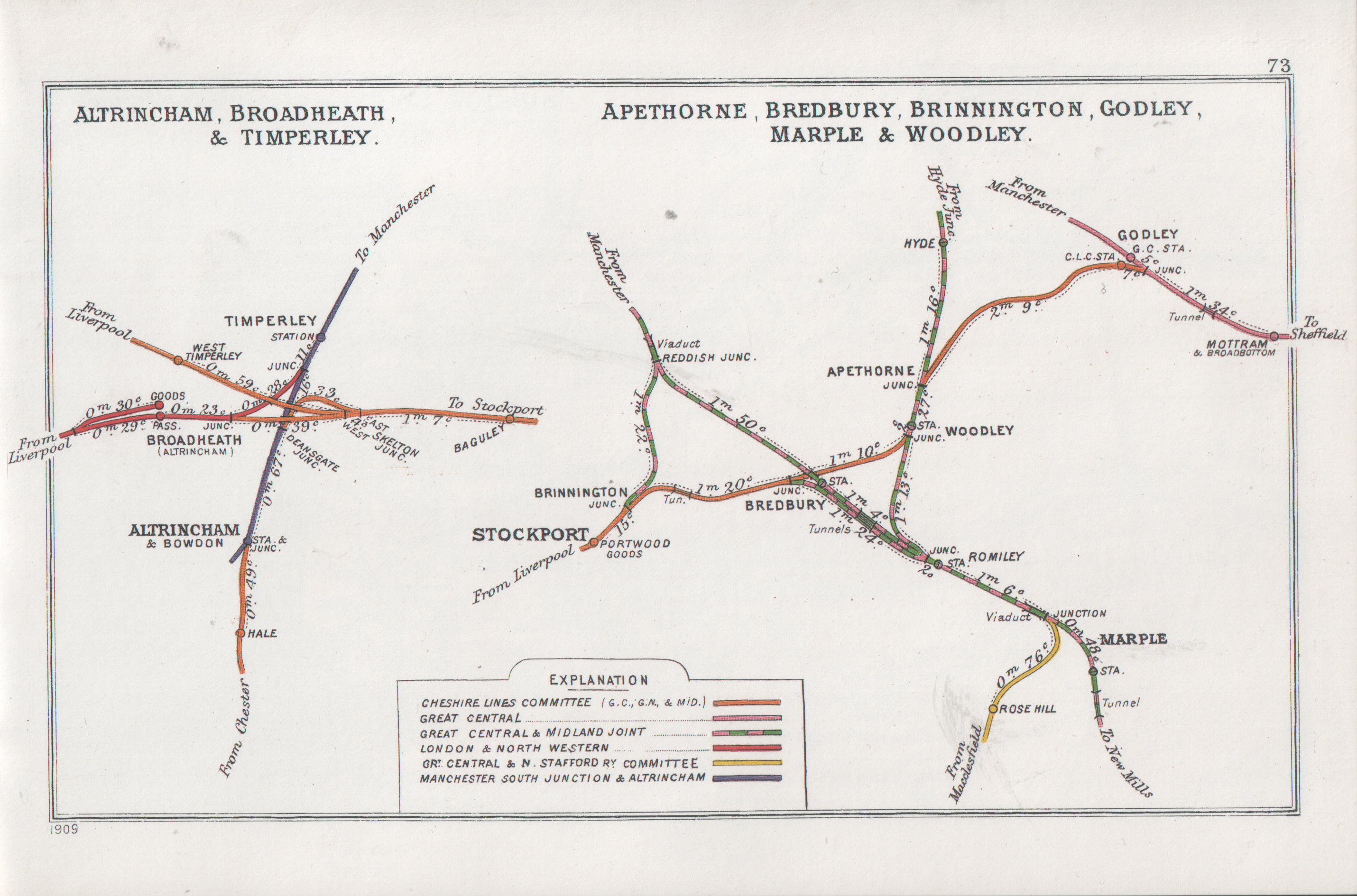
A Railway Clearing House map of the Woodley area, dating from 1909, showing the station and junction layout at Woodley

The station was opened on 5 August 1862 by the Manchester, Sheffield and Lincolnshire Railway; it became a junction later when a line from Stockport Tiviot Dale, the Stockport and Woodley Junction Railway, reached the suburb in 1865. The station subsequently became jointly owned and operated by the MS&L, Great Northern Railway and Midland Railway, as part of the Cheshire Lines Committee system.

From 1866, a second link from Apethorne Junction to the north gave an east-facing link to the Woodhead Line, at Godley Junction; it was used heavily for many years by trans-Pennine freight traffic, mainly coal from the South Yorkshire coalfields to Fiddlers Ferry power station.

In 1909, the railway line from Hyde through Woodley to Romiley and Marple was owned by the Great Central and Midland Joint Railway. The line from Stockport Tiviot Dale through Woodley was owned by the Cheshire Lines Committee.

The Stockport route closed to passengers in January 1967, although a short section at the eastern end remains in use today for goods traffic, serving a Tarmac stone terminal and waste recycling plant at Bredbury.

The Apethorne link was closed in 1982, soon after the Woodhead route itself, and is now a shared-use path.

In July 2020, Northern Trains informed local residents that services between Manchester and Rose Hill Marple would not operate between early-September and mid-December 2020; this was due to the train operating company's staff shortages from the effects of the COVID-19 pandemic. This left Woodley, along with Rose Hill Marple, Hyde North and Hyde Central, without a train service for around four months. Regular services have been restored since.

== Facilities ==
The station is unstaffed. Service information is offered via automated announcements, digital display screens, an induction loop and timetable posters. Step-free access to both platforms is available directly from Hyde Road; a stepped footbridge connects the two platforms.

The station building on the northbound platform is now a private dwelling; next to it is a small car park with five spaces available for rail users. Waiting shelters are present on both sides.

== Services ==
Northern Trains' typical service is two trains per hour in each direction between Manchester Piccadilly and Rose Hill Marple, via the Hyde loop, with a reduced evening service. There is no service on Sundays. A normal service operates on bank holidays.

Preceding station	National Rail	Following station
Romiley	Northern Trains; Hope Valley Line; Mondays-Saturdays only	Hyde Central

== Sources ==
- Butt, R. V. J. (October 1995). The Directory of Railway Stations: details every public and private passenger station, halt, platform and stopping place, past and present (1st ed.). Sparkford: Patrick Stephens Ltd. ISBN 978-1-85260-508-7. OCLC 60251199. OL 11956311M.
- Marshall, J (1981) Forgotten Railways North-West England, David & Charles (Publishers) Ltd, Newton Abbott. ISBN 0-7153-8003-6
