= Grindleford railway station =

Railway station in Derbyshire, England

Coordinates: 53.306°N 1.626°W

Grindleford
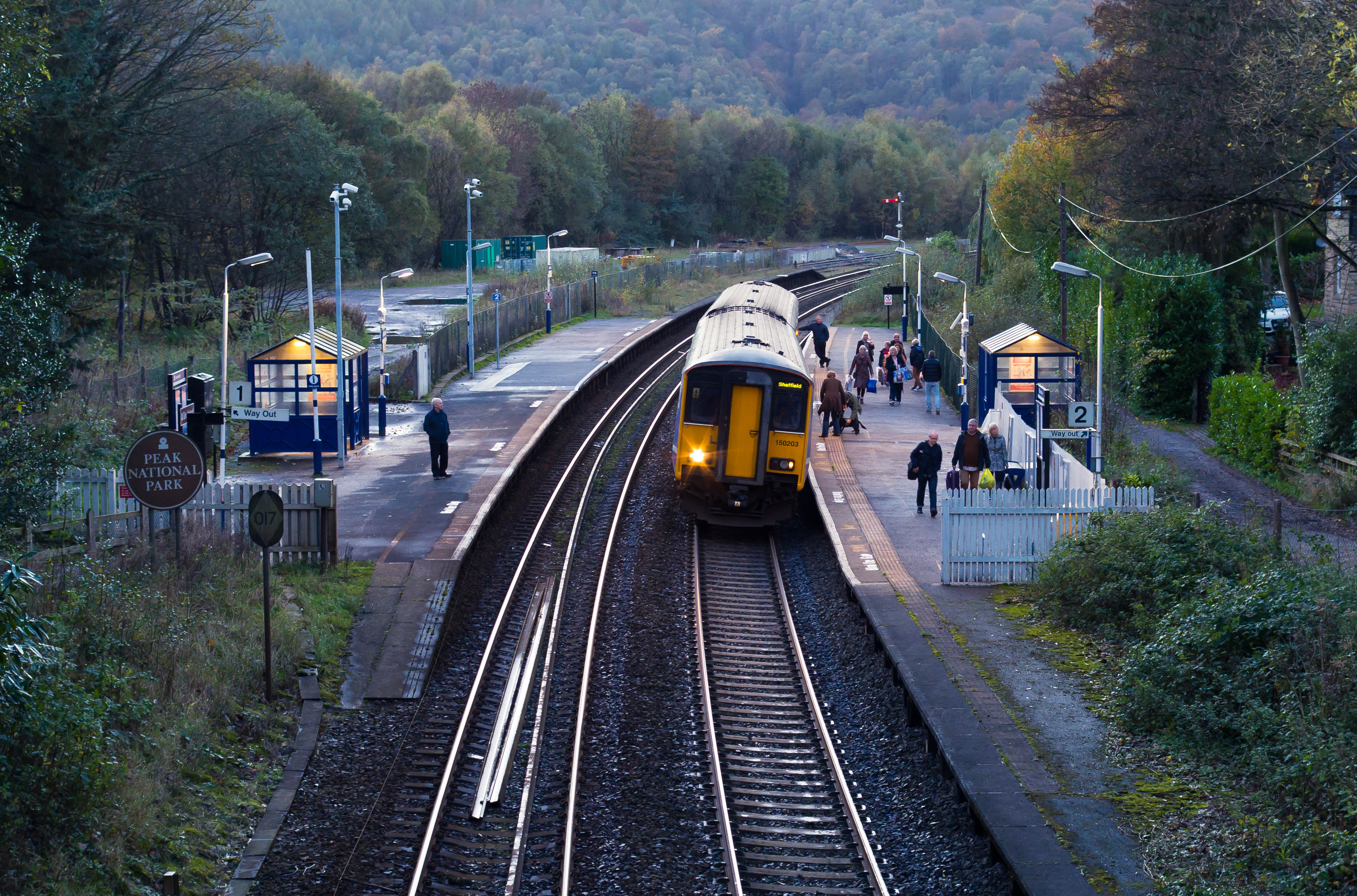
- A Northern service heading from Manchester to Sheffield

General information
- Location: Grindleford, Derbyshire Dales; England
- Grid reference: SK249788
- Managed by: Northern Trains
- Platforms: 2

Other information
- Station code: GRN
- Classification: DfT category F2

History
- Opened: 1894

Passengers
- 2020/21: ▼22,114
- 2021/22: ▲93,622
- 2022/23: ▼79,656
- 2023/24: ▲110,382
- 2024/25: ▲126,460
Location
Notes
- Passenger statistics from the Office of Rail and Road

Grindleford railway station serves the village of Grindleford in the Derbyshire Peak District, England. It is located 1 mile (1.6 km) away from the village centre in Nether Padley. The station is a stop on the Hope Valley Line between Manchester Piccadilly and Sheffield.

== History ==
It was opened in 1894 on the Midland Railway's Dore and Chinley line (now the Hope Valley Line), at the western entrance to the Totley Tunnel.

The line opened up the previously isolated valley to day-trippers to Padley Gorge and commuters from Sheffield, and the transport of stone from the local quarries. The station buildings are still standing and now house a well-known café.

=== Stationmasters ===
- Samuel Hart 1896 - 1902 (afterwards station master at Chinley Junction)
- Harry l’Anson 1902 - 1907 (afterwards station master at Bakewell)
- Samuel Smithurst 1907 -1932 (formerly station master at Killamarsh)
- R.J. Dowthwaite from 1932 (also station master at Hathersage)

== Facilities ==
The station is unstaffed and had no ticket provision until 2018; however, Northern has now installed ticket vending machines and made the intermediate stations between New Mills Central and Sheffield part of a penalty fare scheme.

Standard waiting shelters are provided on both platforms and train running information is offered via CIS displays, automated announcements, a pay phone and timetable posters. Step-free access is available for westbound trains only (platform 1), as the ramps to the bridge linking the platforms are steep and not suitable for wheelchairs.

== Service ==
The typical off-peak service from the station is one train per hour in each direction between Sheffield and Manchester Piccadilly.

On Sundays, services begin mid-morning and continue at hourly intervals during the day.

Trains to Sheffield take around 15 minutes; the journey to Manchester Piccadilly takes about an hour. Services are provided by Northern Trains.

East Midlands Railway's Nottingham to Liverpool service calls here with the first service of the day and also on the final return working.

Preceding station	National Rail	Following station
Dore & Totley	Northern Trains Hope Valley Line	Hathersage
Dore & Totley	East Midlands Railway Liverpool-Nottingham Limited service	Hathersage
