= Ryder Brow railway station =

Railway station in Greater Manchester, England

Coordinates: 53°27′25″N 2°10′26″W

Ryder Brow
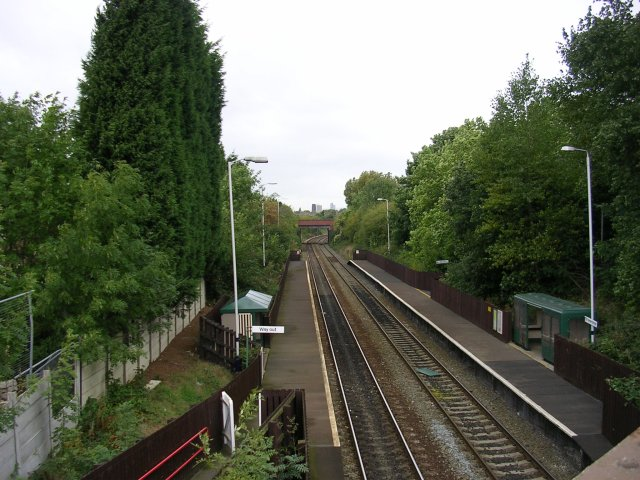
- Ryder Brow railway station in 2005

General information
- Location: Gorton, Manchester; England
- Grid reference: SJ885955
- Manager: Northern Trains
- Transit authority: Transport for Greater Manchester
- Platforms: 2

Other information
- Station code: RRB
- Classification: DfT category F2

History
- Opened: November 1985

Passengers
- 2021/22: ▲16,476
- 2022/23: ▲16,760
- 2023/24: ▲25,788
- 2024/25: ▲28,052
- 2025/26: ▲33,226
Location
Notes
- Passenger statistics from the Office of Rail and Road

Ryder Brow railway station serves the Gorton and Ryder Brow areas of Manchester, England. It was opened in 1985 by British Rail as a stop on the Hope Valley Line; the station is located 2 3/4 miles (4.4 km) south-east of Manchester Piccadilly.

== Facilities ==
The station is unstaffed and has basic amenities only; there are waiting shelters and timetable posters on both platforms, with a payphone on platform 2. No ticket provision is offered, so these must be bought prior to travel or on the train.

Access to the platforms is via stepped ramps from the nearby road, so the station is not suitable for wheelchair users.

== Service ==
On Mondays to Saturdays, Northern Trains operates an hourly service in each direction between Manchester Piccadilly and New Mills Central.

There is no Sunday service.

Preceding station	National Rail	Following station
Belle Vue	Northern Trains Hope Valley Line	Reddish North
