= Totley Tunnel =

Railway tunnel on the Hope Valley Line in England

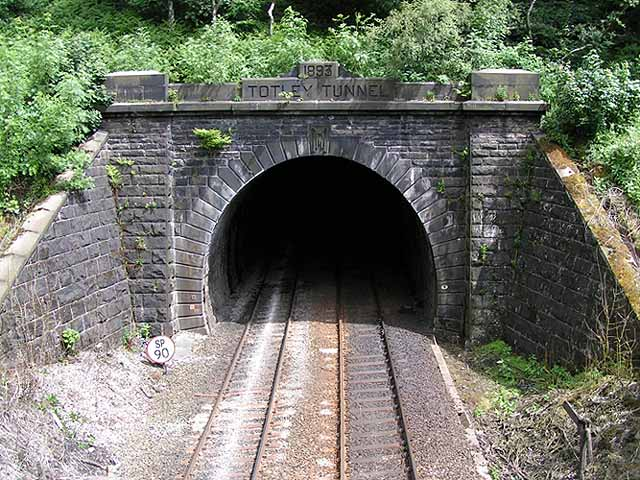
- Western portal
- Interactive map of Totley Tunnel

Overview
- Line: Hope Valley Line
- Location: Grindleford, Derbyshire
- Coordinates: 53.311°N 1.585°W

Operation
- Work began: 1888
- Constructed: Thomas Oliver of Horsham
- Opened: 1893
- Owner: Network Rail

Technical
- Design engineer: Parry and Storey of Nottingham
- Length: 6,230 yards (5.70 km; 3.54 mi)
- Track gauge: 4 ft 8 1/2 in (1,435 mm) standard gauge

Location of the tunnel within the Peak District

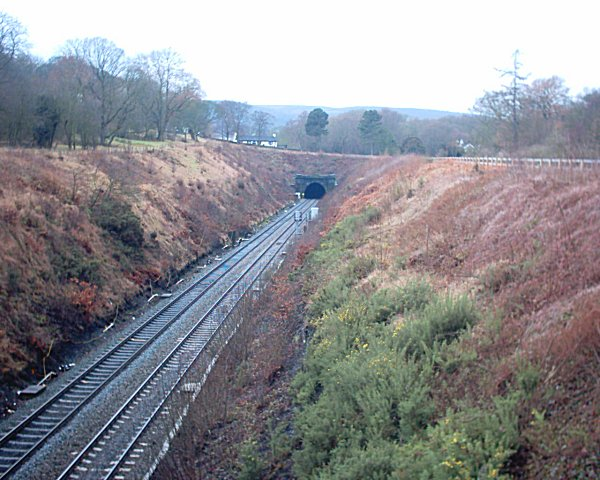
Eastern portal SK306801

Totley Tunnel is a 6,230-yard (3.5 mi; 5.7 km) tunnel under Totley Moor, on the Hope Valley Line between Totley on the outskirts of Sheffield and Grindleford in Derbyshire, England.

== Construction ==
Totley Tunnel was constructed by the Midland Railway on its line between Sheffield and Manchester via the Hope Valley. The engineers were Parry and Storey of Nottingham and the contractor for 10.5 miles (16.9 km) of the railway, including the tunnel, was Thomas Oliver of Horsham, West Sussex. Work began in 1888 with the construction of three brick surveying towers along the tunnel's proposed line, followed by vertical shafts to the level of the rails. The Duke of Rutland had decreed that no more than one ventilation shaft should be sunk through his land and that work should cease from August to October, during the grouse shooting season. Four permanent and three temporary shafts were sunk near to the Totley end. The latter were cut through shale, and water was encountered in the first eight feet. The permanent shafts took longer, encountering beds of ganister, coal and rock.

As the 10-by-9-foot (3.0 m × 2.7 m) headings were driven from the base of each shaft, water flow increased to 2.25 million imperial gallons (10,200,000 L) per day – equivalent to 26 imperial gallons (118 L) per second. At the Padley (Grindleford) end, the situation was little better and work stopped for several weeks until a drain was laid. Then, at about 2,000 yards (1,800 m), a spring was encountered which flooded the workings at 5,000 imperial gallons (23,000 L) per hour or 1.4 imperial gallons (6.3 L) per second. A raft was used to inspect the workings. Shortly after that, the shale became drier and work proceeded toward Totley, the headings finally meeting in 1892.

The tunnel was the proving ground of a number of boring machines for the shot holes, using gelignite to blast the rock. No limit was set on the amount and, in all, roughly 163 long tons (166 t; 183 short tons) were used. The atmosphere in the workings was hot and humid, and compressed air was used for ventilation. For a time at the Padley end, a turbine was installed in the Burbage Brook to drive a fan. During construction a natural cavern, several hundred square feet in area, was discovered, which was incorporated into the tunnel and a large air shaft was installed to the surface. The entrance to the cavern can be seen on the up side (towards Sheffield) of the tunnel halfway through.

Because of the damp conditions, the workforce suffered outbreaks of typhoid, diphtheria, smallpox and scarlet fever. Accommodation was scarce, and the workers lived often twenty to thirty in a house. Working 24-hour shifts, as soon as one man got out of his bed, another would take his place, with little in the way of washing or sanitary facilities.

At the time the tunnel was completed in 1893, it was the second-longest railway tunnel in the UK, the older Severn Tunnel being 0.8 miles (1.3 km) longer. Passenger services commenced in 1894. After the two High Speed 1 tunnels opened in 2007, it became the fourth longest mainline railway tunnel in the UK.

Because of its length, in addition to the Midland's normal block system, signal wires were installed which, when cut, caused alarms to ring in the signal boxes at each end. The same system was used in the shorter Cowburn and Clay Cross Tunnels.

From the Hope Valley towards Totley the tunnel starts level, then falls on gradients of 1 in 150, 1 in 176, and 1 in 100.

The Totley History Group examined the life history of Joseph Hibberd, a labourer who was injured whilst building the tunnel, and lingered, "crippled", for "five years".

== Services ==
Totley Tunnel is frequently used by both passenger trains between Sheffield and Manchester and freight lines operating from Hope. The passenger services are operated by Northern Trains, which operates a regular stopping service at the Hope Valley stations, TransPennine Express and East Midlands Railway. Above ground, there are a number of ventilation shafts still visible along the Dore and Totley Moss moorland. Several shafts are visible in Dore from Strawberry Lee Road, but safety railings have now been added across the top of the shafts. Additionally, the Western portal is easily observed by hikers at its location in Grindleford.

== See also ==
- West portal: SK250787
- East portal: SK306801
