= Reddish North railway station =

Railway station in Greater Manchester, England

Coordinates: 53.449°N 2.156°W

Reddish North
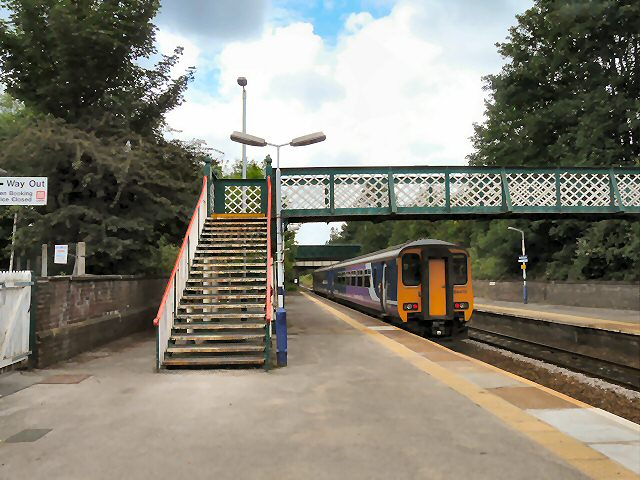
- Reddish North station in 2009

General information
- Location: Reddish, Stockport; England
- Grid reference: SJ897947
- Managed by: Northern Trains
- Transit authority: Transport for Greater Manchester
- Platforms: 2

Other information
- Station code: RDN
- Classification: DfT category E

History
- Opened: 1875

Passengers
- 2020/21: ▼55,858
- 2021/22: ▲0.145 million
- 2022/23: ▲0.146 million
- 2023/24: ▲0.184 million
- 2024/25: ▼0.163 million
Location
Notes
- Passenger statistics from the Office of Rail and Road

Reddish North is one of two railway stations serving the suburb of Reddish in Stockport, England; the other is Reddish South. It is on the Hope Valley Line between Manchester Piccadilly and Sheffield.

== History ==
It was built by the Sheffield and Midland Railway Companies' Committee in 1875, on the line between New Mills Central and Manchester London Road (now Piccadilly station).

As a joint venture of the Manchester, Sheffield and Lincolnshire Railway and the Midland Railway, it was a shorter route than the earlier-built line through Hyde Junction. It was used by the Midland railway's main line expresses from London St Pancras until 1880, when they began running via Stockport Tiviot Dale into Manchester Central.

Originally named simply Reddish, it became Reddish North in 1951. Some of the original buildings have disappeared over time. The original station yard, with goods shed, is intact (though without rails) and is currently used by a timber merchant. Although the original mileposts along this section were maintained by the Great Central Railway, the mileages are measured from Rowsley on the Midland Railway line, contrary to the latter's normal practice of measuring from St Pancras.

== Facilities ==
The station retains its ticket office, which is staffed on weekdays all day (06:30-21:00) and on Saturday until early afternoon (07:20-14:30). Outside of these times, tickets must be bought in advance or on the train. There is a waiting shelter on platform 2, along with bench seating. Train running information is supplied via CIS screens, timetable posters and automated announcements. Step-free access is only available on the Manchester-bound platform (1), as the only access to platform 2 is via a stepped footbridge.

== Service ==
The current off-peak service in trains per hour is:

- 2 tph to Manchester Piccadilly (1 non-stop, 1 stopping)
- 2 tph to New Mills Central, of which 1 continues to Sheffield

On Sundays, there is an hourly service between Manchester Piccadilly and Sheffield.

All services that stop at Reddish North are operated by Northern Trains, using Class 150, 156 and 195 diesel multiple units.

Preceding station	National Rail	Following station
Brinnington	Northern Trains Hope Valley Line	Ryder Brow
Brinnington	Northern Trains Hope Valley Line	Manchester Piccadilly
