= Edale railway station =

Railway station in Derbyshire, England

Edale
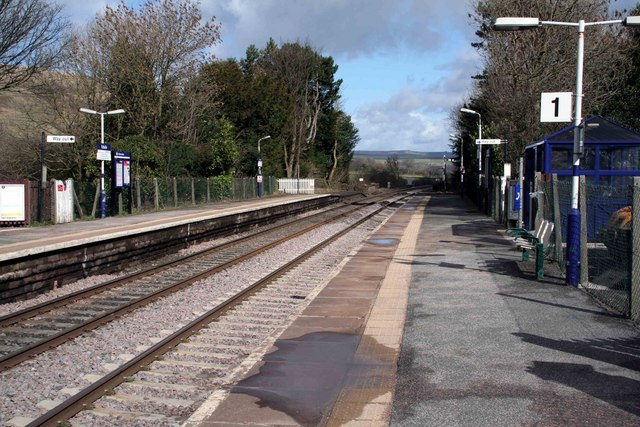

General information
- Location: Edale, High Peak; England
- Coordinates: 53.36443°N 1.81663°W
- Grid reference: SK123853
- Manager: Northern Trains
- Platforms: 2

Other information
- Station code: EDL
- Classification: DfT category F2

History
- Opened: 25 June 1894
- Original company: Midland Railway
- Pre-grouping: Midland Railway
- Post-grouping: London Midland and Scottish Railway

Passengers
- 2020/21: ▼45,800
- 2021/22: ▲109,250
- 2022/23: ▲116,982
- 2023/24: ▲145,830
- 2024/25: ▲171,814
Location
Notes
- Passenger statistics from the Office of Rail and Road

Edale railway station serves the rural village of Edale in the Derbyshire Peak District, in England. It is located 20 miles (32 km) west of Sheffield and 22 miles (35 km) east of Manchester Piccadilly. The station was opened in 1894 on the Midland Railway's Dore and Chinley line, now known as the Hope Valley Line.

Lying below Kinder Scout, the station is about 5 minutes' walk from the centre of the village, where the Pennine Way begins; the Nags Head public house is known as the official starting point.

== History ==
The station was opened on 25 June 1894 when the Midland Railway opened the line between Dore and Chinley for passengers, the line had opened for freight on 6 November 1893.

The station had two platforms either side of a double track connected by an underpass, there was a signal box and sidings to both sides of the running lines to the west of the station.

The station was host to two LMS caravans from 1935 to 1939. A camping coach was positioned here by the London Midland Region from 1954 to 1956.

It became an unstaffed halt in 1969. It formerly had wooden buildings and canopies on each side, but these have been demolished and replaced by basic shelters.

== Facilities ==
The station is managed and served primarily by Northern Trains using rolling stock such as the Class 150 Sprinter and Class 195 Civity, with the occasional Class 156 Super Sprinter. East Midlands Railway services are usually run with Class 158 Express Sprinter units. The station has two platforms with no level crossing or footbridge. To change platforms, there is an underpass located next to the road in the village.

The station has now received ticketing provision in the form of automatic ticket vending machines (like all the other stations on the route between New Mills Central and Dore and Totley), so passengers can buy their tickets prior to travel. Leading on from this, a penalty fare scheme is in operation here and at other Hope Valley stations. Train running information is offered via CIS displays, automated announcements, timetable posters and a customer help point on each platform. Step-free access is available to both platforms via ramps to/from the subway.

== Service ==
The typical off-peak is one train an hour, with some gaps at certain times of the day, to Sheffield and to Manchester Piccadilly via Marple, provided solely by Northern. This also applies on Saturdays and Sundays. Until 2018, weekday trains only called every second hour for much of the day.

East Midlands Railway provide the first service of the day to Liverpool Lime Street via Warrington Central. The final return working of the day starts from Liverpool Lime Street and continues on to Nottingham via Sheffield. All other services are provided by Northern Trains. A normal weekday service operates on most bank holidays. As of the May 2026 timetable change East Midlands Railway also provide an additional call at Edale at 11:03 on a Sunday. With the 09:42 Nottingham to Liverpool Lime Street service calling..

Preceding station	National Rail	Following station
Hope	Northern Trains Hope Valley Line	Chinley
Hope	East Midlands Railway Liverpool-Norwich Limited service	Chinley
	Disused railways	
Hope; Line and station open	Midland Railway	Chapel-en-le-Frith Central; Line and station closed
Terminus	British Rail	Chee Dale Halt; Line and station closed
