= Hyde North railway station =

Railway station in Greater Manchester, England

Hyde North
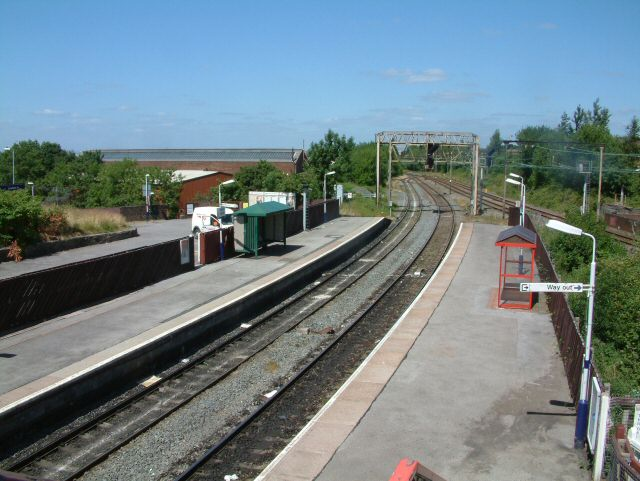
- Hyde North railway station in 2006

General information
- Location: Hyde, Tameside; England
- Coordinates: 53.464°N 2.086°W
- Grid reference: SJ944964
- Manager: Northern Trains
- Transit authority: Greater Manchester
- Platforms: 2

Other information
- Station code: HYT
- Classification: DfT category F2

History
- Original company: Manchester, Sheffield and Lincolnshire Railway
- Pre-grouping: Sheffield and Midland Railway Companies' Committee
- Post-grouping: Sheffield and Midland Railway Companies' Committee

Key dates
- February 1863: Opened as Hyde Junction
- 17 September 1951: Renamed Hyde North

Passengers
- 2021/22: ▲20,220
- 2022/23: ▲27,944
- 2023/24: ▲35,340
- 2024/25: ▲43,946
- 2025/26: ▲47,384
Location
Notes
- Passenger statistics from the Office of Rail and Road

Hyde North is a railway station serving the north of Hyde, Greater Manchester, England. It is managed by Northern Trains, who also operate all services that stop here.

== History ==
It was opened originally as Hyde Junction in February 1863. The station was sited at the junction between the Manchester, Sheffield and Lincolnshire Railway's extension to New Mills, operated jointly with the Midland Railway as the Sheffield and Midland Railway Companies' Committee, and the MS&L main line through Penistone to Sheffield. For a while, it saw the Midland's expresses from London; however, in 1875, a new and more direct route was built through Bredbury. On 17 September 1951, the station was renamed Hyde North.

== Hyde North Junction accident ==
The junction just outside the station was the scene of a crash on 22 August 1990. At around 09:50, two trains collided across the single lead junction where the two routes diverged; these were the 09:33 from Rose Hill Marple to Manchester Piccadilly and the 09:36 from Manchester Piccadilly to Sheffield. There were 28 minor injuries amongst the 42 passengers.

The official report found that the driver of the Rose Hill train had inadvertently passed a signal set at danger and passed onto the short section of single track between the platform end and the junction points where the collision took place. It also concluded that the driver had not received adequate training.

== Services ==
Hyde North is served by half-hourly trains in each direction on Mondays to Saturdays, between Manchester Piccadilly and Rose Hill Marple, via Guide Bridge. There is no service on Sundays.

The tracks behind the station carry electric multiple units on the Glossop line between Manchester Piccadilly, Glossop and Hadfield. Despite the station's former name, Hyde Junction, which suggested that passengers had a choice of routes, there never were platforms on the Glossop line here; trains call at nearby Flowery Field instead.

Preceding station	National Rail	Following station
Hyde Central	Northern Trains Hope Valley Line; Hyde Loop Mondays-Saturdays only	Guide Bridge
