= Cowburn Tunnel =

Railway tunnel on the Hope Valley Line in England

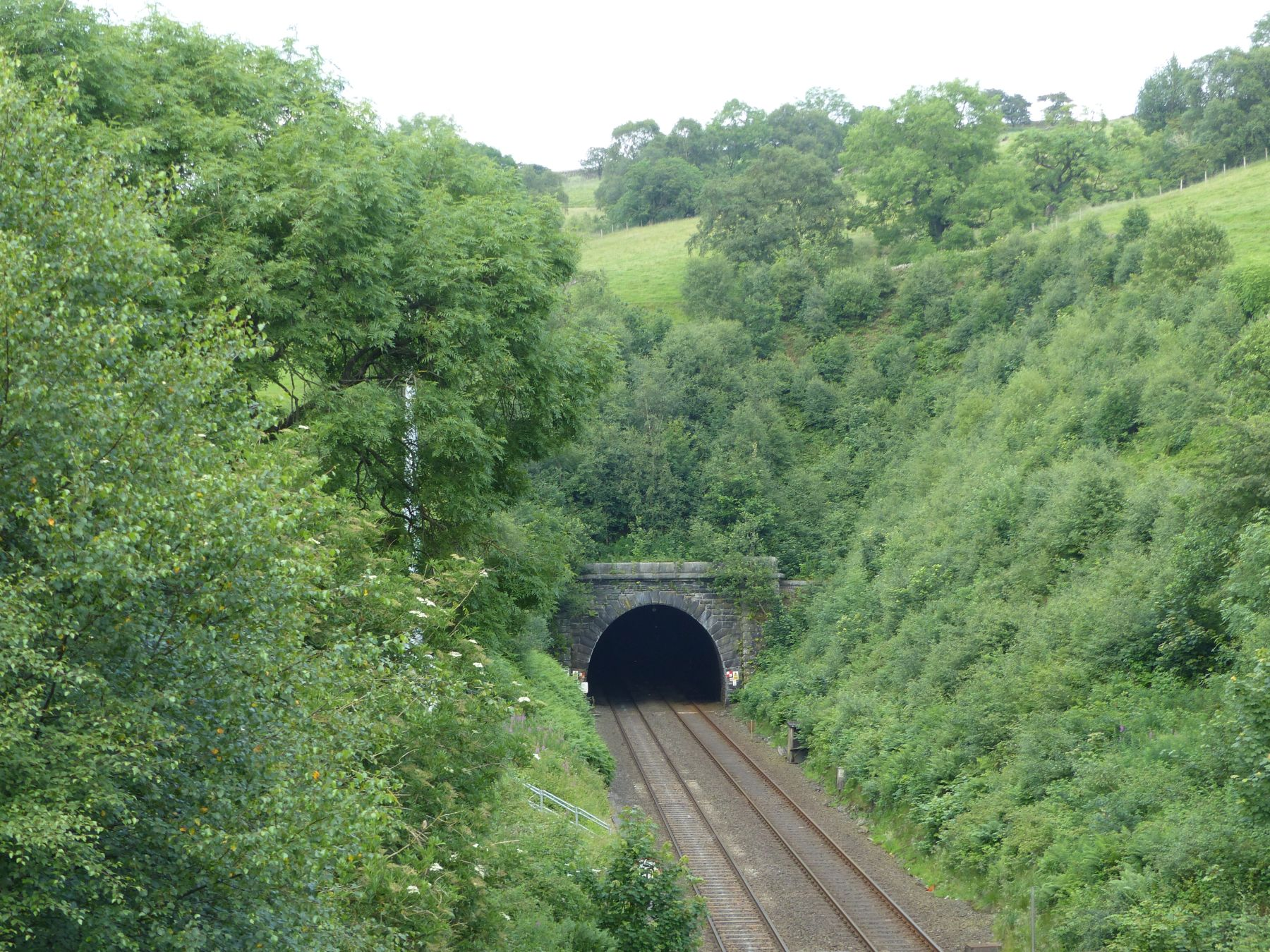
- Western portal

Overview
- Line: Hope Valley Line
- Location: Edale, Derbyshire
- Coordinates: 53°21′07″N 1°52′00″W

Operation
- Work began: October 1888
- Opened: March 1893
- Owner: Network Rail

Technical
- Length: 3,702 yards (3.385 km; 2.103 mi)

Route map
- Location of the tunnel within the Peak District

The Cowburn Tunnel is a railway tunnel at the western end of the Vale of Edale in the Derbyshire Peak District of England. The tunnel is 3,702 yards (3,385 m) long. It is the deepest railway tunnel in England, at 875 feet (267 m).

== History ==
=== Construction ===
The Midland Railway began work on the Hope Valley Line between Sheffield and Manchester in 1888. The tunnel was engineered underneath Colborne, part of a 1,700-foot (518 m) moorland between Kinder Scout and Rushup Edge. The Midland awarded the tunnel contract to J.P. Edwards of Nottingham. Construction work started in October 1888 when a ventilation shaft was sunk in Cartledge Meadow near Edale. Tunnelling also started at the other end near Chapel-en-le-Frith and the breakthrough between the two sections was made on 18 July 1891. The lining out of the tunnel and laying of the rails was completed by March 1893, when the workmen were dispersed.

A single ventilation shaft, accessible via the moorland north-west of Mam Tor, is 791 feet (241 m) deep, making it one of the deepest railway ventilation shafts in the country. The shaft was constructed in 1894 over the course of two years. Men lived on the rough exposed moorlands to dig the shafts without any modern machinery and were lowered into the shaft using a winch mechanism. 102 men worked eight-hour shifts day and night to excavate, mason and brick the shaft. It was eventually completed on 16 March 1896. Currently the shaft remains open, but protected by a large brick enclosure (pictured).

Although the workings were relatively dry for tunnel builders at the time, on one occasion the headings filled with water to a depth of 90 ft (27.4 m).

=== Maintenance ===
Repairs to the ventilation shaft were carried out in August to September 2021 by Network Rail, with an investment of around £800,000. The work involved installation of a system of drainage pipes inside the shaft to collect rainwater which seeps through its brickwork from the soil, which had been cascading onto the railway below. The new system diverts water to drains inside the tunnel itself. To avoid disrupting rail traffic, helicopters were used to airlift equipment to build a temporary platform to lower engineers inside the shaft similarly to the original constructors.

== Description ==
Cowburn Tunnel takes the Hope Valley Line west out of Edale valley, to emerge near Chapel Milton, 2.5 miles (4 km) east of Chinley railway station.

Unusually, the tunnel is not built at a constant gradient: in fact, the summit of the line between Dore and Chinley lies within the tunnel, about a quarter of the way from the eastern end. From the summit, the tunnel falls at 1 in 100 (1%) eastwards and 1 in 150 (0.67%) westwards. Nevertheless, when the headings met, they were no more than 1 inch (25.4 mm) out of line in the vertical direction, and met exactly in the horizontal direction. Only one vertical shaft was used.

== Gallery ==
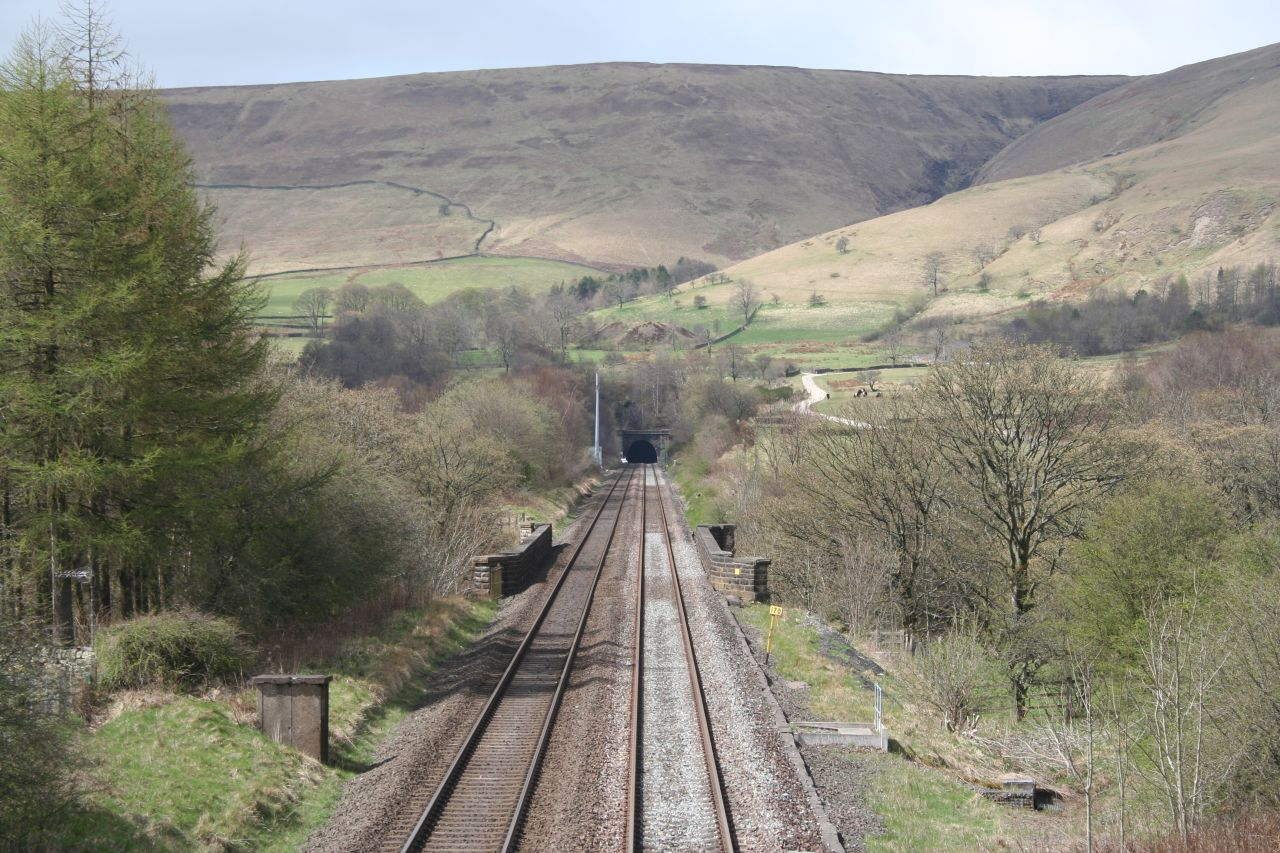
The eastern portal, from Barber Booth

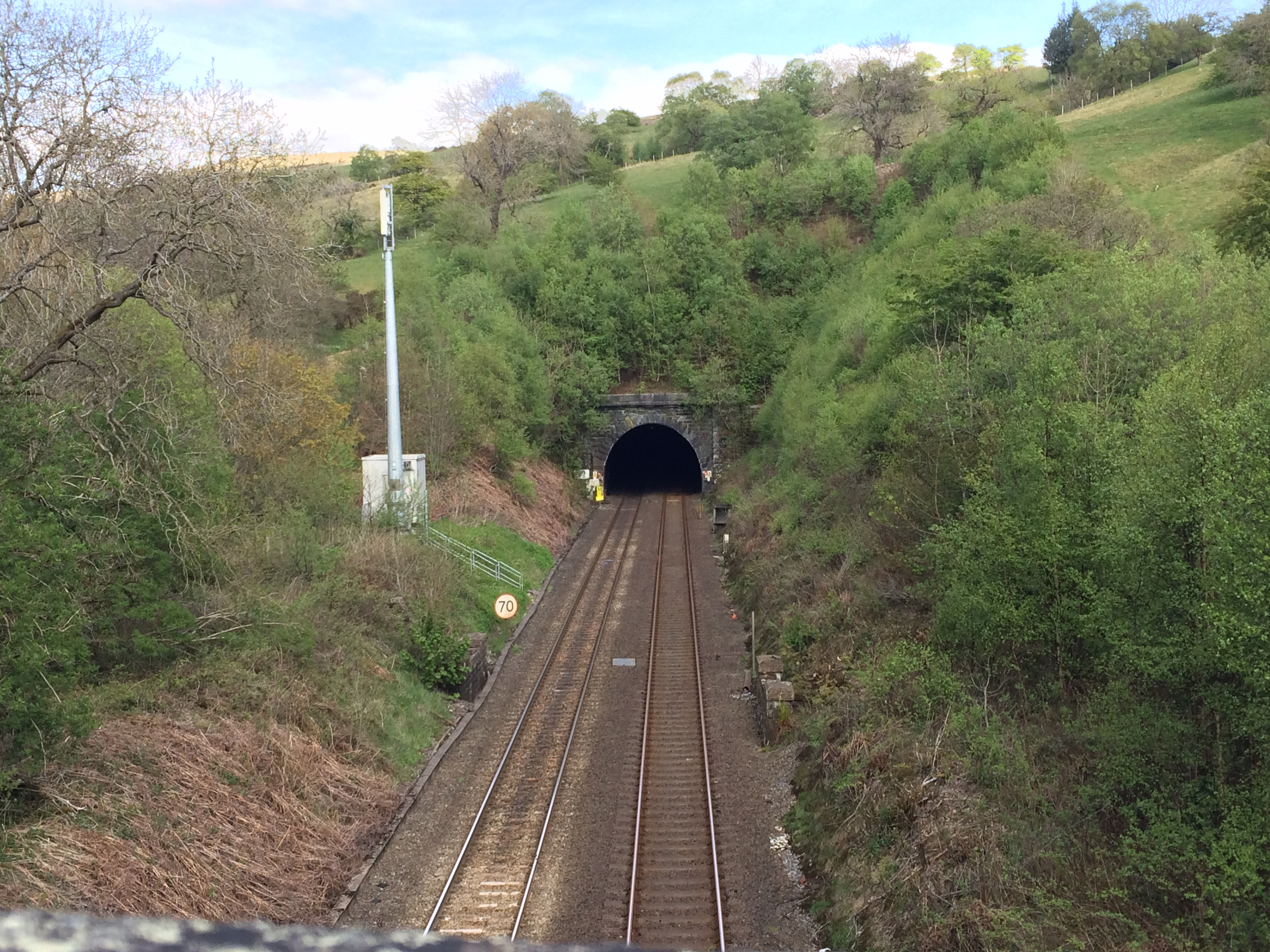
The western portal, near Malcoff

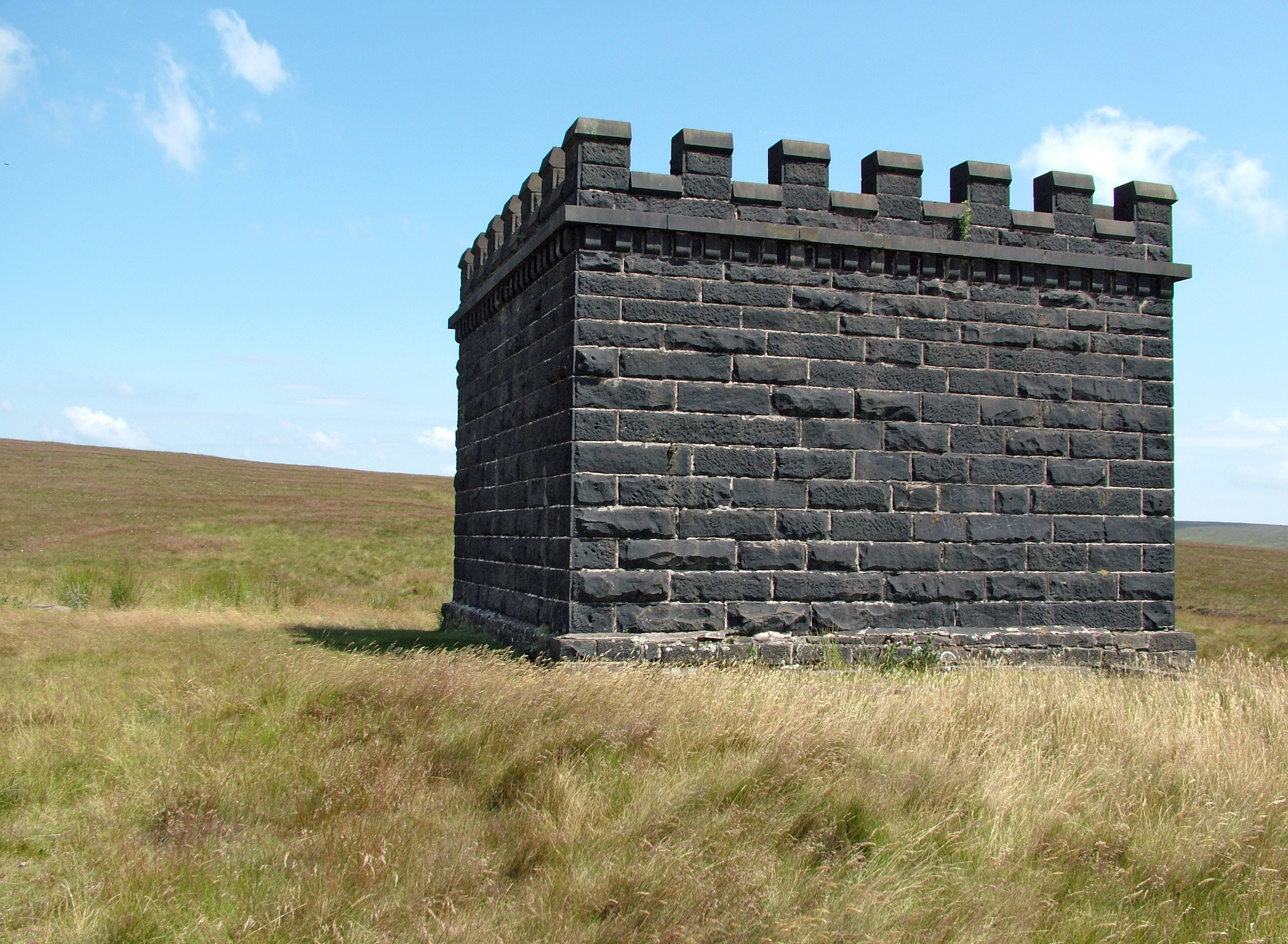
Airshaft, Colborne

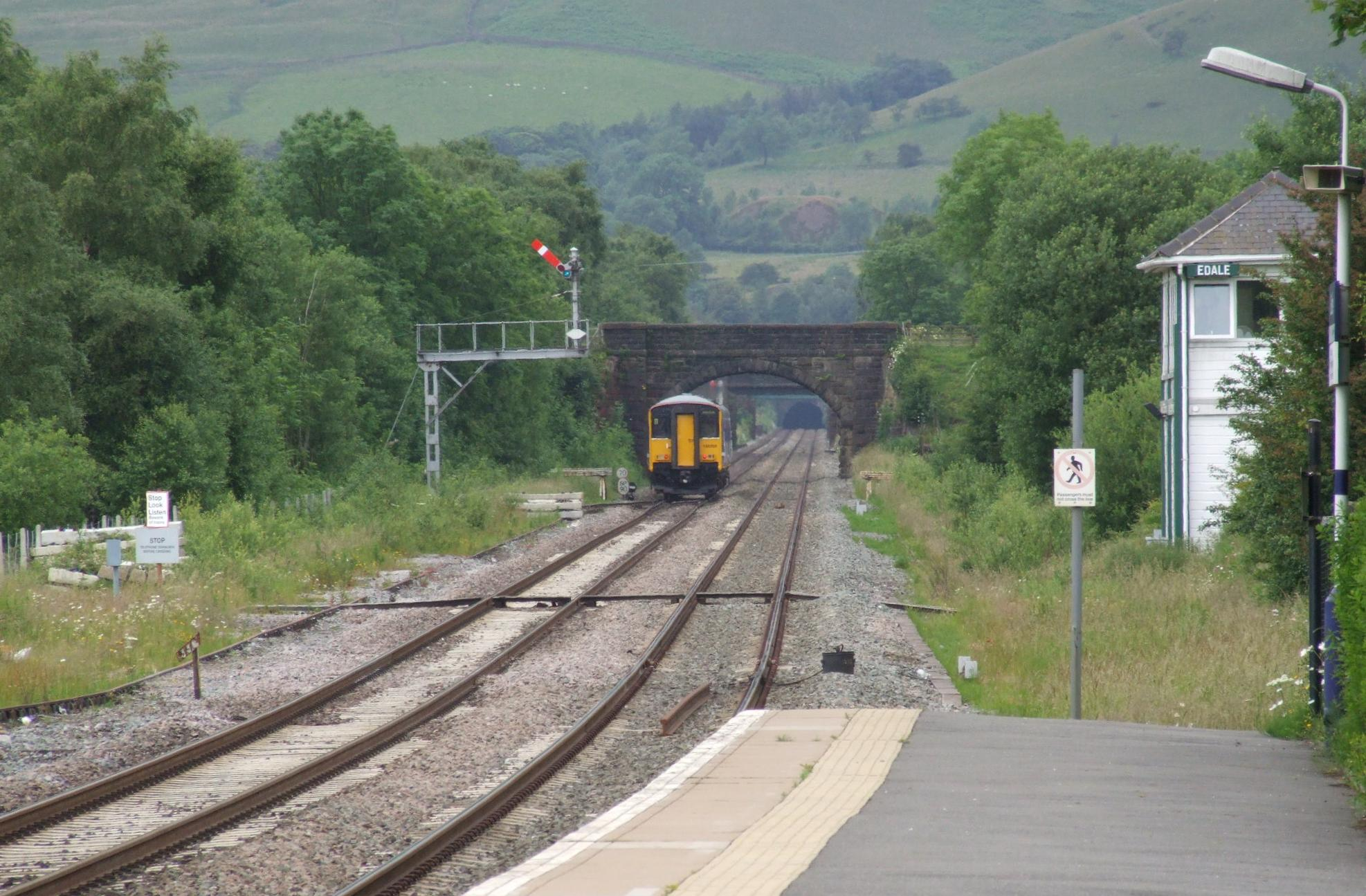
In this picture, taken from Edale station, the eastern portal is seen beyond the departing Manchester-bound train. The route is still semaphore-signalled between Totley Tunnel East and Chinley signal boxes.
