= Hyde Central railway station =

Railway station in Greater Manchester, England

Coordinates: 53.452°N 2.086°W

Hyde Central
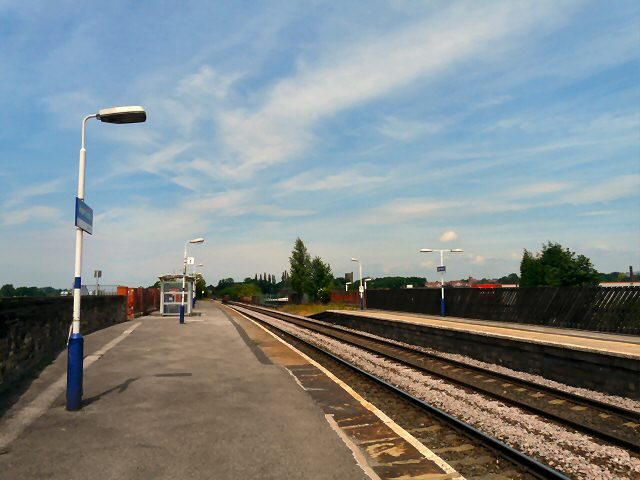
- Hyde Central railway station in 2009

General information
- Location: Hyde, Tameside, Greater Manchester; England
- Grid reference: SJ944949
- Managed by: Northern Trains
- Transit authority: Greater Manchester
- Platforms: 2

Other information
- Station code: HYC
- Classification: DfT category F1

Key dates
- 1858: Opened as Hyde
- 1951: Renamed Hyde Central

Passengers
- 2020/21: ▼12,552
- 2021/22: ▲51,082
- 2022/23: ▲60,534
- 2023/24: ▲63,796
- 2024/25: ▲68,992
Location
Notes
- Passenger statistics from the Office of Rail and Road

Hyde Central is the main railway station serving Hyde, in Greater Manchester, England; other stations in the town include Hyde North, Flowery Field and Newton for Hyde. It is a stop on the Hope Valley Line, hosting services between Manchester Piccadilly and Rose Hill Marple.

== History ==
Originally simply named Hyde, it was built by the Manchester, Sheffield and Lincolnshire Railway, opening in 1858 as a branch from its main line through Penistone to Sheffield. From 1862, the branch was extended to New Mills to meet the Midland Railway's extension of its line from Millers Dale. For a while, it saw Midlands expresses from London. In 1875, however, a new more direct route was built through Bredbury.

The substantial station buildings were demolished in 1980, with a new booking office at street level commissioned in their place.

In July 2020, Northern informed local residents that services between Manchester and Rose Hill Marple would not operate between early September and mid-December 2020; this was due to the effects of the COVID-19 pandemic on their workforce. Although disruption occurred, the service was restored soon afterwards.

== Service ==
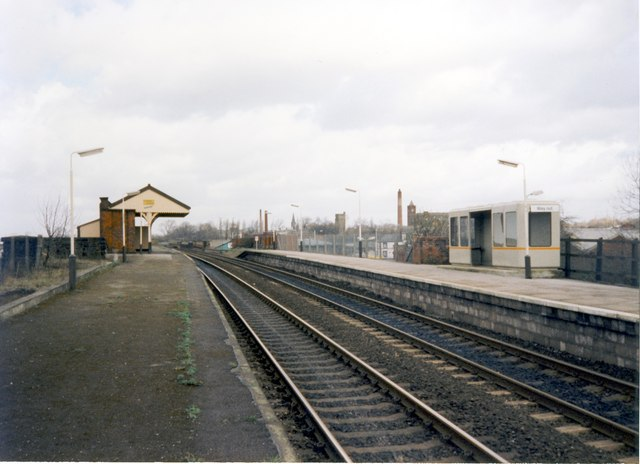
Hyde Central railway station in 1989

Hyde Central is served by half-hourly trains in each direction on Mondays to Saturdays, between Manchester Piccadilly and Rose Hill Marple, via Guide Bridge. The services are less frequent in the evening, and there is no Sunday service.

All trains are diesel multiple units, normally Class 150s or Class 195s, operated by Northern Trains.

Preceding station	National Rail	Following station
Woodley	Northern Trains Hope Valley Line; Hyde Loop Mondays-Saturdays only	Hyde North
