= Romiley railway station =

Railway station in Greater Manchester, England

Coordinates: 53.414°N 2.089°W

Romiley
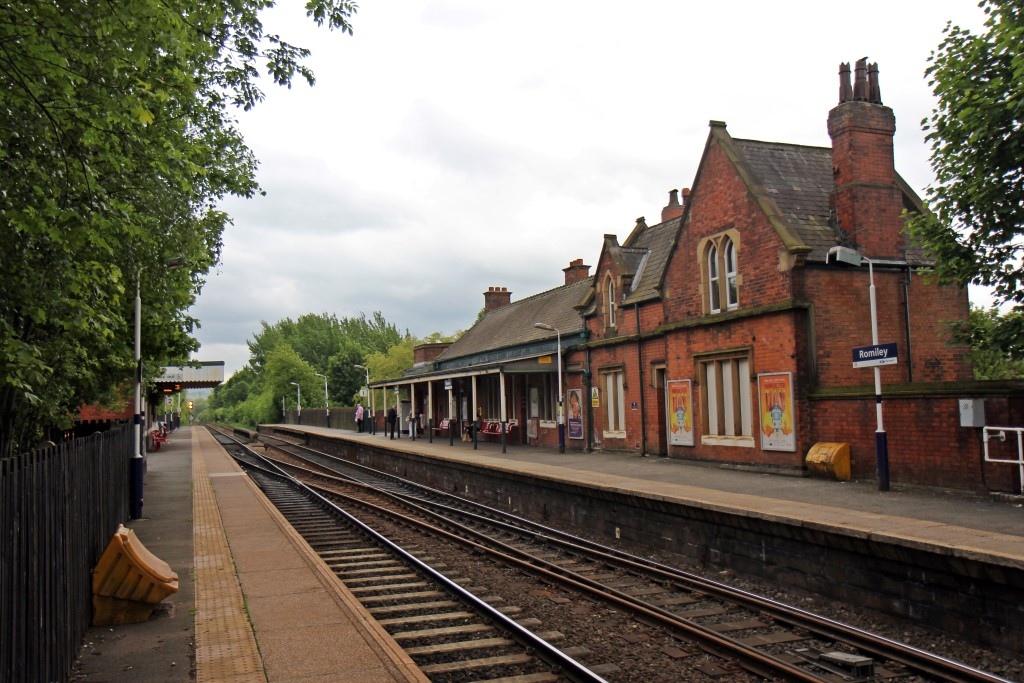

General information
- Location: Romiley, Stockport, England
- Grid reference: SJ941908
- Managed by: Northern Trains
- Transit authority: Transport for Greater Manchester
- Platforms: 2

Other information
- Station code: RML
- Classification: DfT category E

History
- Opened: 1862

Key dates
- 2022: Platforms extended

Passengers
- 2020/21: ▼70,920
- Interchange: ▼1,761
- 2021/22: ▲0.207 million
- Interchange: ▲5,878
- 2022/23: ▲0.245 million
- Interchange: ▲7,391
- 2023/24: ▲0.277 million
- Interchange: ▲9,363
- 2024/25: ▲0.287 million
- Interchange: ▲9,807
Location
Notes
- Passenger statistics from the Office of Rail and Road

Romiley railway station serves Romiley, in the Metropolitan Borough of Stockport, Greater Manchester, England. It is sited at a junction of two parts of the Hope Valley Line, providing services between Manchester Piccadilly, New Mills Central and Sheffield, and also between Piccadilly and Rose Hill Marple.

== History ==
Stockport's historical rail network

The station was built by the Manchester, Sheffield and Lincolnshire Railway on its extension to New Mills, opening in 1862 from Manchester London Road. A second route, the Macclesfield, Bollington and Marple Railway to Macclesfield which joined the older line at Marple Wharf Junction, was opened in 1869; this provided an onward link to Stoke-on-Trent.

From the south, trains would arrive both from Marple, on the Hope Valley Line from Sheffield, and Rose Hill Marple from Macclesfield. The MB&MR line was closed south of Rose Hill to Macclesfield in January 1970; this line had been recommended for closure in the 1963 Beeching Report. The short branch to Rose Hill itself was reprieved by the then Minister of Transport Richard Marsh in 1969, when granting permission to close the rest of the route.

To the north, the line split in three ways. Initially, it just ran through to Woodley to join the original MS&L line at Hyde Junction, leading on to Manchester London Road. In 1875, a more direct route to Manchester was opened through Reddish. A further branch, opened in 1869, led to Stockport Tiviot Dale; at one time, this route carried through trains between Derby and Manchester Central but it was closed to passenger services in January 1967 and much of the line was lifted in 1983.

== Facilities ==
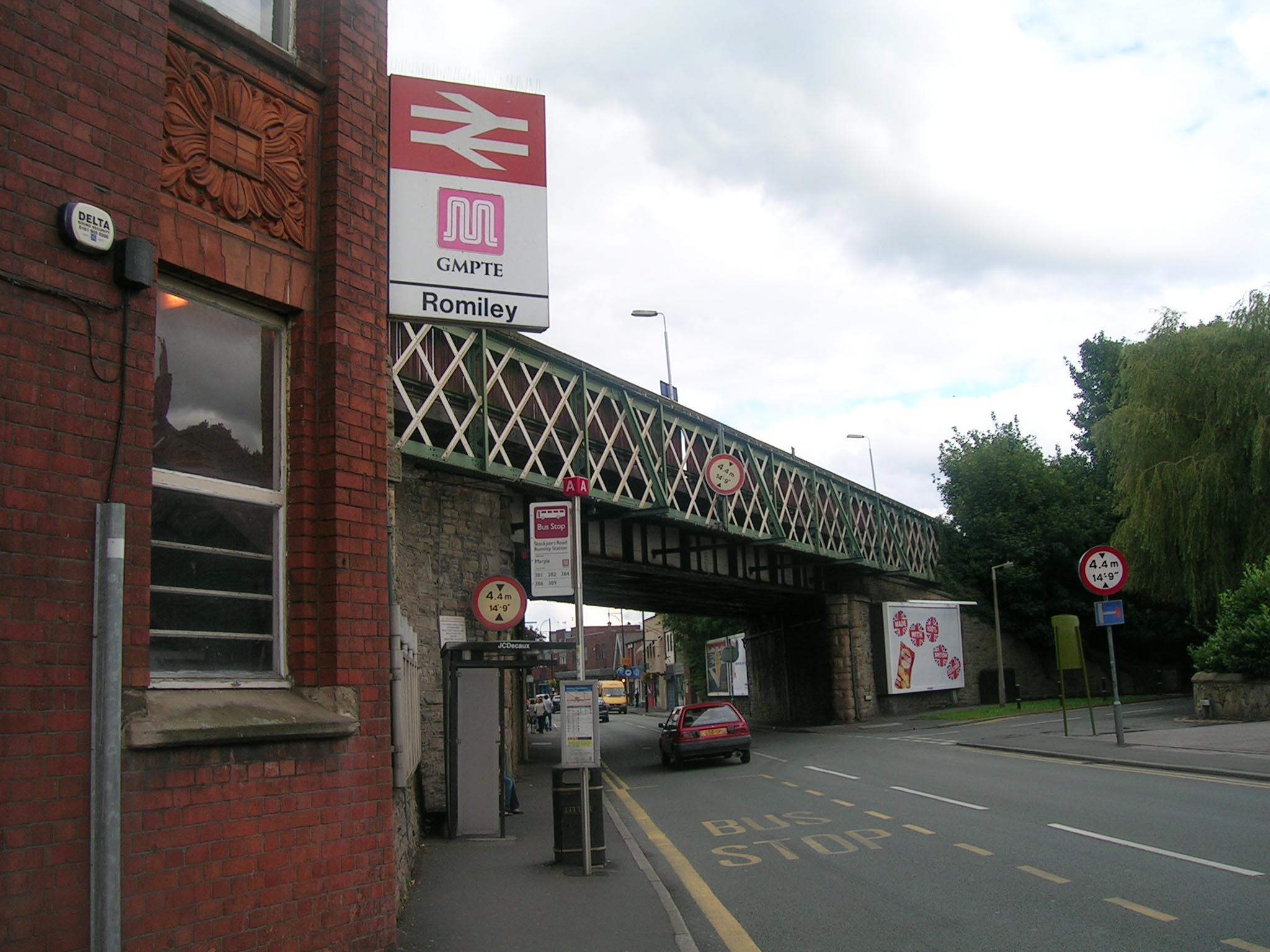
Romiley station entrance and the bridge over the B6104 (Stockport Road)

The station was built above street level; its platforms extend over the B6104 road. It has a spiral staircase, which once had a glass-roofed dome. The booking hall (staffed 06:20-20:45 weekdays and 07:10-21:35 Saturdays) and offices are on the first floor, with a subway and stairs to the platforms. Ramps are also available for wheelchair users. It has a long line public address system providing automated announcements and digital information displays to offer train running details.

== Service ==
Northern Trains provides the following general off-peak service, in trains per hour (tph):

- 2 tph to Manchester Piccadilly, via Bredbury
- 3 tp2h to Manchester Piccadilly, via Woodley
- 2 tph to Marple; of which:
  - 1 tph continues to New Mills Central
  - 1 tph continues to Sheffield
- 3 tp2h to Rose Hill Marple.

On Sundays, there is 1 tph in each direction between Manchester Piccadilly and Sheffield; there is no service to and from Rose Hill.

Preceding station	National Rail	Following station
Bredbury	Northern Hope Valley Line	Marple
Woodley	Northern Hope Valley Line	Rose Hill Marple
	Disused railways	
Stockport Tiviot Dale	Great Central and Midland Joint Railway	Marple

== Future ==
As part of Manchester's Transport Innovation Fund (TIF) bid, which would have seen a weekday peak time congestion charge introduced on roads into the city centre in order for a £3bn injection into the region's public transport, it had been announced that the route from Marple station would have seen an increase to four services per hour in both directions throughout the day to Manchester Piccadilly.

This would therefore have meant an increase to five services per hour at Romiley, with possibility for more, should services from Rose Hill Marple have been increased as discussed. The line would have effectively been run as a 'turn up and go' operation, offering users of stations along the route the ease of showing up without generally needing to know exact departure times.

Romiley railway station was also planned to become an official TIF Park & Ride interchange under the proposals, which faced a public referendum in December 2008. These were rejected by a substantial margin and the plans were eventually dropped in the spring of 2010.
