= Hathersage railway station =

Railway station in Derbyshire, England

Coordinates: 53.326°N 1.651°W

Hathersage
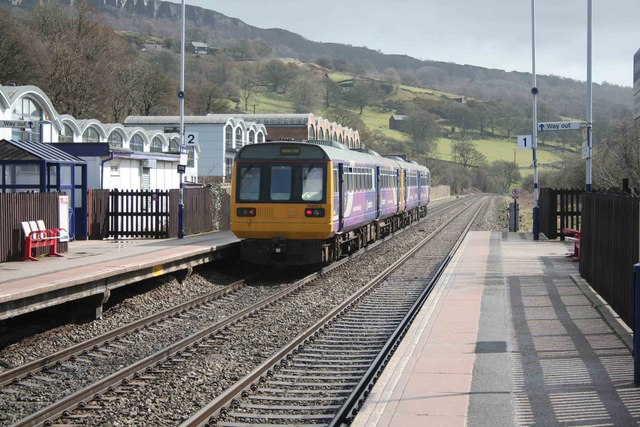

General information
- Location: Hathersage, Derbyshire Dales; England
- Grid reference: SK232810
- Managed by: Northern Trains
- Platforms: 2

Other information
- Station code: HSG
- Classification: DfT category F2

History
- Opened: 25 June 1894
- Original company: Midland Railway
- Pre-grouping: Midland Railway
- Post-grouping: London Midland and Scottish Railway

Passengers
- 2020/21: ▼22,144
- 2021/22: ▲67,774
- 2022/23: ▲72,670
- 2023/24: ▲95,246
- 2024/25: ▲0.112 million
Location
Notes
- Passenger statistics from the Office of Rail and Road

Hathersage railway station serves the village of Hathersage, in the Derbyshire Peak District, England. It is a stop on the Hope Valley Line between Sheffield and Manchester Piccadilly.

== History ==
The station was opened on 25 June 1894 when the Midland Railway opened the line between Dore and Chinley (now the Hope Valley Line) for passengers, the line had opened for freight on 6 November 1893. The original buildings were of timber and have disappeared, with the platforms being rebuilt in masonry. The villagers' initial reaction to proposals to build the railway may have been unenthusiastic. They had already had an unfavourable experience of the 'iron horse' in the form of a traction engine in 1882, which, drawing two heavy carts, had made the roads almost impassable, killing a boy and overturning a mail cart. In addition, a private carriage collided with it, killing one of the occupants.

The station had two platforms either side of a double track connected by an underpass, there was a signal box and sidings to both sides of the running lines to the east of the station. The goods yard was able to handle a full range of goods including live stock, it was equipped with a 10-ton crane.

The station was host to two LMS caravans from 1934 to 1935 and one from 1936 to 1939. A camping coach was positioned here by the London Midland Region from 1954 to 1955.

=== Stationmasters ===
- Mr. Sharon Morton 1896 - 1908
- Thomas Paley 1909 - 1925 (formerly station master at Brightside)
- John William Loomes 1925 - 1931 (formerly station master at Castle Bromwich)
- R.J. Dowthwaite from 1931 (also station master at Grindleford)

== Facilities ==
The station is unstaffed, but has been fitted with automatic ticket vending machines to allow passengers to purchase tickets before travelling. Standard waiting shelters are provided on both platforms and train running information is offered via CIS displays, automated announcements, a pay phone and timetable posters. Step-free access is available to both platforms, which are linked via a ramped subway.

== Service ==
The typical off-peak service from the station is one train every hour in each direction between Sheffield and Manchester Piccadilly; services are provided by Northern Trains.

East Midlands Railway call here with the first service of the day to Liverpool Lime Street and also on the final return working to Nottingham.

Preceding station	National Rail	Following station
Grindleford	Northern Trains Hope Valley Line	Bamford
Grindleford	East Midlands Railway Liverpool-Nottingham route (Limited service)	Bamford
