= Chinley railway station =

Railway station in Derbyshire, England

Coordinates: 53.340°N 1.944°W

Chinley
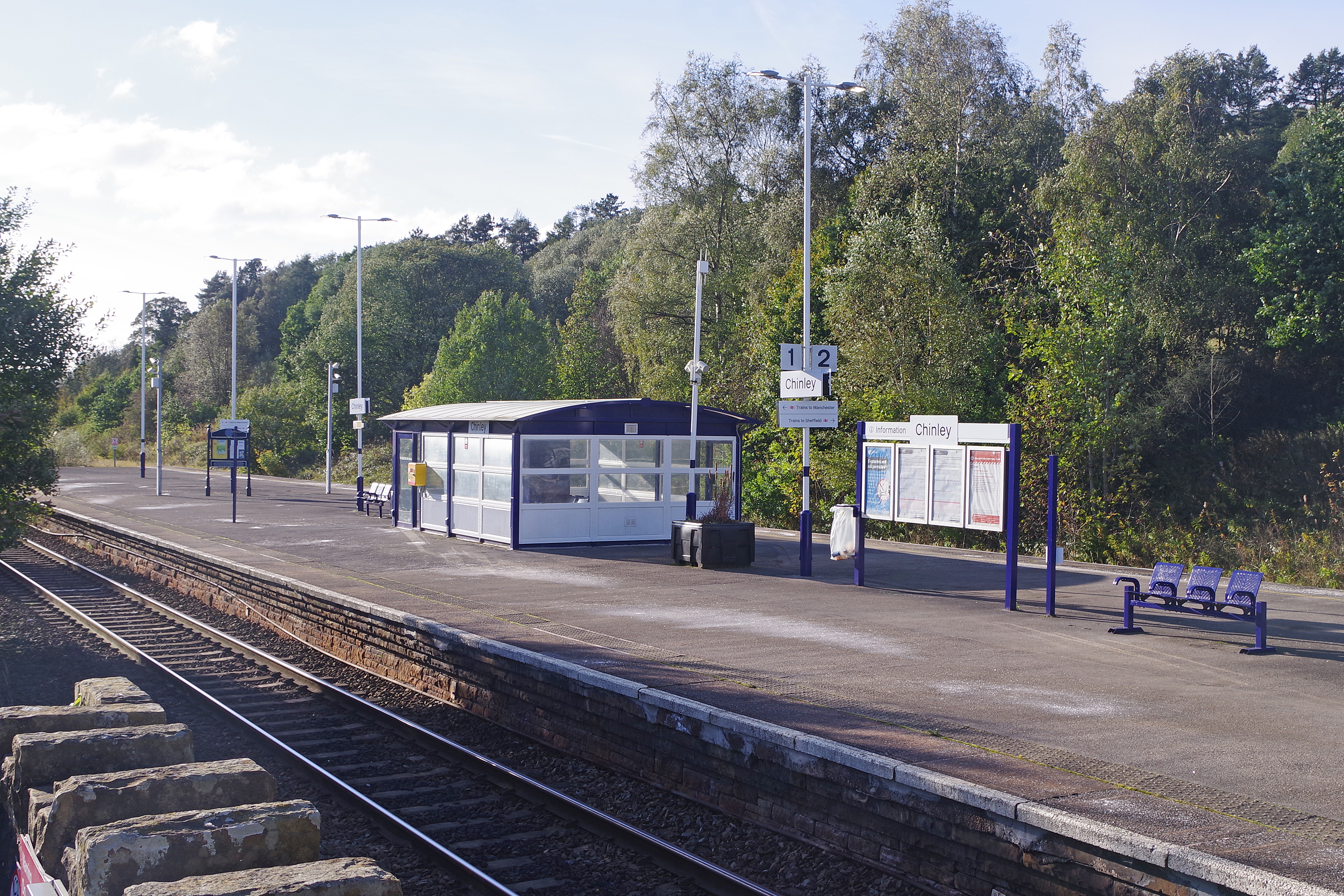
- Chinley Railway Station

General information
- Location: Chinley, High Peak; England
- Grid reference: SK038826
- Managed by: Northern Trains
- Platforms: 2

Other information
- Station code: CLY
- Classification: DfT category F2

Key dates
- 1867: Opened
- 1 June 1902: Moved to current location

Passengers
- 2020/21: ▼21,856
- Interchange: ▼557
- 2021/22: ▲80,106
- Interchange: ▲1,446
- 2022/23: ▲93,244
- Interchange: ▼1,356
- 2023/24: ▲0.102 million
- Interchange: ▲1,974
- 2024/25: ▲0.129 million
- Interchange: ▲6,524
Location
Notes
- Passenger statistics from the Office of Rail and Road

Chinley railway station serves the rural village of Chinley in Derbyshire, England. The station is 17 1/2 miles (28.2 km) south east of Manchester Piccadilly on the Hope Valley Line from Sheffield to Manchester. It is 169 miles 40 chains (272.8 km) from St Pancras via Toton. It is unstaffed and is managed by Northern Trains.

== History ==
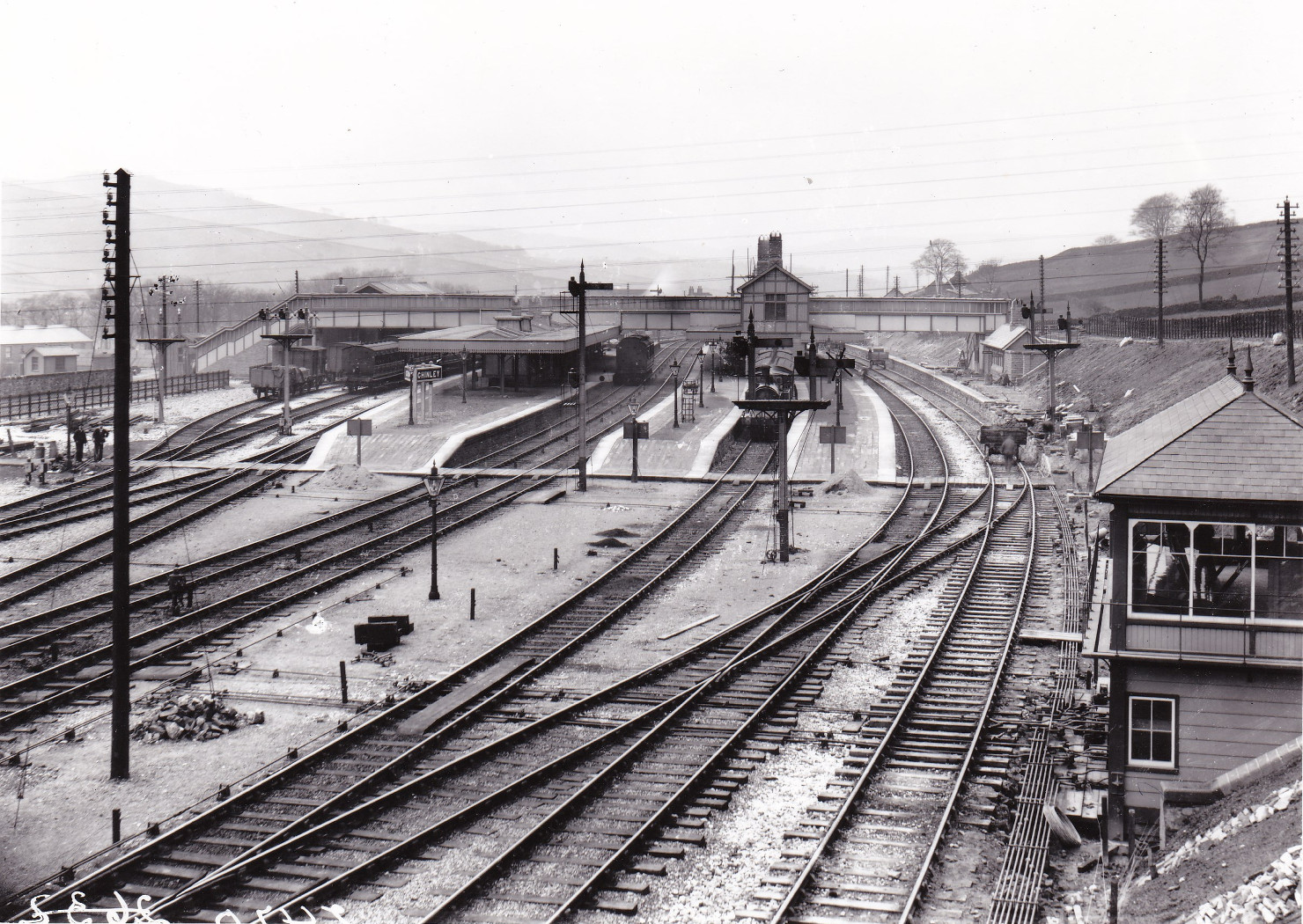
An image showing the full extent of Chinley railway station in 1910.

The original station was built in 1867 by the Midland Railway on the extension of its Manchester, Buxton, Matlock and Midlands Junction Railway, which became its main line to London from Manchester. Originally, the Midland had planned to extend through Buxton, but the LNWR already had a line there. So, the Midland built a line through Chinley and Buxworth to join the Manchester, Sheffield and Lincolnshire Railway at New Mills; this was an association which became known as the Sheffield and Midland Railway Companies' Committee.

In the early 1900s, the original Chinley station was deemed too small for purpose and was relocated to its present site. The new station opened on 1 June 1902, when the line through Disley Tunnel to Heaton Mersey (and thence on to Manchester Central) was opened and the extra tracks between Chinley North Junction & New Mills South Junction were commissioned. The old station buildings were dismantled and re-erected on Maynestone Road as a private house. It also became the terminus of the Dore and Chinley line, instead of Buxton. By 1904, Chinley had become an important junction between Manchester, London St Pancras and Sheffield, with five through platforms and one east-facing bay, with four main tracks passing through it. Many express trains from the Midlands and London would call there to attach or detach coaches for destinations in the North West (including Blackburn and Liverpool Central High Level), as well as the main Midland terminus at Manchester Central. This practice became somewhat less prevalent after the 1923 Grouping when the London, Midland and Scottish Railway took over but, in the 1930s, some 40 eastbound and 38 westbound trains either called or started/terminated at the station each weekday.

=== Decline ===
After World War II and the nationalisation of the railways in January 1948, passenger traffic from the station declined and the number of station calls with it, though four southbound London expresses and five from the capital still featured in the station's 1965 timetable. The 1963 Beeching Report recommended that the Peak District main line to Matlock and Derby be closed, as it duplicated the West Coast Main Line between Manchester Piccadilly and London Euston, which had recently been electrified. The Hope Valley route was also earmarked for closure in the report, but this was not implemented by the government due to the number of isolated communities it served along its route; the Woodhead line was later closed to passenger services in the 1980s instead. The 1902 line through Heaton Mersey to Manchester Central and the link via Romiley to Stockport Tiviot Dale would also close; all trains henceforth ran to Piccadilly via New Mills and Marple instead.

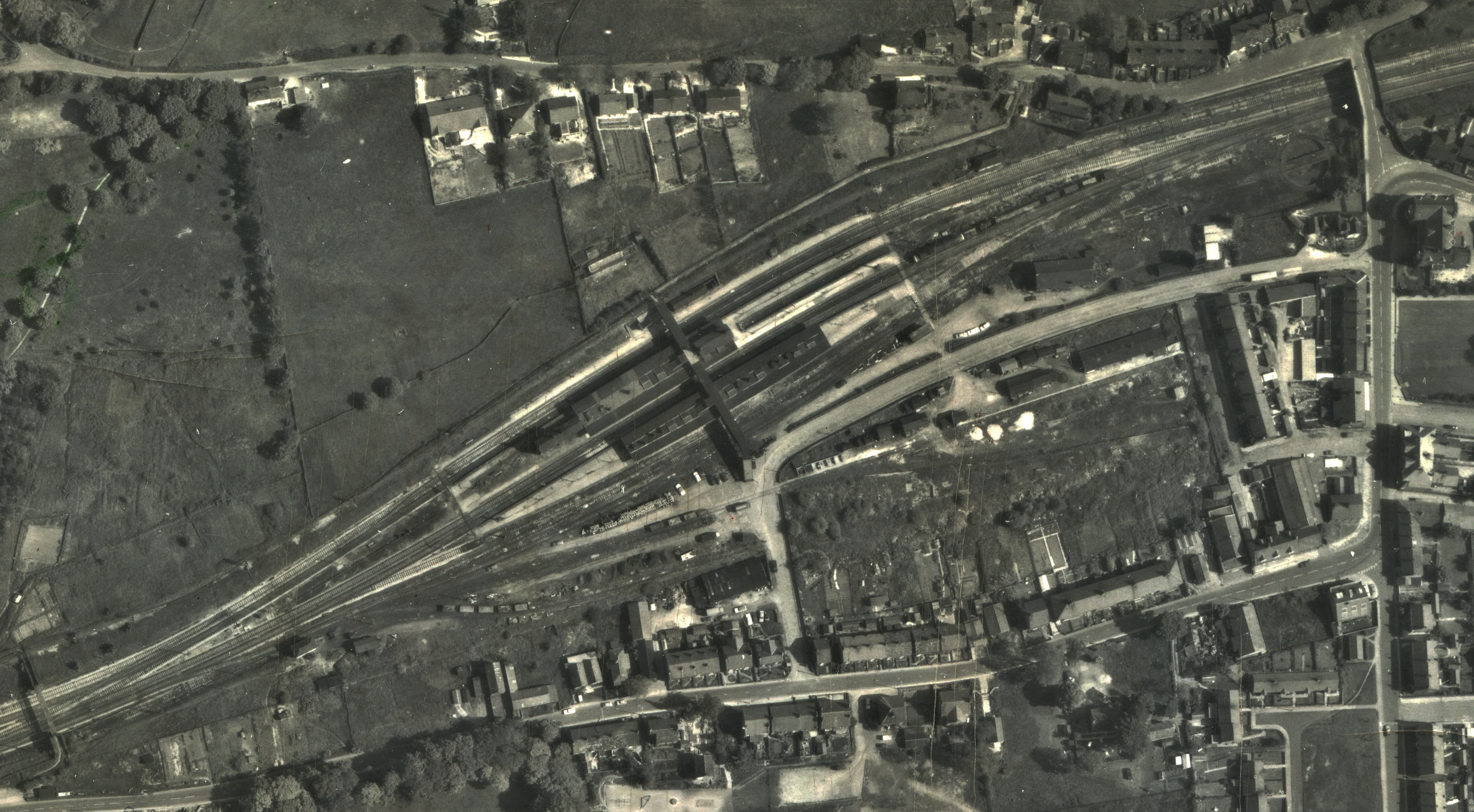
An aerial photograph of Chinley in 1969 - showing the extent of the station at that time

With the closure of the line to the south in 1967/8, Chinley railway station lost its importance. Local passenger services to Buxton (Midland), Rowsley and Matlock were withdrawn from 6 March 1967; the route closed to passengers the following year, along with the line to Manchester Central west of Cheadle Heath. The few surviving London trains via Sheffield ceased to call in 1972 and had disappeared altogether by 1979. Two of the four lines through the station were subsequently removed in 1981/2 and the remaining two were then realigned to serve the middle 'island' platform and the remaining buildings were demolished. The site of the southern island platform has been redeveloped and is now occupied by houses.

Since then, it has served as a local commuter station on the Hope Valley Line; the line itself still carries significant quantities of freight traffic in addition to a frequent passenger service. Many freight trains that pass through still use part of the old route to Buxton to access the quarries at Peak Forest; the line through Disley Tunnel was reopened to passenger trains in 1986, when a new chord was opened to link it to the Buxton line at Hazel Grove. Since the summer 2017 timetable, all fast Sheffield to Manchester services use this route in order to call at Stockport, whilst the Marple route is still used by the local stopping services that call here.

== Facilities ==
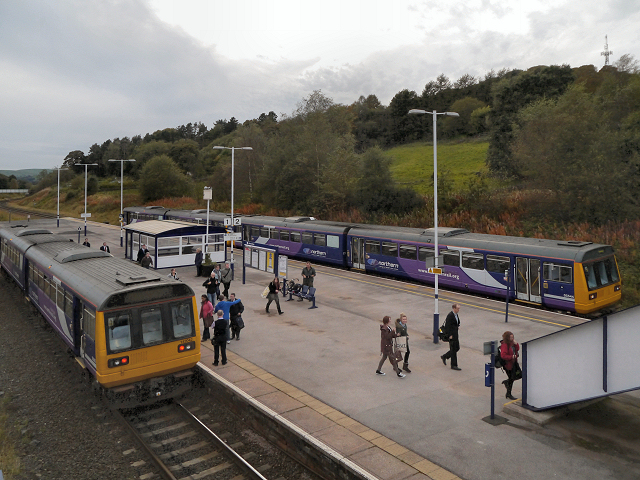
Chinley station serving two pacer trains in 2012

There is a waiting shelter on the platform, along with timetable information posters, CIS displays, ticket vending machine, bench seating and a customer help point. The station has regular platform announcements, although train running details can also be obtained using the telephone at the station entrance.

No level access is available, as the only route from the entrance to the platform is via the stepped footbridge. Local rail users have been campaigning for the station to be made accessible for wheelchair users and parents with pushchairs since 2008, but the necessary funding under the Access for All scheme has not yet been allocated.

== Passenger volume ==
Passenger Volume at Chinley
	2011–12	2012–13	2013–14	2014–15	2015–16	2016–17	2017–18	2018–19	2019–20	2020–21	2021–22	2022–23
Entries and exits	103,154	104,764	108,278	108,582	112,078	120,132	120,676	128,602	129,220	21,856	80,106	93,244
Interchanges	1,565	1,316	892	1,527	1,815	1,800	1,442	1,654	1,168	557	1,446	1,356

The statistics cover twelve month periods that start in April.

== Services ==
The typical service is one train per hour in each direction between Sheffield and Manchester Piccadilly; these stopping services are operated by Northern Trains. One train also starts here in the early morning (heading to Manchester), with a balancing evening working in the opposite direction that finishes here.

Additionally, East Midlands Railway operate a limited number of express trains that stop at Chinley in the morning and early evening, giving the station through links to and from Liverpool Lime Street and Nottingham.

Preceding station	National Rail	Following station
Edale	Northern Trains Hope Valley Line	New Mills Central
Terminus	Northern Trains Hope Valley Line	Hazel Grove Limited service
Edale	East Midlands Railway Liverpool-Norwich Limited service	Hazel Grove
Dore & Totley	East Midlands Railway Liverpool-Norwich Limited service	Stockport
	Disused railways	
Edale; Line and station open	Midland Railway	Buxworth; Line open, station closed
Chapel-en-le-Frith Central; Line and station closed	Midland Railway	Buxworth; Line open, station closed

== Bibliography ==
- Quick, Michael (2023). Railway Passenger Stations in Great Britain: A Chronology (PDF) (5th ed.). London: Railway and Canal Historical Society.
