= Hope Valley Line =

Trans-Pennine railway line in Northern England

- The line at Padley Chapel in the Hope Valley, 2014

Overview
- Status: Operational
- Owner: Network Rail
- Locale: Greater Manchester; Derbyshire; South Yorkshire
- Termini: Manchester Piccadilly; Sheffield
- Stations: 28

Service
- Type: Heavy rail
- System: National Rail
- Operators: East Midlands Railway; Northern Trains; TransPennine Express
- Depot: Longsight
- Rolling stock: Class 150; Class 156; Class 158; Class 170; Class 185; Class 195

History
- Opened: 6 November 1893 (goods); 1 June 1894 (passengers)

Technical
- Num of tracks: Double-track
- Track gauge: 4 ft 8 1/2 in (1,435 mm) standard gauge
- Electrification: 25 kV AC OHLE (western part, from Manchester Piccadilly to Hazel Grove, Ashburys and Guide Bridge)
- Operating speed: 90 mph (140 km/h); 125 mph (201 km/h) (Manchester Piccadilly to Stockport); 40 mph (64 km/h) (Hazel Grove to Edgeley Junction)
Route map
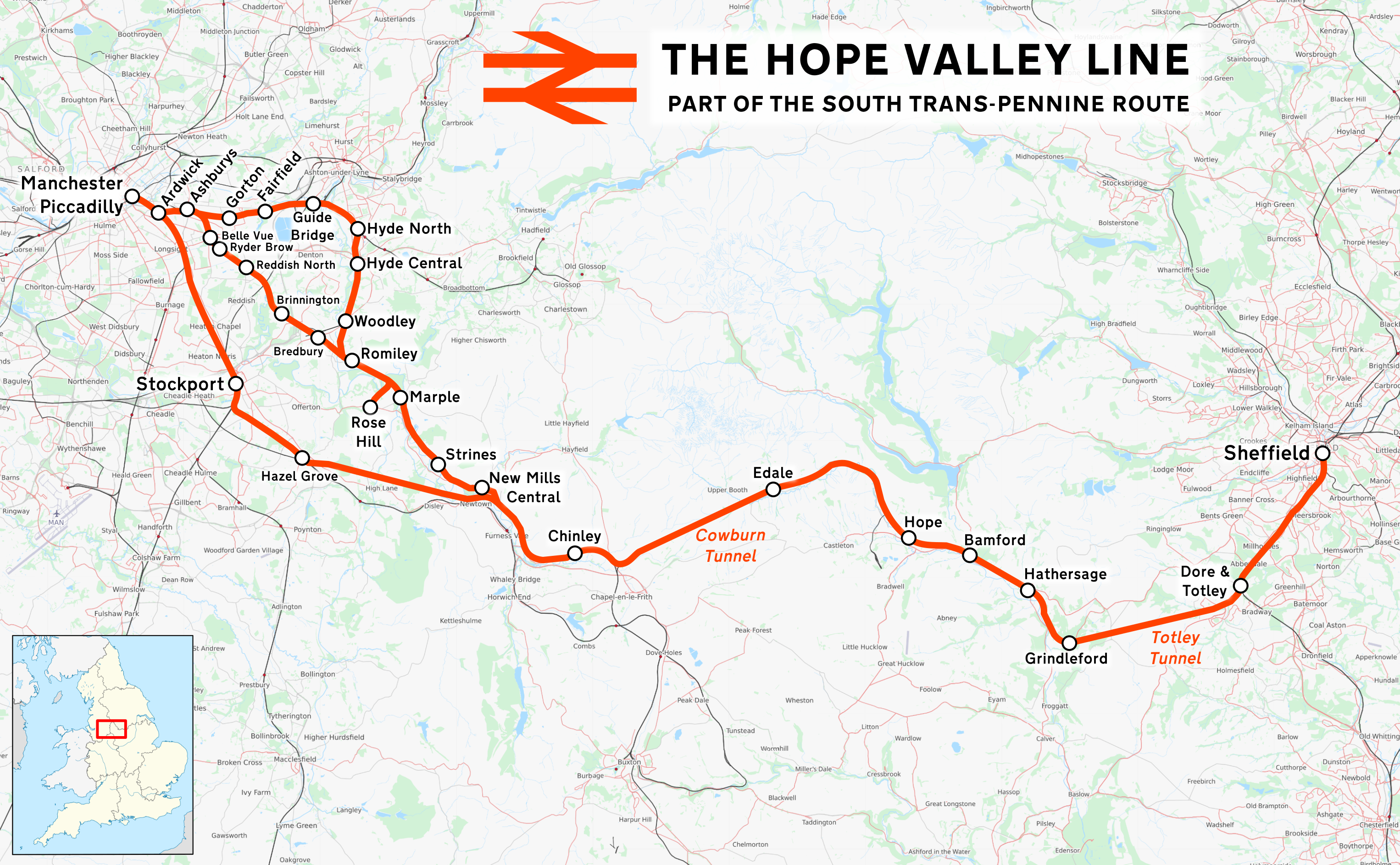
(Click to expand)

The Hope Valley Line is a trans-Pennine railway line in Northern England, linking Manchester with Sheffield. It was completed in 1894.

Passenger services on the line are operated by Northern Trains, East Midlands Railway and TransPennine Express, while the quarries around Hope, producing stone and cement, provide a source of freight traffic.

From Sheffield, the line follows the Midland Main Line through the south-west of the city to Dore & Totley, where the Hope Valley Line branches off to run through the Totley Tunnel, the fourth-longest tunnel in England. It emerges in the Hope Valley area of Derbyshire, where it passes through the stations of Grindleford, Hathersage, Bamford, Hope and Edale before entering the two-mile-long Cowburn Tunnel. From the western portal of the tunnel, the line runs through Chinley, then splits. The northern branch runs via New Mills Central towards Manchester Piccadilly. The southern branch passes through the Disley Tunnel before merging with the Buxton line just south of Hazel Grove and then heading to Stockport to join the West Coast Main Line to Manchester.

== History ==
=== Sheffield and Midland Joint Section ===
This section was built by the Sheffield and Midland Railway Companies' Committee as part of the Midland Railway's drive to reach Manchester with its line from London via Ambergate and Millers Dale. Initially, in 1867, it joined the Manchester, Sheffield and Lincolnshire Railway at Hyde Junction, running into Manchester London Road, but in 1875 a more direct route was built through Bredbury. When Manchester Central was opened by the Cheshire Lines Committee, a new line was built through Heaton Mersey. This third route was closed along with Manchester Central, apart from the section through Disley Tunnel to Hazel Grove, where it now joins the old LNWR line into Stockport.

=== Dore and Chinley ===
Dore and Chinley Railway Act 1884
- Act of Parliament
- Parliament of the United Kingdom
- Long title: An Act to incorporate a Company for the Construction of the Dore and Chinley Railway and for other purposes.
- Citation: 47 & 48 Vict. c. clxxxi

Dates
- Royal assent: 28 July 1884

Text of statute as originally enacted

In 1872, the Midland Railway's only route from Sheffield to Manchester was via Ambergate. It had originally proposed a line to run from Dore to Hassop, meeting its extension from Rowsley to Buxton. However, the "Dore and Chinley Railway" was floated independently in 1872 and, unsuccessfully, until the Midland took an interest, since it would provide a more direct route, connecting through Chinley into Manchester. The line was authorised by the Dore and Chinley Railway Act 1884 (47 & 48 Vict. c. clxxxi) and work began in 1888.

The 21-mile (34 km) line took five years to build, opening to goods traffic in November 1893, with passenger traffic being carried from June 1894. The terrain through Hope Valley and the Vale of Edale was easy enough by Midland standards, but at each end there were formidable obstacles, negotiated by means of the Totley and Cowburn Tunnels.

=== 20th century ===
At the time of the Beeching review, the line was running in competition with the recently modernised and faster Woodhead Line and its closure was suggested. On appeal, British Rail was required to keep the Hope Valley Line open to passenger traffic; it was decided that the Woodhead route would be closed to passenger traffic instead and then subsequently to all traffic in 1981, due to the high cost of further upgrading the line to modern standards.

=== Metrolink proposals ===
In the early 1980s, proposals were put forward to convert the Piccadilly–Belle Vue–Rose Hill/Marple section of the Hope Valley Line to light rail operation for the proposed Manchester Metrolink system. While construction of Metrolink went ahead, the Hope Valley Line was not included in the system which was completed in 1992. When in 2000, proposals for a large-scale extension of Metrolink were announced by the government, these still did not include conversion of the Hope Valley Line; but, subsequently, planning documents from Network Rail and from the Greater Manchester Passenger Transport Authority have suggested that this route might be appropriate for tram-train operation, and, as such, it was suggested to the Department for Transport as a possible location for a national tram-train pilot.

=== August 2019 temporary closure ===
On 1 August 2019, the line was closed between Marple and Sheffield amid fears that the dam at Toddbrook Reservoir would collapse, following heavy rain, which would flood the town of Whaley Bridge. The Buxton line, between Hazel Grove and Buxton, was also closed because of this. The line was re-opened on 7 August 2019.

== 21st century upgrades ==
In 2005 planning applications for various parts of a capacity and modernisation scheme were submitted. In 2015, a consultation pack on the capacity enhancement of the line was released by Network Rail.

=== Proposals for services that bypass Sheffield ===
Nottinghamshire County Council and the Department for Transport have investigated the possibility of adding another service that does not call at Sheffield in order to improve the journey time between Nottingham and Manchester. Stopping (and changing direction) in Sheffield, the fastest journey is 110 minutes (as of 2019), but the council has estimated bypassing Sheffield would cut the time to 85 minutes. Suggested improvements on a 2 1/2-mile (4 km) stretch near Stockport may reduce journey times by 2–3 minutes.

=== Hope Valley route upgrade ===
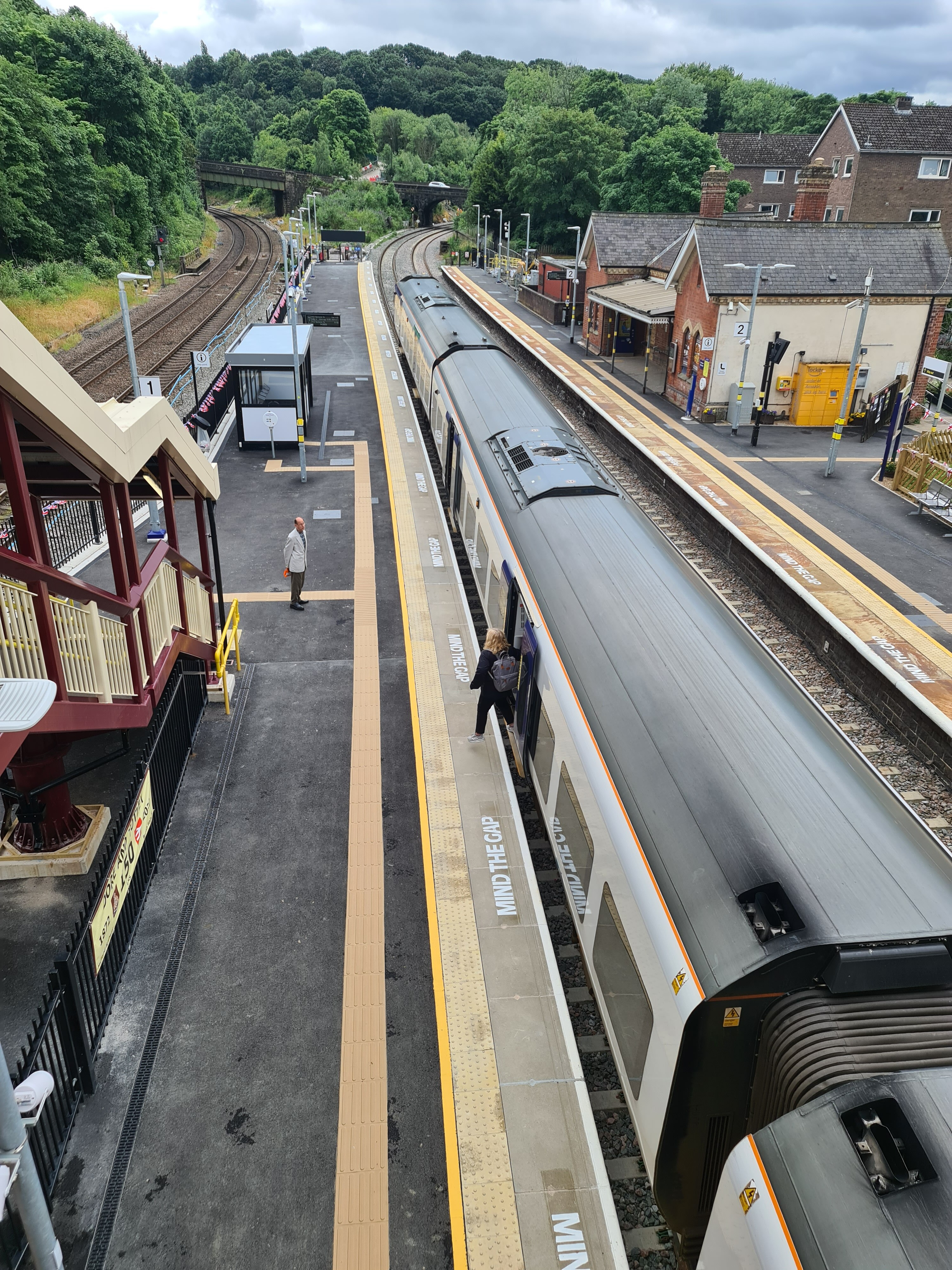
The rebuilt second platform (left) and new track (beneath train) at Dore & Totley railway station. The Midland main line is on the far left.

There was a lack of capacity on this line with the 1985 singling of the track and removal of the island platform at Dore having caused a major bottleneck. In March 2021, it was announced by Minister of State for Transport, Andrew Stephenson, that £137 million would be allocated to upgrade the line. Work started in May 2022 and was completed in April 2024. The enhancements are as follows.

- A capacity increase with new passing loop line between Bamford and Hathersage allowing passenger trains to overtake slower freight trains of up to 640-metres long.
- A capacity increase with the reinstatement of the second track and platform at Dore & Totley station replacing those that were removed in the 1980s. The existing platform was extended to accommodate six-car trains. The two platforms are now joined by an accessible footbridge.
- A safety improvement with a new overbridge at Hathersage West replacing a foot crossing.
- A new signalling system covering the 13 miles between Stockport and New Mills allowing trains to travel at a higher speed.

== Freight ==
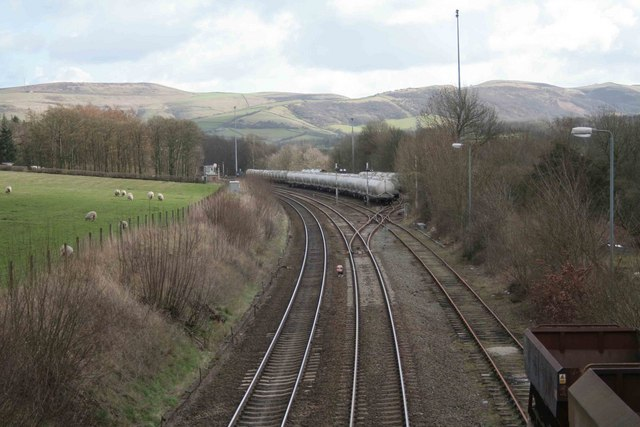
Earle's Sidings at Hope

Around 66% of the works output (1,000,000 tonnes (1,100,000 tons) per year) of cement from Hope Cement Works a year is taken away by rail from the seven-road Earle's Sidings at Hope. When G & T Earle opened Earle's Cement works in 1929, it was linked to the Hope Valley Line by a 1 mi 52 chains (2.7 km) single track railway, which was worked by steam until 1963. Most of the cement now travels over it in trains hauled by Class 20 locomotives to Earle's Sidings, where it is taken over by Freightliner.

== Services ==
The following passenger services traverse all or part of the Hope Valley Line:

Northern Trains
Route	tph	Calling at	Stock
Manchester Piccadilly to Sheffield	1	Reddish North, Brinnington, Bredbury, Romiley, Marple, New Mills Central, Chinley, Edale, Hope, Bamford, Hathersage, Grindleford and Dore & Totley; *Some services do not call at some or all of Edale, Bamford, Hathersage, Grindleford and Dore & Totley giving some 2-hour gaps between services at these stations.	150; 156; 195
Manchester Piccadilly to Rose Hill Marple	4/3	Gorton, Fairfield (1tph), Guide Bridge, Hyde North (1tph), Hyde Central, Woodley and Romiley	150; 156; 195
Manchester Piccadilly to New Mills Central	1	Ashburys, Belle Vue (irregular), Ryder Brow, Reddish North, Brinnington, Bredbury, Romiley, Marple and Strines (1tp2h)	150; 156; 195

East Midlands Railway
Route	tph	Calling at	Stock
Liverpool Lime Street – Norwich	1	Liverpool South Parkway, Widnes, Warrington Central, Manchester Oxford Road, Manchester Piccadilly, Stockport, Sheffield (trains reverse), Chesterfield, Alfreton, Nottingham, Grantham, Peterborough, Ely (trains reverse), Thetford	158; 170

TransPennine Express
Route	tph	Calling at	Stock
Liverpool Lime Street to Cleethorpes	1	Liverpool Lime Street, Liverpool South Parkway, Warrington Central, Birchwood, Irlam, Urmston, Manchester Oxford Road, Manchester Piccadilly, Stockport, Sheffield, Meadowhall Interchange, Doncaster, Scunthorpe, Barnetby, Habrough, Grimsby Town; Some trains also call at Dore & Totley; 2tpd start at Manchester Airport	185

== See also ==
- Great Rocks Line
- Transpennine Route Upgrade
