= Bamford railway station =

Railway station in Derbyshire, England

Bamford
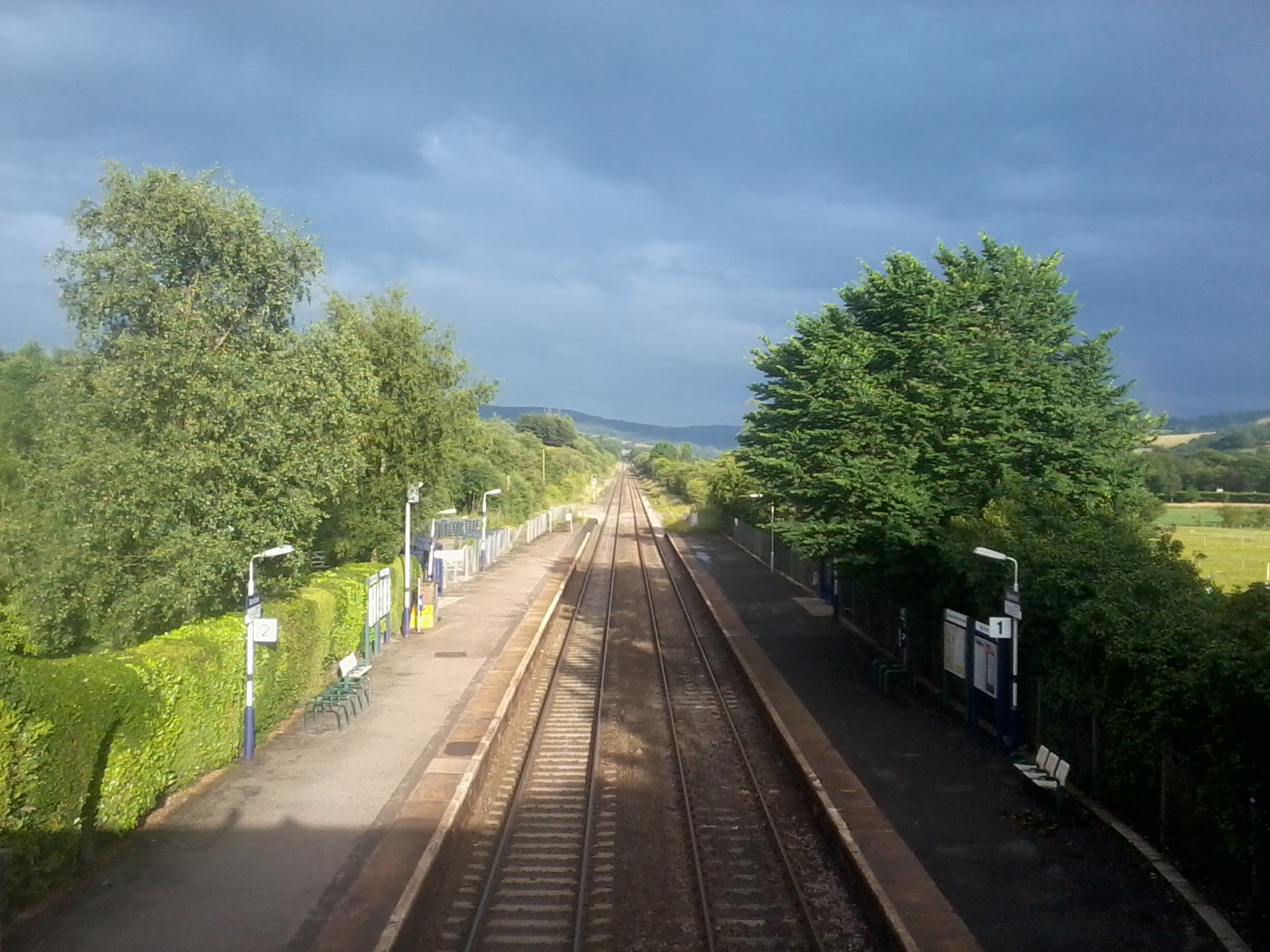

General information
- Location: Bamford, High Peak; England
- Coordinates: 53.3389°N 1.6890°W
- Grid reference: SK208825
- Managed by: Northern Trains
- Platforms: 2

Other information
- Station code: BAM
- Classification: DfT category F2

History
- Original company: Dore and Chinley Railway
- Pre-grouping: Midland Railway
- Post-grouping: London, Midland and Scottish Railway

Key dates
- 25 June 1894: Station opened

Passengers
- 2020/21: ▼20,208
- 2021/22: ▲45,520
- 2022/23: ▲49,270
- 2023/24: ▲68,984
- 2024/25: ▲72,778
Location
Notes
- Passenger statistics from the Office of Rail and Road

Bamford railway station serves the village of Bamford in the Derbyshire Peak District, in England and is managed by Northern Trains. It is located 13 miles (21 km) west of Sheffield on the Hope Valley Line.

== History ==
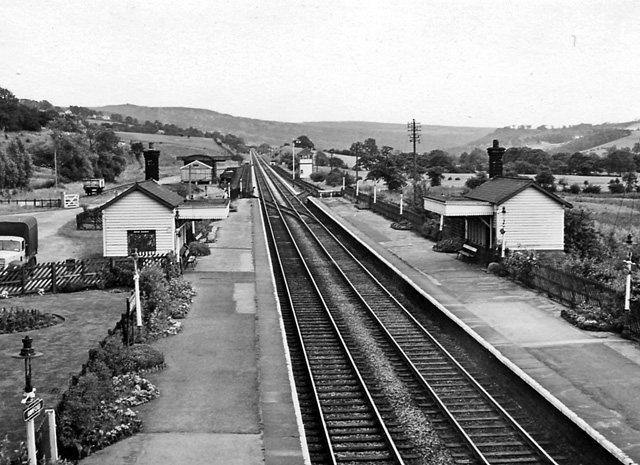
The view in 1966

Bamford station was built by the Dore and Chinley Railway, a company which was absorbed by the Midland Railway prior to opening. The line was opened for goods traffic on 6 November 1893, and for passenger trains on 1 June 1894, but Bamford station was not opened until 25 June that year.

The Dore and Chinley line later became known as the Hope Valley Line. The station became an unstaffed halt in 1969 when the last station master purchased the Station House. The main station building was located on the road overbridge, and was removed during the late 1970s.

== Facilities ==
The station is unstaffed as noted, but Northern has installed ticket vending machines here to allow intending travellers to buy tickets before boarding. Standard waiting shelters are provided on each platform, whilst train running details are offered via help points, automatic announcements and timetable posters. Step-free access is available to both platforms (the eastbound one via a ramp from Station Road).

== Service ==
The typical service is one train per hour in each direction between Sheffield and Manchester Piccadilly; these stopping services are operated by Northern Trains. Trains to Sheffield take around 22 minutes and trains to Manchester Piccadilly take around 53 minutes.

Additionally, East Midlands Railway operate a limited number of express trains that stop at Bamford in the morning and early evening, giving the station direct links to and from Liverpool Lime Street and Nottingham.

Preceding station	National Rail	Following station
Hathersage	Northern Trains Hope Valley Line	Hope
Hathersage	East Midlands Railway Liverpool-Norwich Limited service	Hope
