= Bredbury railway station =

Railway station in Greater Manchester, England

Coordinates: 53.4230°N 2.1105°W

Bredbury
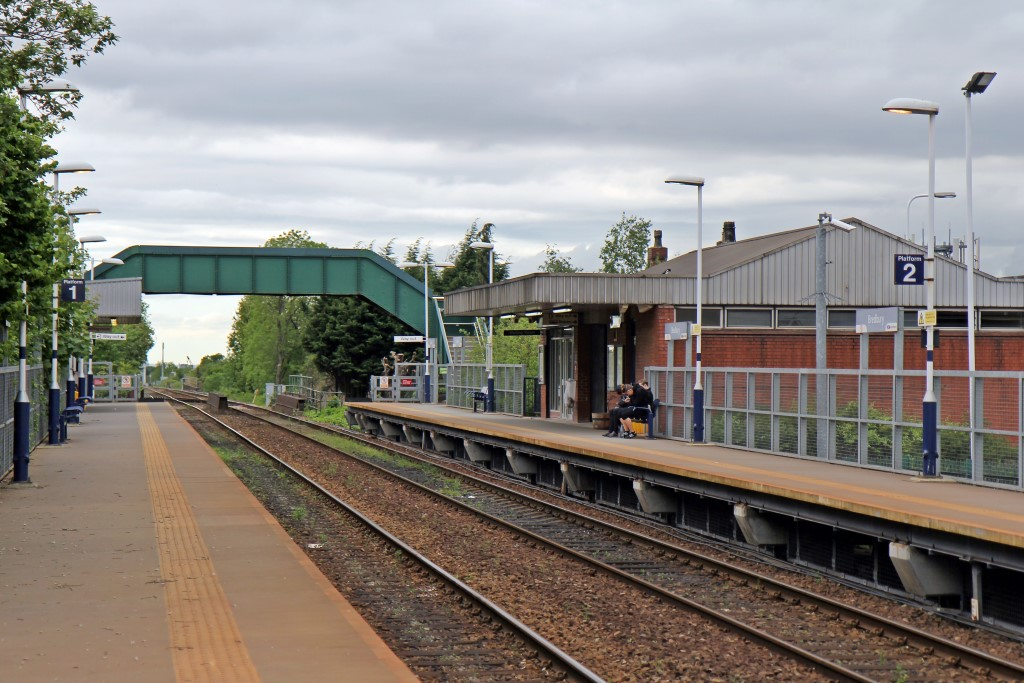
- Bredbury railway station in 2015

General information
- Location: Bredbury, Metropolitan Borough of Stockport; England
- Grid reference: SJ927918
- Managed by: Northern Trains
- Transit authority: Greater Manchester
- Platforms: 2

Other information
- Station code: BDY
- Classification: DfT category E

History
- Opened: 1875

Passengers
- 2020/21: ▼48,242
- 2021/22: ▲0.141 million
- 2022/23: ▲0.156 million
- 2023/24: ▲0.193 million
- 2024/25: ▼0.172 million
Location
Notes
- Passenger statistics from the Office of Rail and Road

Bredbury railway station serves the town of Bredbury in the Metropolitan Borough of Stockport, Greater Manchester, England. It is on the Hope Valley Line between Manchester Piccadilly, New Mills Central and Sheffield.

== History ==
Location (red dot) within Stockport's historical rail network

It was built by the Sheffield and Midland Railway Companies' Committee in 1875, on the line between New Mills Central and Manchester London Road (since renamed Piccadilly).

The station was modernised in 1976; the buildings on the eastbound side were replaced and the platforms were raised, with the result that the old waiting room on the Manchester side is three steps lower down. The original stationmaster's house survives, as does the 1916 footbridge.

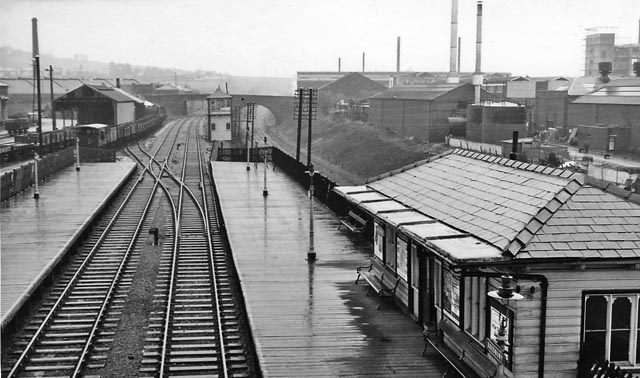
The station in 1965

== Facilities ==
The ticket office on the eastbound side is staffed through the day on weekdays (06:20-20:50) and on Saturdays until early afternoon (07:20-14:20). Outside of these times, tickets must be bought on the train, prior to travel or on-line.

Waiting shelters are present on each platform and train running details are offered via automated announcements, digital information screens and timetable posters. No step-free access is available; the ramp from the car park to the ticket hall has steps, as does the footbridge.

== Service ==
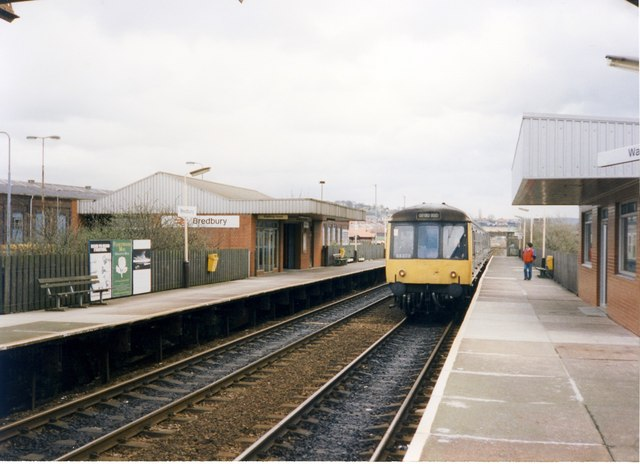
The station in 1989

There are generally two trains per hour northbound to Manchester Piccadilly and two southbound towards New Mills Central, with hourly extensions to Sheffield. On Sundays, there is an hourly service between Manchester Piccadilly and Sheffield.

| Preceding station | National Rail | Following station |
|---|---|---|
| Brinnington | Northern Trains Hope Valley Line | Romiley |
