= Hope railway station (England) =

Railway station in Derbyshire, England

Coordinates: 53.346°N 1.729°W

Hope (Derbyshire)
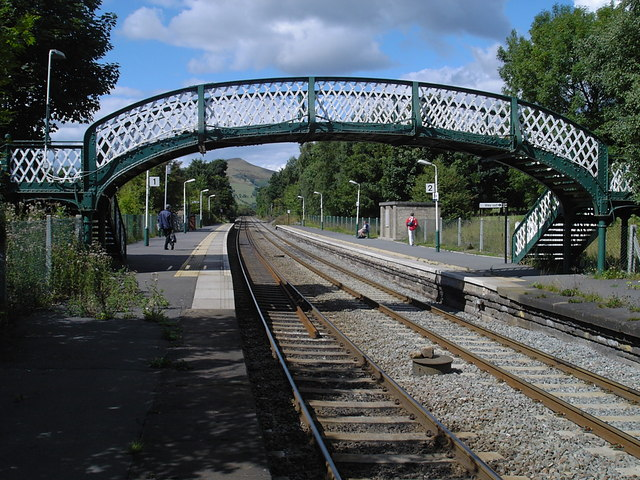

General information
- Location: Hope, High Peak; England
- Grid reference: SK180832
- Managed by: Northern Trains
- Platforms: 2

Other information
- Station code: HOP
- Classification: DfT category F2

History
- Opened: 1894

Passengers
- 2020/21: ▼21,814
- 2021/22: ▲68,514
- 2022/23: ▲76,240
- 2023/24: ▲90,516
- 2024/25: ▲97,946
Location
Notes
- Passenger statistics from the Office of Rail and Road

Hope railway station serves the villages of Hope and Brough in the Derbyshire Peak District of England, 14 3/4 miles (23.7 km) west of Sheffield.

The station lies between the two villages, Hope and Brough, around 0.6 miles (1 km) east of Hope, and also serves Bradwell and Castleton; the latter being a notable tourist spot, famous for its caverns and the gemstone called Blue John.

Just west of Hope, the line passes between Win Hill (1,523 feet (464 m)) and Lose Hill (1,563 feet (476 m)). Also, a short distance to the west, is Earle's Sidings; this is the exchange yard for the privately owned and operated 2 miles (3.2 km) long branch line to the Hope Cement factory and quarry sited south of Hope village.

== History ==
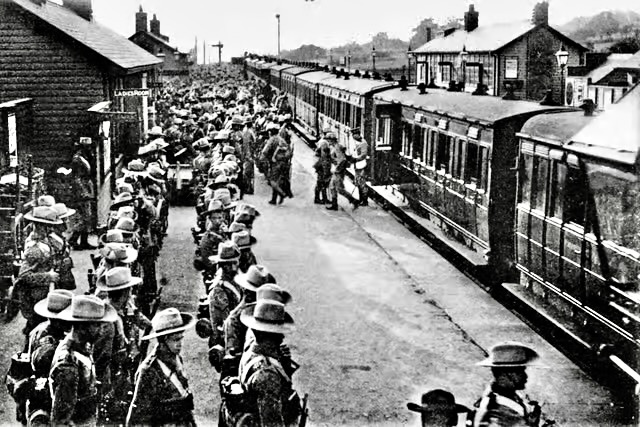
Soldiers at Hope station in 1904

The station was opened in 1894 on the Midland Railway's Dore and Chinley line, now known as the Hope Valley Line. It was reduced to unstaffed halt status in 1969 and has lost its station buildings.

The station was renamed from Hope Village to Hope on 6 May 1974. The summer 1961 timetable showed it as Hope (for Castleton & Bradwell). At that time, North Western and Pashley provided connecting buses to those villages to meet most trains.

=== Station masters ===
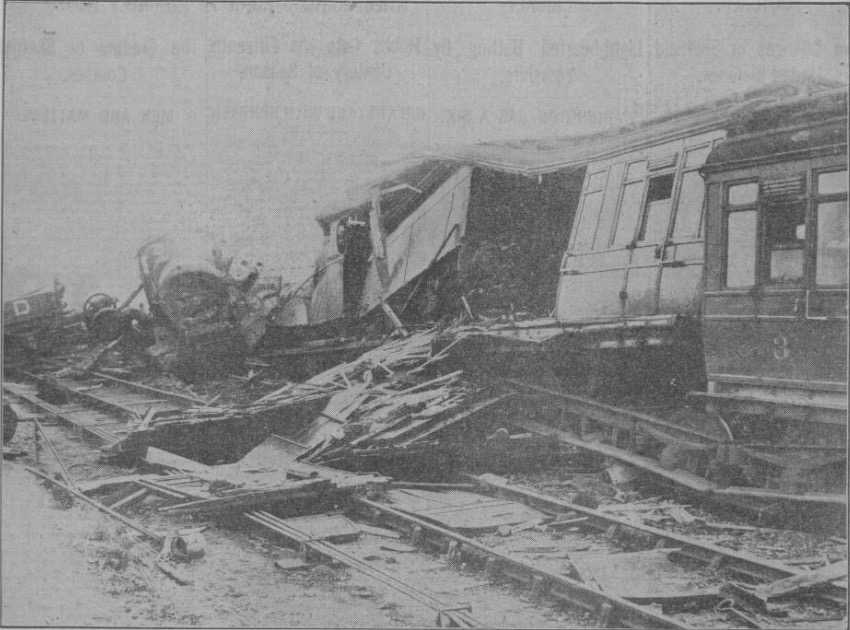
Photograph of the wreckage from the Sheffield Daily Telegraph 4 September 1925

On 3 September 1925, the new station master, Mr Thompson, had only been in the post a few days when three people were killed and 14 injured in a collision at the station. The 3:00pm Manchester to Sheffield express collided with a stationary ballast train at Hope station. The driver and fireman of the passenger train, George Wolfe and Joseph Richard Henderson, were killed along with a platelayer, James Herbert Chapman.

The verdict at the inquest, held by Colonel Alan Mount of the Ministry of Transport, was that the signalman on duty, Alexander Adams, was responsible for the accident which occurred through negligence due to a temporary lapse of memory, but there was no criminal responsibility. The signalman had been distracted by a requirement to take a telegraph message for the signalman at Bamford who had been in the post for four years, but was not trained in telegraphy.

- John Ross 1896 - 1925
- Mr. Thompson from 1925 (formerly station master at Manton near Willington)
- F.K. Upton from 1953 (formerly station master at Wingfield).

== Facilities ==
The station is unstaffed; however, Northern installed automatic ticket vending machines at the station in 2018 to allow passengers to buy tickets before boarding. The only remaining structures here are a lattice footbridge and standard shelters on each platform (only parts of each one are now in use). Train running information is provided via CIS displays, automated announcements, a pay phone and timetable poster boards. No step-free access is available to either platform.

== Service ==
The off-peak service Monday to Saturday is typically one train per hour in each direction between Sheffield and Manchester Piccadilly; until 2018, the service was generally two-hourly on weekdays. On Sundays, the service is two-hourly in the morning but increases to hourly in the afternoon.

East Midlands Railway call here with the first service of the day to Manchester and also on the final return working. All other services are provided by Northern Trains. A normal weekday service operates on most bank holidays.

Preceding station	National Rail	Following station
Bamford	Northern Trains Manchester Piccadilly - Sheffield	Edale
Bamford	East Midlands Railway Liverpool to Norwich (train splits at Nottingham) (Limited service)	Edale
