= Marple railway station =

Railway station in Greater Manchester, England

Marple
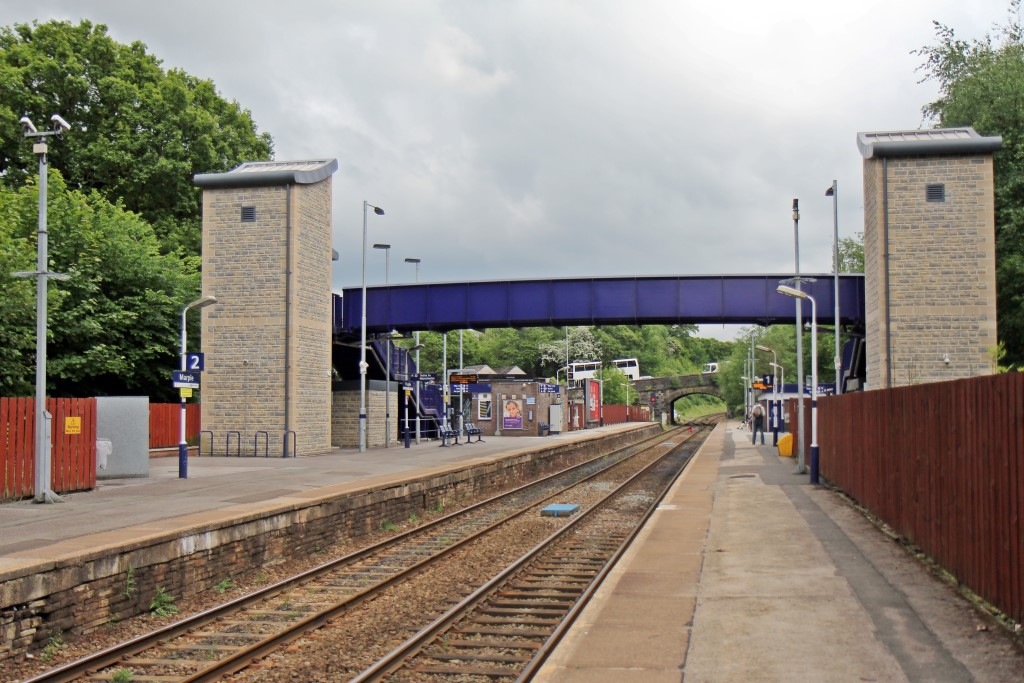
- A view of the station, 2015

General information
- Location: Marple, Metropolitan Borough of Stockport, England
- Coordinates: 53.401°N 2.057°W
- Manager: Northern Trains
- Transit authority: Transport for Greater Manchester
- Platforms: 2

Other information
- Station code: MPL
- Classification: DfT category D

History
- Opened: 1865

Passengers
- 2021/22: ▲0.264 million
- 2022/23: ▲0.306 million
- 2023/24: ▲0.352 million
- 2024/25: ▼0.326 million
- 2025/26: ▲0.407 million
Location
Notes
- Passenger statistics from the Office of Rail and Road

Marple railway station serves the town of Marple, in Greater Manchester, England. It lies on the Hope Valley Line, around 9 miles (14 km) south-east of Manchester Piccadilly. The station was opened in 1865 by the Manchester, Sheffield and Lincolnshire Railway; it was demolished and rebuilt in 1970.

It is managed and served by Northern Trains, which generally provides two trains per hour in each direction. Rose Hill Marple also serves the town at the end of a short spur of the Hope Valley Line, which continued towards Macclesfield until 1970.

== History ==
Location (red dot) within Stockport's historical rail network

Marple station was built by the Manchester, Sheffield and Lincolnshire Railway (MS&LR) on the extension of its Hyde branch to New Mills; it opened on 1 July 1865.

The line was built in conjunction with the Midland Railway's extension of its line to Millers Dale, thus it was also used by its trains between London St Pancras and Manchester Store Street (later called London Road and now Piccadilly). Until the Midland moved to Manchester Central in 1880, as a member of the Cheshire Lines Committee, Marple was where carriages to or from Liverpool would be attached or detached.

At the time, it had extensive station buildings, the Midland waiting room having upholstered seats and a coal fire in an attractive fireplace for cold winter days. It was rebuilt in 1970 and the MS&LR facilities were demolished, with new brick buildings replacing the Midland's offices.

The direct passenger railway service to Manchester Central, via the Bredbury Curve and Stockport Tiviot Dale, ended in January 1967.

From Marple to Romiley, the line passes through Marple Tunnel to the junction with the short branch to Rose Hill Marple; it then takes the 308-yard (282 m)-long stone viaduct that crosses the river Goyt and the Peak Forest Canal, alongside the Marple Aqueduct.

=== Agatha Christie's Miss Marple ===
In 1902, when Agatha Christie was twelve, her sister Margaret married James Watts and they lived at Abney Hall, Cheadle. Christie, encouraged by Watts to write, was a frequent visitor to Abney Hall from a young age into adulthood. The area around the hall and Cheadle inspired many settings within her books.

From her home in Devon, Christie often used the railway to travel there, connecting from the Midland Main Line from London St Pancras onto the Hope Valley Line, and passing through Marple. It is theorised that a train was delayed there for long enough for the station sign to stick in her mind, only to resurface in 1927 at the publication of the first short story featuring Jane Marple. Christie later wrote that she took the name from Marple Hall, after attending an auction there while staying with her sister at Abney Hall; however, the auction took place in July 1929, over a year after the first Miss Marple story had been published.

=== Failed Metro plans in 2008 ===
As part of Manchester's Transport Innovation Fund bid in 2008, which would see a weekday peak time congestion charge introduced on roads into the city centre in order for a £3bn injection into the region's public transport, Marple would have seen an increase to four services per hour in both directions throughout the day to Manchester Piccadilly. The line would have effectively been run as a metro-style operation, offering users of Marple and other stations along the route the ease of showing up without needing to know exact departure times.

The rejection of the TIF plans in a public referendum in December 2008 (by a 4:1 majority) led to the plans being abandoned in April 2010. None of the station improvements were delivered therefore, despite the comparatively high usage of this suburban station.

=== Passenger usage ===
In 2024/25, 325,750 entries and exits were recorded at the station, making it the sixth busiest within the Metropolitan Borough of Stockport and the third busiest on the Hope Valley Line after Manchester Piccadilly and Sheffield. This represents a decrease from 455,470 in 2014/15, driven in part by the decrease in the use of public transport following the outbreak of the COVID-19 pandemic and the subsequent increase in uptake of home working.

== Location ==
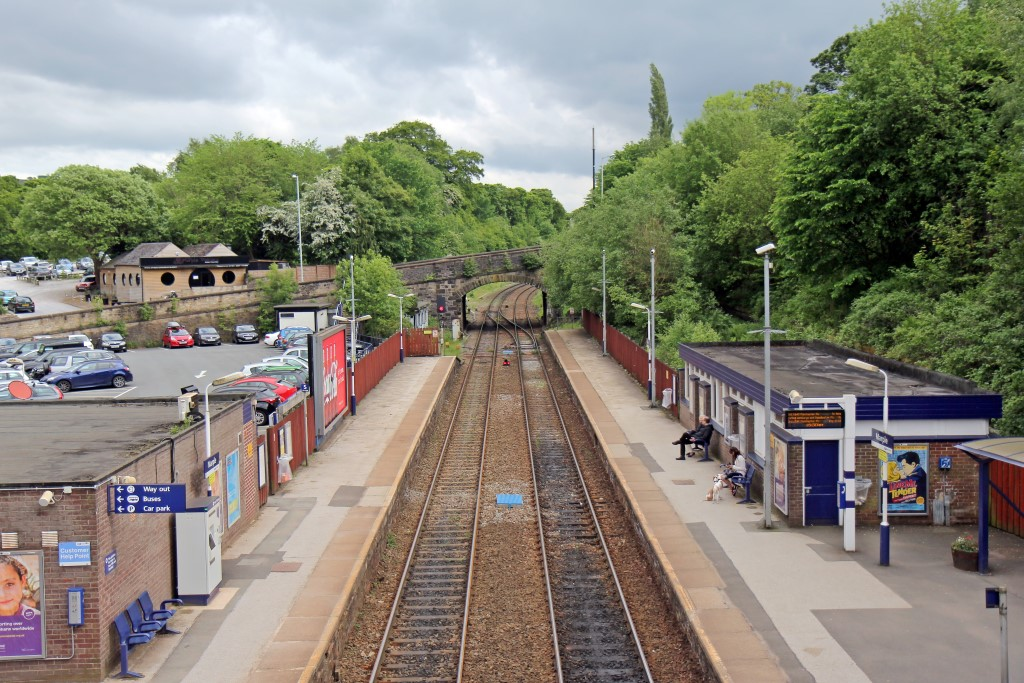
The station from the footbridge

The station is sited to the north-east of Marple, by Marple Bridge, Brabyns Park and the Peak Forest Canal. The A626 runs over a bridge next to the station and provides access to the town centre.

== Layout and facilities ==
The station has two side platforms, each 153 yards (140 m) long; platform 1 can only be reached by a footbridge, with lifts to enable step-free access, and platform 2 can be accessed directly from the ticket office.

The ticket office is staffed during the day; there are benches, toilets and a waiting room on the platform. Passenger information systems include dot-matrix displays and an automated public-address system announces approaching services. Timetable information posters are provided and help points allow passengers to contact railway staff.

To the east of the station, there is a car park and the nearest bus stops are 150 metres (160 yd) away on Brabyns Brow. Bus routes 383, 384 and 385, operated by Stagecoach Manchester, connect the station with Stockport town centre.

== Services ==
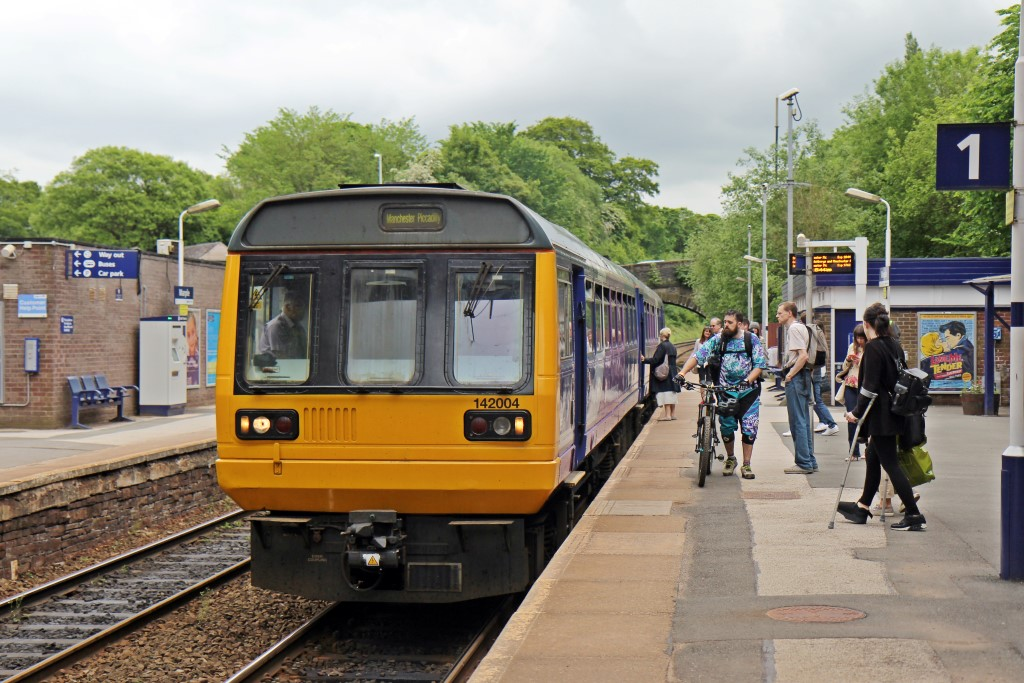
A Northern Rail Pacer unit calls at the station in 2015; these units have since been retired from the route

Northern Trains operates the following general off-peak service, in trains per hour (tph):

- 2 tph to Manchester Piccadilly, via Bredbury
- 2 tph to New Mills Central; of which:
  - 1 tph continues to Sheffield, through the Hope Valley.

On Sundays, there is 1 tph in each direction between Manchester Piccadilly and Sheffield.

All services that stop at Marple are operated with diesel multiple units, as the Hope Valley Line is not electrified beyond the eastern edge of Manchester; a mixture of Class 150, 156 and 195 units are used.

Preceding station	National Rail	Following station
Strines	Northern Trains Hope Valley Line	Romiley
New Mills Central	Northern Trains Hope Valley Line	Romiley
