= New Mills Central railway station =

Railway station in Derbyshire, England

New Mills Central
- Northern Civity & Sprinter units call at the station.

General information
- Location: New Mills, High Peak, England
- Coordinates: 53.365°N 2.006°W
- Grid reference: SJ997853
- Manager: Northern Trains
- Platforms: 2

Other information
- Station code: NMC
- Classification: DfT category E

History
- Original company: Marple, New Mills and Hayfield Junction Railway
- Pre-grouping: Great Central and Midland Joint Committee
- Post-grouping: Joint LNER/LMS

Key dates
- 1 July 1865: Opened as New Mills
- 25 August 1952: Renamed New Mills Central

Passengers
- 2020/21: ▼42,654
- Interchange: ▼582
- 2021/22: ▲0.147 million
- Interchange: ▲2,721
- 2022/23: ▲0.175 million
- Interchange: ▼2,507
- 2023/24: ▲0.208 million
- Interchange: ▲2,884
- 2024/25: ▼0.162 million
- Interchange: ▼2,082
Location
Notes
- Passenger statistics from the Office of Rail and Road

New Mills Central railway station serves the town of New Mills, in Derbyshire, England. It lies on the Hope Valley Line between Manchester Piccadilly and Sheffield, 12 3/4 miles (20.5 km) east of the former. The town is also served by New Mills Newtown on the Buxton Line.

== History ==
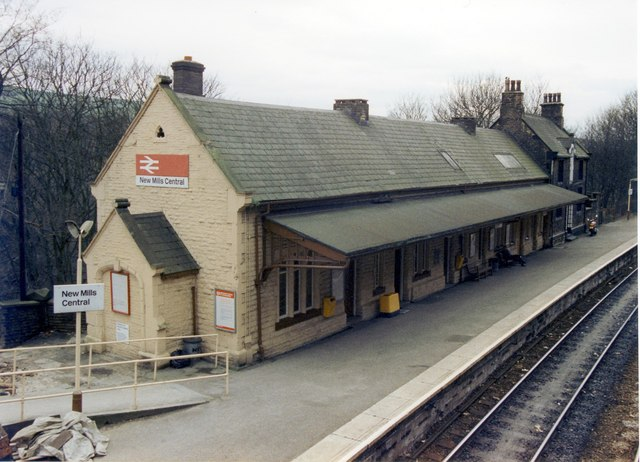
The main northbound station building and canopy (1989)

In the mid-19th century, the Manchester, Buxton, Matlock and Midland Junction Railway ran as far as Rowsley and was extended by the Midland Railway to Buxton, in its aim to run as far as Manchester. The Manchester, Sheffield & Lincolnshire Railway (MS&LR) also wished to extend southwards from its main line through the Woodhead Tunnel to Sheffield Victoria and had built a branch to Hyde Central. Meanwhile, the London and North Western Railway had constructed its own line to Buxton from Whaley Bridge, with a station at New Mills Newtown, which effectively blocked the other two.

An agreement was reached whereby the MS&LR would build their proposed Marple, New Mills and Hayfield Junction Railway, while the Midland Railway would extend its line to New Mills from Millers Dale, via Chinley. Passenger services to Hayfield commenced in 1868 and the line came under joint control as the Sheffield and Midland Railway Companies' Committee in 1870, while the Midland's line opened in 1867.

The buildings on the down side are extant, as is the stationmaster's house built in 1864. The line to London St Pancras through Millers Dale was closed in 1967 and the Hayfield branch closed in January 1970, but the station still serves the Hope Valley Line services between Sheffield and Manchester. Stopping trains from Sheffield formerly terminated here and those passengers wishing to travel onwards to Manchester had to change trains. (Note: Most express services between Sheffield and Manchester ran through the station without stopping.) This practice ceased, however, when through trains were diverted via Hazel Grove and Stockport in 1986.

Although the Hayfield branch is now closed, as is the tunnel, (Note: A stub of the old branch line through the tunnel was used for some years afterwards, as a turnback siding for trains terminating here.) users can still travel most of its route on foot, bicycle or horse, along what is now known as the Sett Valley Trail.

== Layout and facilities ==
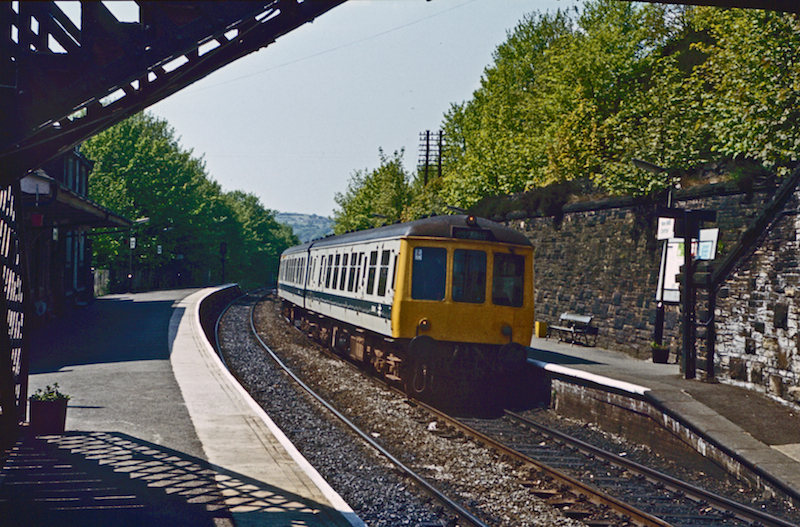
A diesel multiple unit calls at the eastbound platform (May 1980)

The station lies at the junction of what was the Hayfield branch and the Midland line; the two appearing through tunnels on a ledge blasted out of the cliff face, some 40 feet (12.2 m) above the river Goyt.

The station remains a terminus for hourly services from Manchester; these can now return directly from the eastbound platform following signalling alterations in 2007, which also saw the remaining semaphore signals at the station replaced by colour lights. A siding remains at the Marple end of the station to enable empty rolling stock to be stabled clear of the main line.

The booking office is on platform 1. Train information is offered via automated announcements, digital display screens and timetable posters. No level access is available; access to the booking office and platform 1 is via a steep lane from the main road, while platform 2 is accessed by means of a path and flight of steps.

== Services ==
There is now a half-hourly service to Manchester Piccadilly northbound on weekdays and Saturdays, with an hourly stopping eastbound service to Sheffield. An hourly service between Manchester and Sheffield operates in both directions on Sundays.

Preceding station	National Rail	Following station
Strines	Northern Trains Hope Valley Line	Chinley
Strines	Northern Trains Hope Valley Line	Terminus
	Historical railways	
Strines; Line and station open	Midland Railway	Buxworth; Line open, station closed
	Disused railways	
Strines; Line and station open	Manchester, Sheffield and Lincolnshire Railway; Hayfield branch	Birch Vale; Line and station closed
Strines; Line and station open	Midland Railway; Sheffield and Midland Railway Companies' Committee	Birch Vale; Line and station closed
