= Adlington railway station =

Adlington railway station may refer to:

- Adlington railway station (Cheshire)
- Adlington railway station (Lancashire)

== See also ==
- Addington railway stations in Christchurch, New Zealand; see List of Christchurch railway stations § Addington
