= Cheadle Hulme railway station =

Railway station in Greater Manchester, England

Coordinates: 53.3763°N 2.18778°W

Cheadle Hulme
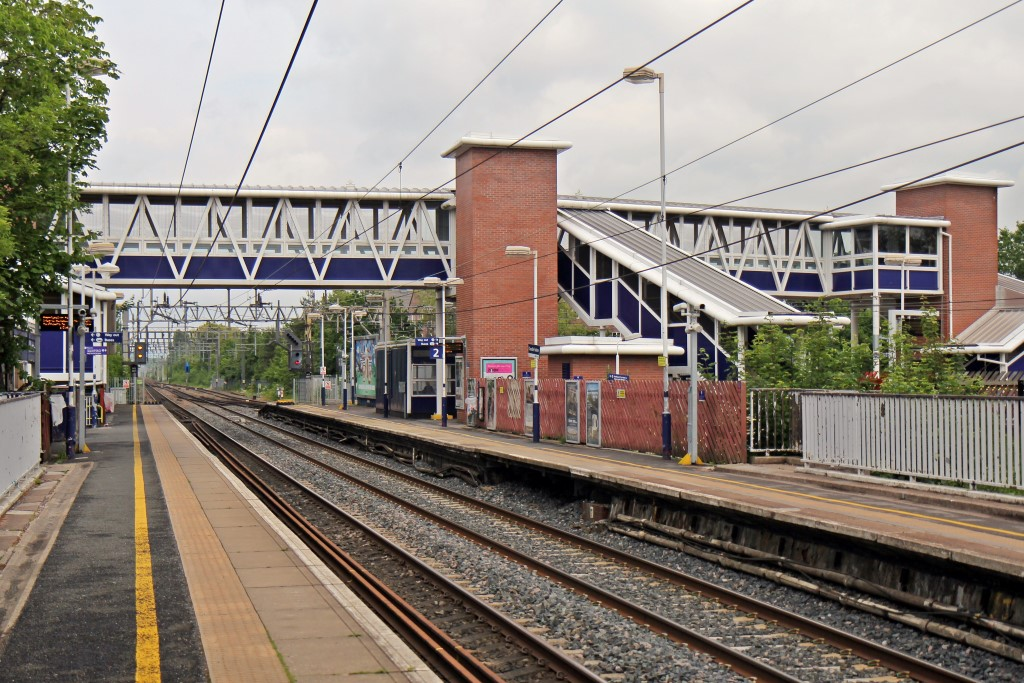
- Platforms 1 and 2, with the footbridge, constructed in 2011, clearly visible in the background.

General information
- Location: Cheadle Hulme, Metropolitan Borough of Stockport, England
- Grid reference: SJ875865
- Manager: Northern Trains
- Transit authority: TfGM
- Platforms: 4

Other information
- Station code: CHU
- Classification: DfT category D

Passengers
- 2020/21: ▼0.139 million
- Interchange: ▼1,530
- 2021/22: ▲0.490 million
- Interchange: ▲3,937
- 2022/23: ▲0.564 million
- Interchange: ▲6,267
- 2023/24: ▲0.618 million
- Interchange: ▲6,471
- 2024/25: ▲0.651 million
- Interchange: ▼6,324
Location
Notes
- Passenger statistics from the Office of Rail and Road

Cheadle Hulme railway station serves the suburb of Cheadle Hulme, Greater Manchester, England. It is managed by Northern Trains, which also operates all services that stop here.

Cheadle Hulme's first railway station opened in 1842, when the Manchester and Birmingham Railway to Crewe was completed. With the extension of the line to Macclesfield, and later Stoke-on-Trent, a new station opened in 1845 which has served the area since.

== History ==
=== Background ===
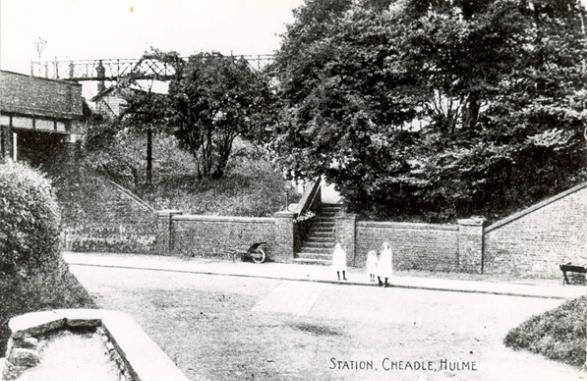
The station front c. 1900

In 1833, Parliament approved the Grand Junction Railway, a railway line to connect Manchester and Birmingham. It opened in 1837, after proposals had been made for more direct routes in 1830 and 1835. The earlier schemes attracted little interest, but two proposals were put forward in late 1835. The two companies, based in Manchester and Birmingham, had to negotiate with each other to develop the proposals; they were altered somewhat over the next two years. In 1837, Parliament approved the final plans for lines to Crewe and Stoke. The companies merged to become the Manchester and Birmingham Railway company, and the first part of the line opened in June 1840. It originally ran from a temporary station at Travis Street in Manchester to a station in Heaton Norris, just north of Stockport. Stockport Viaduct was built over the River Mersey and opened to trains on 10 May 1842. It allowed services to be extended to Sandbach; in the following August, they reached Crewe. Also at this time, a new station opened to serve as the line's northern terminus; it later became Manchester Piccadilly. Edgeley station opened in February 1843, in response to complaints that the Heaton Norris station was "too inconvenient" and it soon became Stockport's busiest station. Three years later, in 1846, the Manchester and Birmingham Railway company merged with two other companies to become the London and North Western Railway.

=== Cheadle station ===
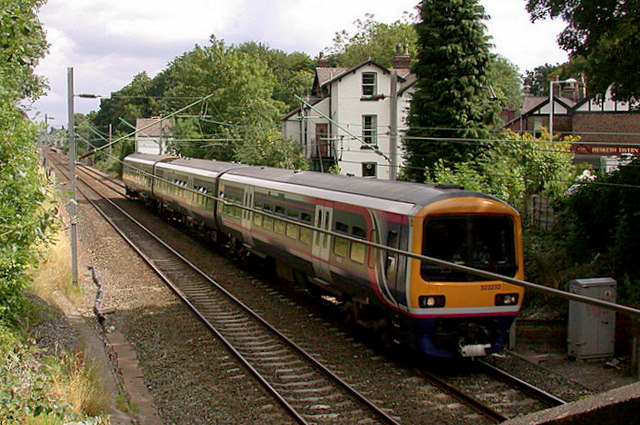
A train passing through Cheadle Hulme towards Handforth; the white building in the background is the original station house.

The original Cheadle Hulme station on the Crewe-Manchester Line, about 0.3 miles (0.5 km) south-west of the current structure, was known simply as Cheadle. It was in use from May 1842, following the opening of the viaduct. The station building, opposite the Hesketh Tavern public house, is now a private residence. It included a structure from which tickets were sold and, in the window of which, a candle was lit to act as a signal during the hours of darkness. This structure, however, no longer exists.

When plans were made for a line to Stoke-on-Trent, it was originally intended for a branch to be built from Stockport to Macclesfield; the junction was built south at Cheadle Hulme instead. The line was constructed over four years; it opened for goods traffic as far as Poynton in June 1845 and it reached Macclesfield on 24 November and was opened to the public. In June 1846, Parliament authorised the completion of the line to Stoke-on-Trent. By June 1849, the section between Congleton and Macclesfield was completed, and the line was finished.

=== New station ===
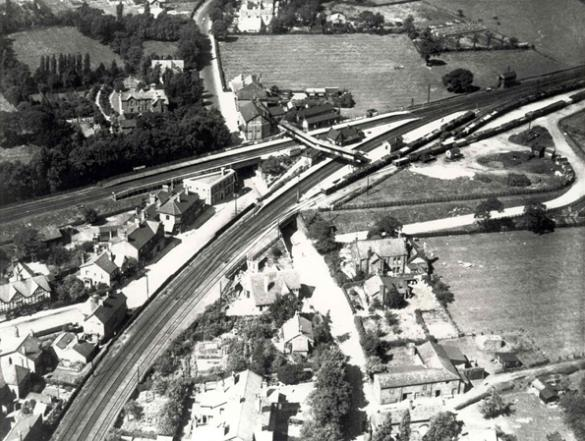
An aerial view of the station, dating from 1927

After the Stoke line opened, the station was rebuilt north-east at the junction so that it could serve both lines. The new station opened on 9 June 1845; at first, southbound services ran to Crewe and Poynton. By November the line had been extended to Macclesfield and, by 1849, when the original station closed, it had reached Stoke-on-Trent. The new station had four platforms and was served by trains running between Manchester and Crewe or Stoke-on-Trent. It was renamed Cheadle Hulme in 1866, to avoid confusion with Cheadle LNW railway station which opened the same year.

Before the arrival of the railway, Cheadle Hulme was a rural and agricultural cluster of hamlets. The railway brought a huge influx of people to the area and provided opportunities for residents to work in places such as Manchester. Cheadle Hulme gradually grew to become a large suburb of over 29,000 people thanks to the railway.

=== Derailments ===
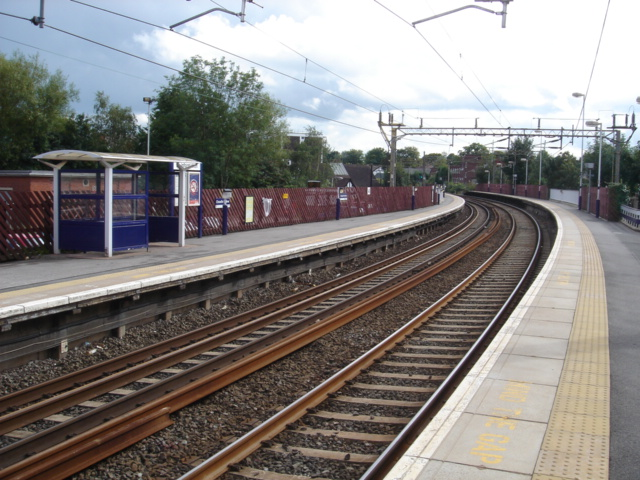
Platforms 3 and 4 on the line to Stoke, facing south; the sharp curve which was the site of the 1964 derailment is clearly visible.

A special train, known as the Lollipop Express, carrying 234 school children from Gnosall, in Stafford, to York for a day trip derailed at the station on 28 May 1964. Three people, including two children, were killed and 27 were injured. The bridge, which carried the line between Macclesfield and Stoke, was in the process of being reconstructed. Passing trains were restricted to a temporary speed limit of 10 mph (16 km/h). A hearing determined that the train's excessive speed had caused the derailment because the train driver was not aware of the speed restriction.

In July 1969, there was another derailment near Cheadle Hulme involving a freight diesel locomotive. No-one was injured, but services to Crewe and Stoke-on-Trent were blocked for several hours.

=== Alterations ===
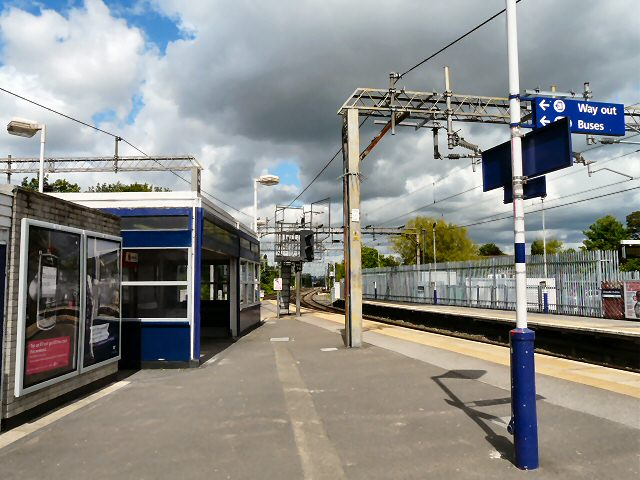
Platform 3 facing towards Stockport. The waiting shelters were originally built to replace buildings, which included a ticket office and waiting room.

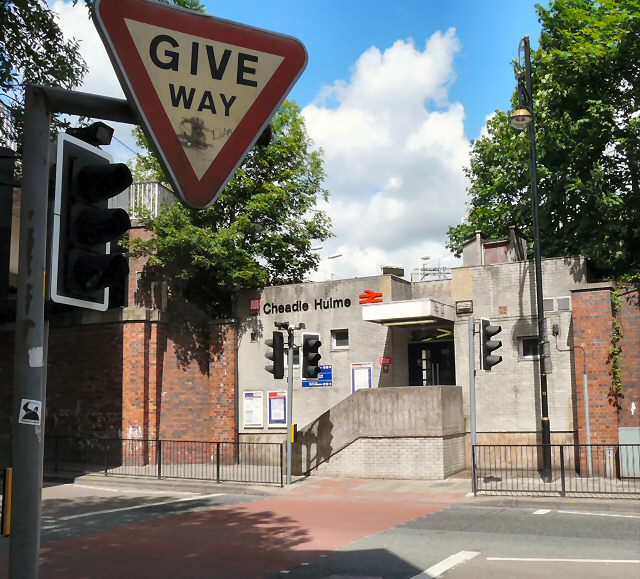
The station front in 2009

The original station was sited above road level, as it is today. Passengers accessed the other two platforms by a footbridge, which was removed after the lines were electrified. Cheadle Hulme was also used as a goods depot until 31 October 1964, when goods trains were withdrawn. The goods yard is now a car park.

The lines to Crewe and Stoke-on-Trent were electrified in 1960 and 1967 respectively. In 1963, due to the growing amount of traffic travelling down Station Road, it was decided that the parts of the road that pass under the bridges should be widened, as they were becoming a bottleneck. The bridge carrying the line to Stoke was upgraded first. The road under it was more than doubled in width and the bridge height was increased by 3 feet (0.9 m) allowing double-decker buses to pass underneath.

Work on the second bridge commenced on 8 June 1965, increasing the height and width in accordance with Ministry of Transport requirements. Around this time, the station itself was upgraded: the platforms were demolished and replaced, and new waiting shelters were erected. A new booking office, facing Station Road and approached by a flight of stairs, was built alongside a new booking lobby, toilets and staff accommodation. New entrances to the platforms were built and the station was installed with electric lighting. Station Road was significantly widened and rerouted slightly in 1967, in a further attempt to accommodate increasing traffic.

As part of the privatisation of British Rail, all stations in Great Britain were sold to Railtrack, and each would be managed by a franchised train operating company. In Cheadle Hulme's case, this was First North Western. In 1996, Railtrack launched a £1 billion programme to restore and renovate every station it operated. Cheadle Hulme had £1.2 million spent on repairs to its platforms, buildings and waiting shelters, and new lighting installed throughout the station. Stephen Day, the MP for Cheadle Hulme, opened the updated station in March 1998.

The junction itself was revamped in 2000 and the signal box was removed, having been superseded by a central signalling point at Stockport station.

In 2002, Railtrack entered administration and ownership of the station transferred to the newly-formed government-owned company Network Rail, but it was still managed by First North Western. In 2004, management of the station transferred to Northern Rail, and in 2011, major work was carried out after years of campaigns, with the construction of pedestrian bridges connecting all four platforms, and lifts enabling disabled access to the platforms. PA equipment was also installed, but not brought into use until later.

In April 2016, management of the station transferred to Arriva Rail North (ARN). At the end of February 2020, ARN's franchise was transferred to an operator of last resort known as Northern Trains, due to ARN's poor performance. Under ARN and Northern Trains, several improvements were made to the station, including refurbishment of the waiting rooms; replacement of the station lighting, customer information screens and ticket machines; and installation of an Amazon Locker. In addition, the PA equipment installed in 2011 was finally brought into use to provide automated announcements across the station.

== Layout ==
The station lies immediately south of a V-shaped junction station on a spur of the West Coast Main Line, where the lines to Crewe and Stoke-on-Trent split. The four platforms are all above street level:

1. accessed from a long flight of stairs from Station Road; serves trains towards Manchester from the direction of Alderley Edge and Crewe
2. accessed through the ticket office; serves trains towards Alderley Edge and Crewe
3. also accessed through the ticket office; serves trains towards Manchester from Stoke-on-Trent
4. accessed either from the car-park to the east of the station, or via another long flight of stairs; serves trains towards Stoke-on-Trent.

Each platform is provided with waiting shelters, passenger information screens, and lifts and stairs to footbridges enabling access between platforms, which were constructed in 2011. There is also a lift to the car park, enabling disabled access to the station.

== Services ==
Northern Trains operates all passenger services calling here; the general off-peak service pattern in trains per hour/day is:

- 3 tph to Manchester Piccadilly, via Stockport
- 1 tph to Stoke-on-Trent, calling at all stations except Longport
- 1 tph to Alderley Edge, calling at Handforth and Wilmslow
- 1 tph to Crewe, calling at all stations.

On Sundays, there is:

- 1 tph between Crewe and Manchester Piccadilly
- 6 tpd between Stoke-on-Trent and Manchester Piccadilly.

Preceding station	National Rail	Following station
Handforth	Northern Trains Crewe – Manchester Piccadilly	Stockport
Bramhall	Northern Trains Stoke–on-Trent – Manchester Piccadilly	Stockport
