= Manchester Piccadilly station =

Principal railway station in Manchester, England

Manchester Piccadilly
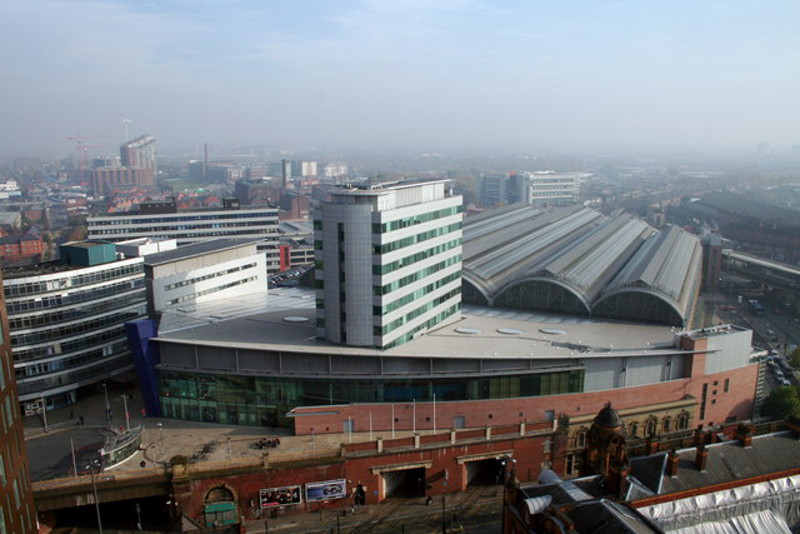
- Aerial view of Piccadilly station

General information
- Location: Manchester, Greater Manchester, England
- Coordinates: 53.477°N 2.230°W
- Grid reference: SJ847978
- Manager: Network Rail
- Transit authority: Greater Manchester
- Platforms: 14 (National Rail), 2 (Manchester Metrolink)

Other information
- Station code: MAN
- Fare zone: City (D)
- Classification: DfT category A

Key dates
- 1842: Opened as Store Street
- 1847: Renamed Manchester London Road
- 1861: Rebuilt
- 1881: Expanded
- 1960: Renovated and renamed Manchester Piccadilly
- 2002: Renovated

Passengers
- 2021/22: ▲19.581 million
- Interchange: 1.236 million
- 2022/23: ▲23.558 million
- Interchange: ▲2.046 million
- 2023/24: ▲25.776 million
- Interchange: ▲2.148 million
- 2024/25: ▲27.402 million
- Interchange: ▼2.144 million
- 2025/26: ▼26.645 million
- Interchange: ▲2.293 million

Listed Building – Grade II
- Feature: Train shed at Piccadilly station
- Designated: 6 June 1994
- Reference no.: 1283014
Location
Notes
- Passenger statistics from the Office of Rail and Road

Manchester Piccadilly is the main railway station of the city of Manchester, in the metropolitan county of Greater Manchester, England. Opened originally as Store Street in 1842, it was renamed Manchester London Road in 1847 and became Manchester Piccadilly in 1960.

The station is located to the south-east of the city centre, it hosts long-distance inter-city and cross-country services to national destinations including London, Birmingham, Nottingham, Glasgow, Edinburgh, Cardiff, Bristol, Exeter, Plymouth, Reading, Southampton and Bournemouth; regional services to destinations in Northern England, including Cleethorpes, Liverpool, Leeds, Redcar Central, Sheffield and York; and local commuter services around Greater Manchester. It is one of 20 major stations managed by Network Rail. The station has 14 platforms: 12 terminal and two through platforms (numbers 13 and 14). Piccadilly is also a major interchange with the Metrolink light rail system with two tram platforms in its undercroft.

Manchester Piccadilly is the busiest station in the Manchester station group (the other major stations in Manchester are Manchester Oxford Road and Manchester Victoria). As of December 2024, it is the second-busiest station in the United Kingdom outside of London (after Birmingham New Street), and is also one of the busiest interchange stations outside London, with over 2 million passengers changing trains annually. The station hosts services from six train operating companies.

Between the late 1990s and early 2000s, Piccadilly station was refurbished, taking five years and costing £100 million (in 2002); it was the most expensive improvement on the UK rail network at the time. Further improvements and expansion plans have been proposed. In December 2014, a Transport and Works Act application was submitted for the construction of two through platforms as part of the Manchester Piccadilly and Manchester Oxford Road Capacity Scheme. In September 2019, Network Rail declared the Castlefield corridor through Manchester 'congested'. Despite this, in 2023, these plans were withdrawn in favour of "a new approach", comprising upgrades to other stations in Manchester.

== History ==
=== Origins ===
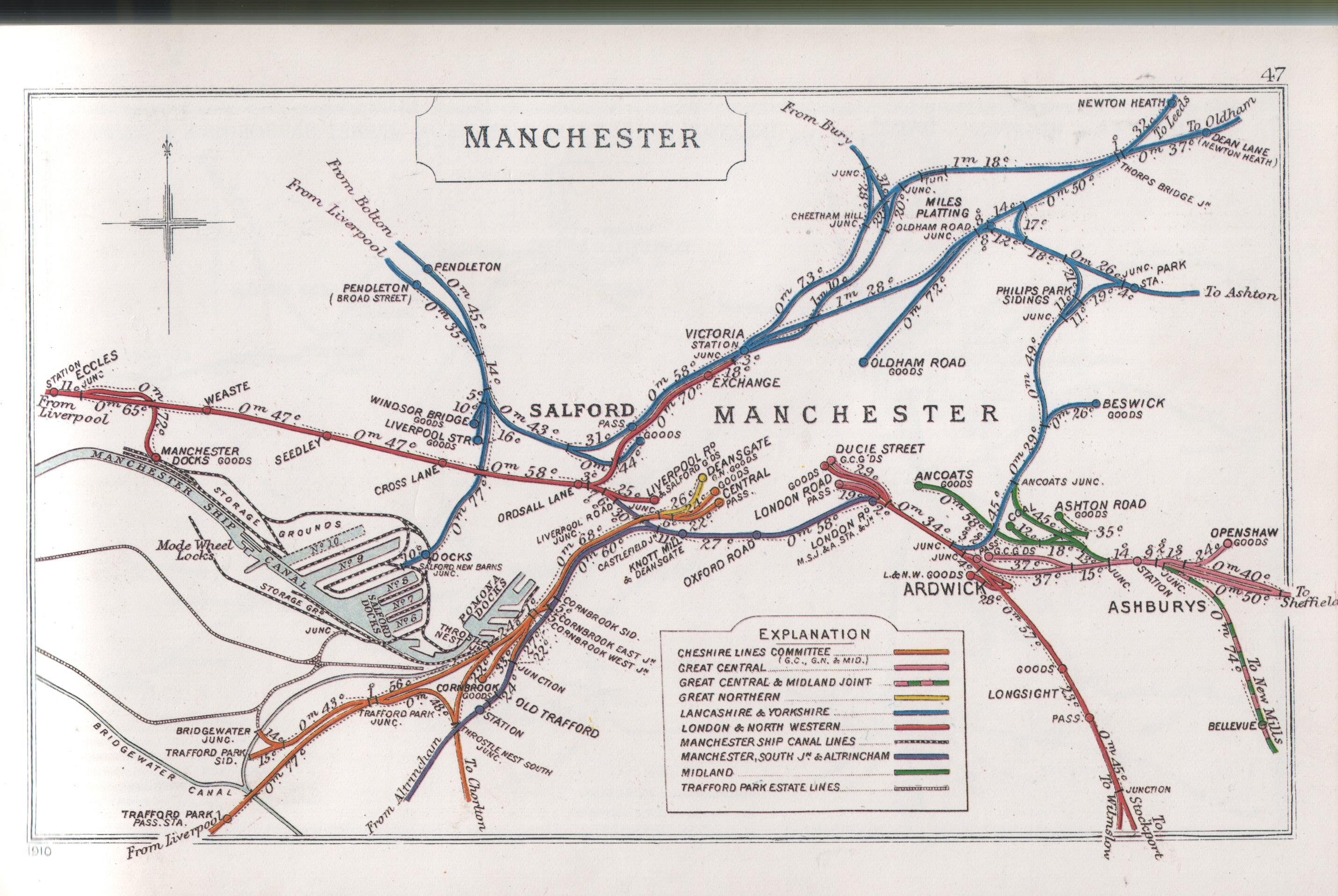
A 1910 Railway Clearing House junction diagram showing railways in Manchester

In June 1840, the Manchester and Birmingham Railway (M&BR) opened a temporary terminus on its line to Stockport on Travis Street. A large site, 1,700 ft (518 m) long by 500 ft (152 m) wide, was cleared of terraced houses and industrial premises to make way for the permanent station Store Street which was built on top of a viaduct, 30 ft (9 m) above ground level. The station was opened adjacent to London Road on 8 May 1842. It had two platforms, offices and passenger amenities and by then the line had been extended to Crewe.

Store Street was designed by M&BR's chief engineer, George W. Buck, who designed many of the line's structures including the Stockport Viaduct. Charles Hutton Gregory was the assistant engineer. The station was shared from the beginning with the Sheffield, Ashton-under-Lyne and Manchester Railway (SA&MR) following an agreement made by the promoters in 1837.

The M&BR amalgamated with other railway companies to create the London and North Western Railway (LNWR) in 1846. The SA&MR changed its name to the Manchester, Sheffield and Lincolnshire Railway (MS&LR) three years later.

=== Manchester London Road ===
In 1847, the station was renamed London Road. In 1849 the Manchester, South Junction and Altrincham Railway (MSJA&R) began using the station after its line from Manchester Oxford Road was extended. Its single platform which opened on 1 August 1849 to the south of, and adjacent to the main part of station, was the predecessor of through platforms 13 and 14. The MSJA&R's line connected to the main line south of the station and formed a through route to the LNWR's line to Liverpool.

Manchester London Road Station Enlargement Act 1861
- Act of Parliament
- Parliament of the United Kingdom
- Long title: An Act for the Enlargement and Regulation of the Manchester London Road Station, and for other Purposes.
- Citation: 24 & 25 Vict. c. lxvi

Dates
- Royal assent: 12 June 1861

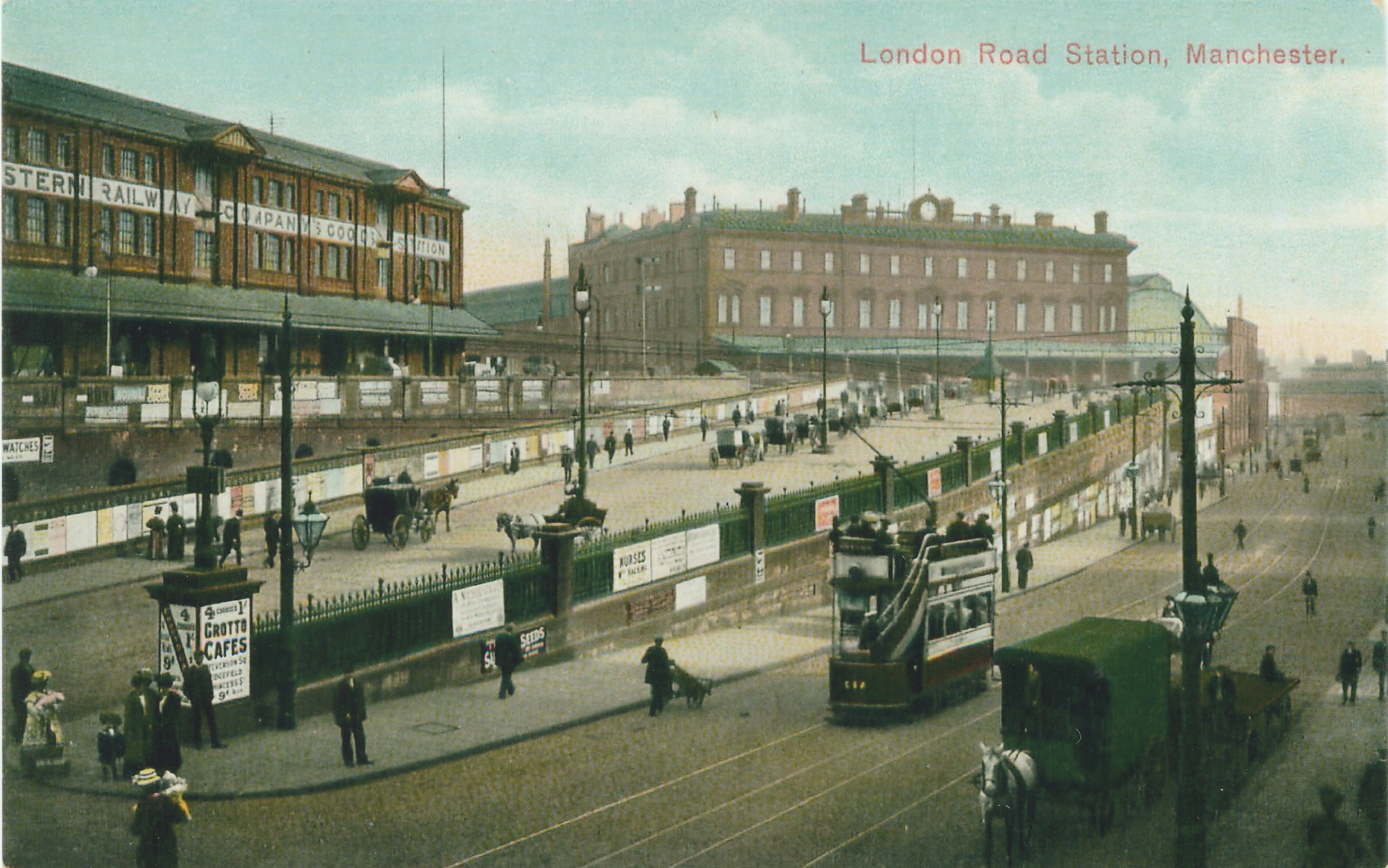
Colourised postcard of the frontage of London Road station c. 1905

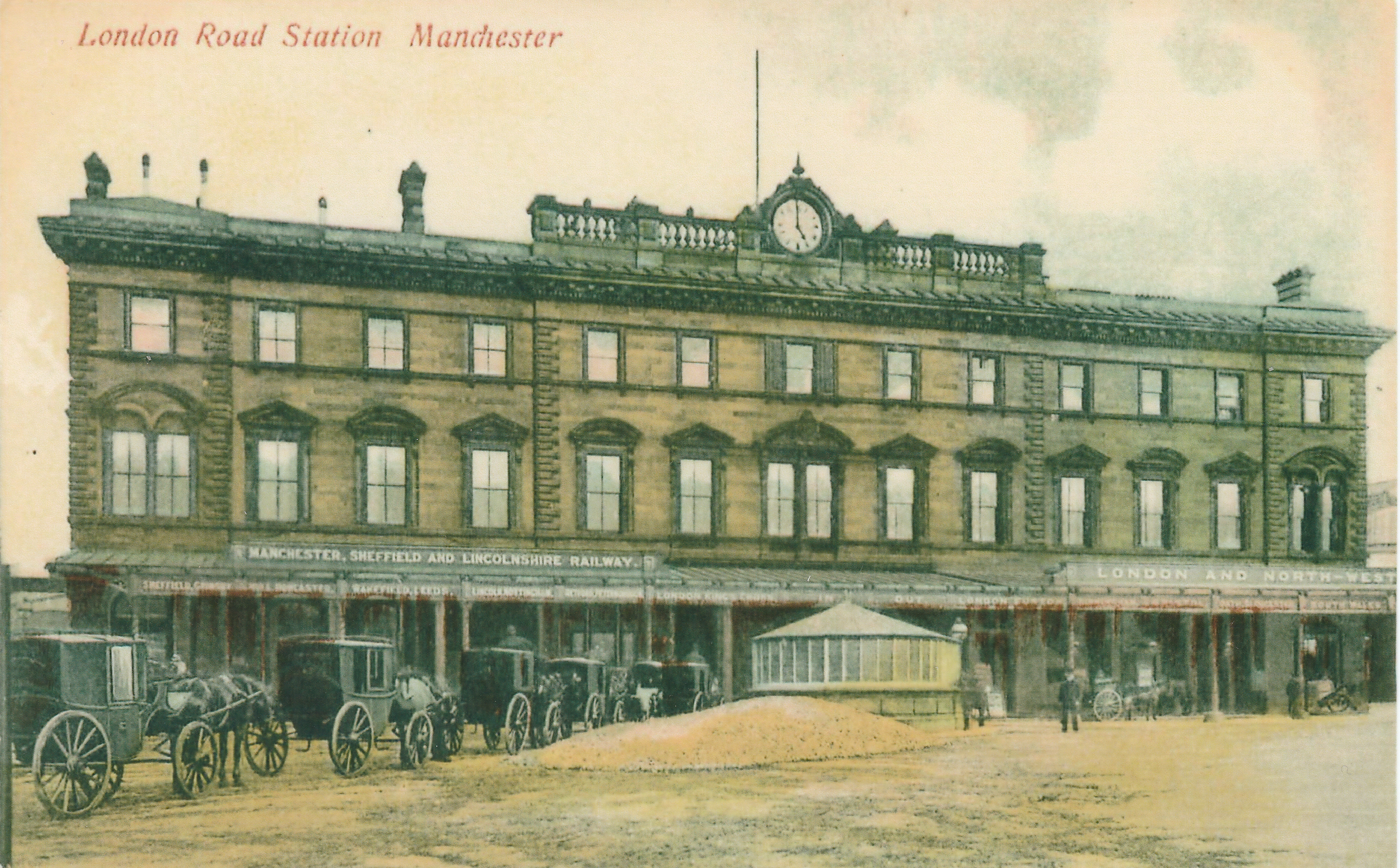
The 1860s station building, which lasted until the 1960s

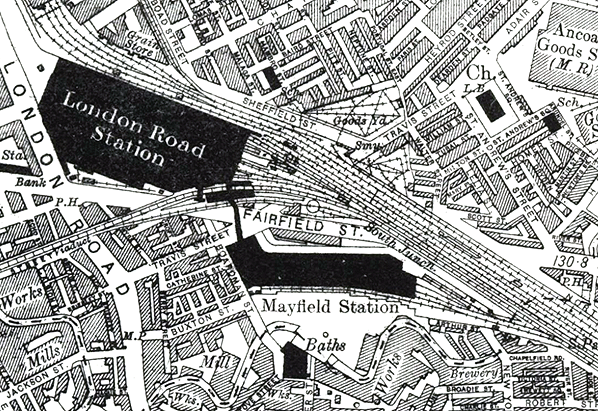
1915 map showing London Road and Mayfield stations

By the 1850s, London Road was overcrowded and the relationship between the LNWR and MS&LR had deteriorated, due to the latter's decision to cooperate with the Great Northern Railway in providing a rival service to London from the station, in direct competition with the LNWR. Netherless, the two cooperated on rebuilding the station to expand it, which was authorised by the Manchester London Road Station Enlargement Act 1861 (24 & 25 Vict. c. lxvi). The rebuild which started in 1862, allowed the station to be divided; the MS&LR occupying the north-eastern side and the LNWR the south-western side. The station was given a new entrance building and concourse with each company having separate booking offices and passenger facilities. A 656 ft (200 m) long iron and glass trainshed was built over the terminal platforms; it had two 95 ft (29 m) wide arched spans, one covering the LNWR platforms and the other the MS&LR platforms. On 20 January 1866, a fatal accident occurred during the roof's construction, when part of it collapsed killing two workmen and injuring 30 others. The enquiry determined that the collapse was caused by strong winds and heavy snowfall. At the same time, the viaduct south of the station to Ardwick was widened to carry four tracks, and both companies built goods stations and warehouses to the northern side of the passenger station.

Within ten years, the station was again over-crowded as traffic continued to increase and expansion was again required. Between 1880 and 1883, the LNWR widened its side of the station and built more platforms, which were covered by two more 69 ft (21 m) wide arched spans to the trainshed. At the same time, the MSJ&AR platform was taken out and rebuilt as an island platform on a girder bridge over Fairfield Street and linked to the main station by a footbridge. In May 1882, the improvements were opened.

In 1897, the MS&LR changed its name to the Great Central Railway (GCR); it opened its own direct route from the station to London in 1899.

In 1910, the adjacent Mayfield station opened with four platforms to alleviate overcrowding at London Road. The stations were linked by a footbridge. Mayfield station closed to passengers in 1960 and to all traffic in 1986. The derelict station has remained in situ despite proposed redevelopment schemes including reopening it to relieve demand. In October 2013 the station's roof/canopies were demolished due to safety concerns.

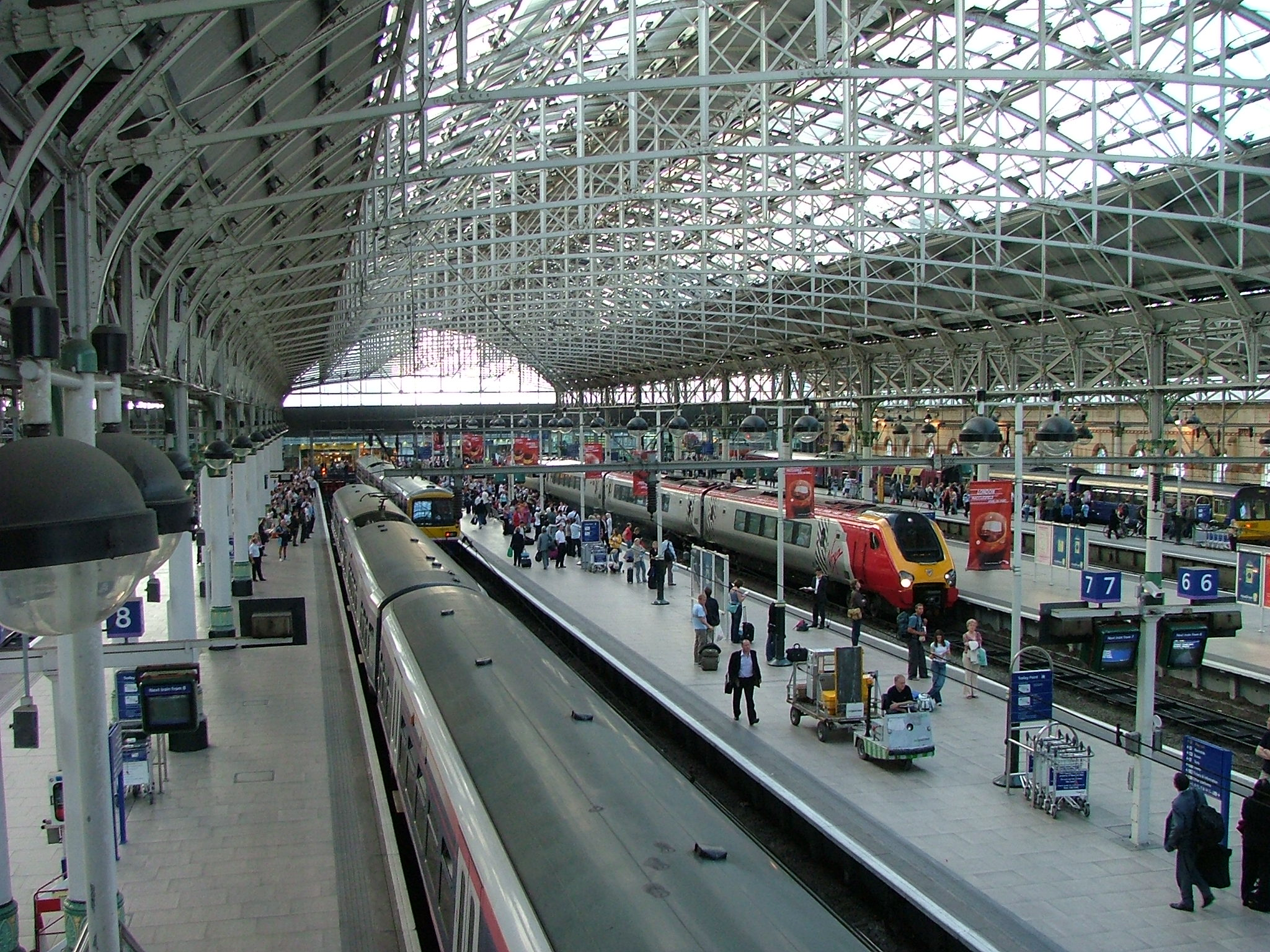
Interior of the Victorian train shed

Following the 1923 railway grouping, the LNWR amalgamated with several other railway companies to create the London, Midland and Scottish Railway (LMS), and the GCR amalgamated with other railways to create the London and North Eastern Railway (LNER). The division of the station was maintained and it continued to be operated as two separate stations even after the nationalisation of the railways in 1948: One side was used by the London Midland Region of British Railways and the other by Eastern Region.

=== Manchester Piccadilly ===
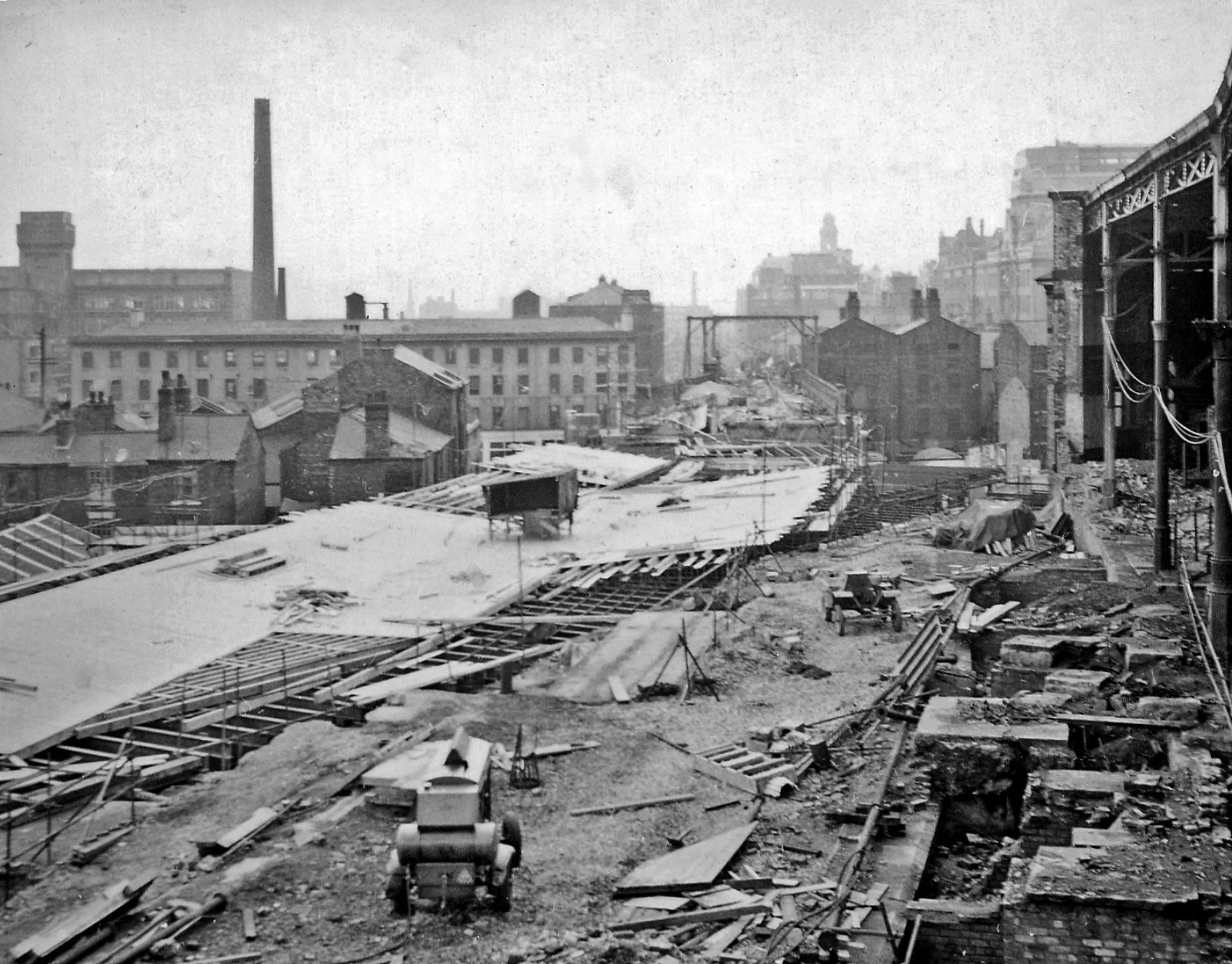
Construction of platforms 13 and 14 in 1959

Between 1958 and 1966, London Road was rebuilt in the West Coast Main Line modernisation programme undertaken by British Railways. It was renamed Manchester Piccadilly on 12 September 1960. Piccadilly is the name of a road and Piccadilly Gardens is nearby.

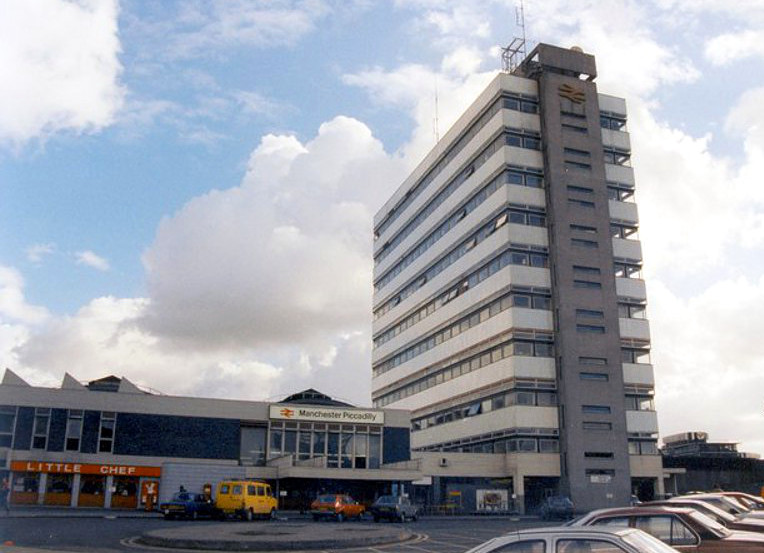
Piccadilly station in 1989, with the concourse building opened in 1966; this was later redeveloped in 2002

The London Midland Region rebuilt the station at a cost of £1.75 million (equivalent to £35.63 million at 2025 prices) in preparation for electric train services to London. Most of the station was rebuilt, except for the Victorian trainsheds which remained mostly unaltered, although the two 1880s spans were shortened towards the concourse end. The station was reconstructed in two phases, 1958–1960 and 1963–1966; the break was the result of a national credit squeeze restricting funding for railway modernisation.

The former MSJA&R through platforms and bridges over Fairfield Street were rebuilt on a prestressed concrete slab bridge with cantilevered sides for the tracks. The layout in the trainshed was reconfigured to add several platforms. A new concourse and entrance were built, alongside which was a ten-storey office block which housed British Rail staff. On 11 May 1966, work was completed for the introduction of electric expresses to London.

The approach to the station was also redeveloped. The LNWR goods warehouse alongside the station approach closed in 1965 and a curved office block, Gateway House, was opened in its place in 1969.

Piccadilly remained open throughout the reconstruction, but there was disruption, and many trains were diverted to Manchester Mayfield or Manchester Central stations. When the work was completed, those stations were no longer required; they were closed and their services were diverted into Piccadilly.

==== Picc-Vic tunnel and Metrolink ====
In the early 1970s, an underground station, Piccadilly Low Level, was proposed as part of the Picc-Vic tunnel project. This scheme proposed creating a direct rail link between Piccadilly and Manchester Victoria, by building a tunnel and several underground stations under Manchester city centre. The project was cancelled in the late 1970s, because of the high cost, and transport planners turned instead towards light rail as a lower-cost option. This resulted eventually in the Manchester Metrolink system which opened in the early 1990s linking the two stations by a street-level tramway and linking two converted rail lines to Altrincham and Bury. The tram stop in the station's undercroft opened in 1992.

==== Windsor Link ====
Between 1988 and 1989, Piccadilly's through platforms 13 and 14 were lengthened further, in conjunction with the opening of the Windsor Link chord in Salford, which allowed trains from places to the north of Manchester, such as Bolton, Preston, Blackpool and Scotland, to run directly into Piccadilly via the through platforms and continue south to destinations such as Stockport, Buxton and (from 1993 onwards) Manchester Airport. Once completed, it allowed for many services from the north to be diverted from Manchester Victoria, which was reduced in size; this enhanced Piccadilly's status as Manchester's main station. The link was opened in 1988 and was declared to be fully operational the following year.

==== 2002 redevelopment ====
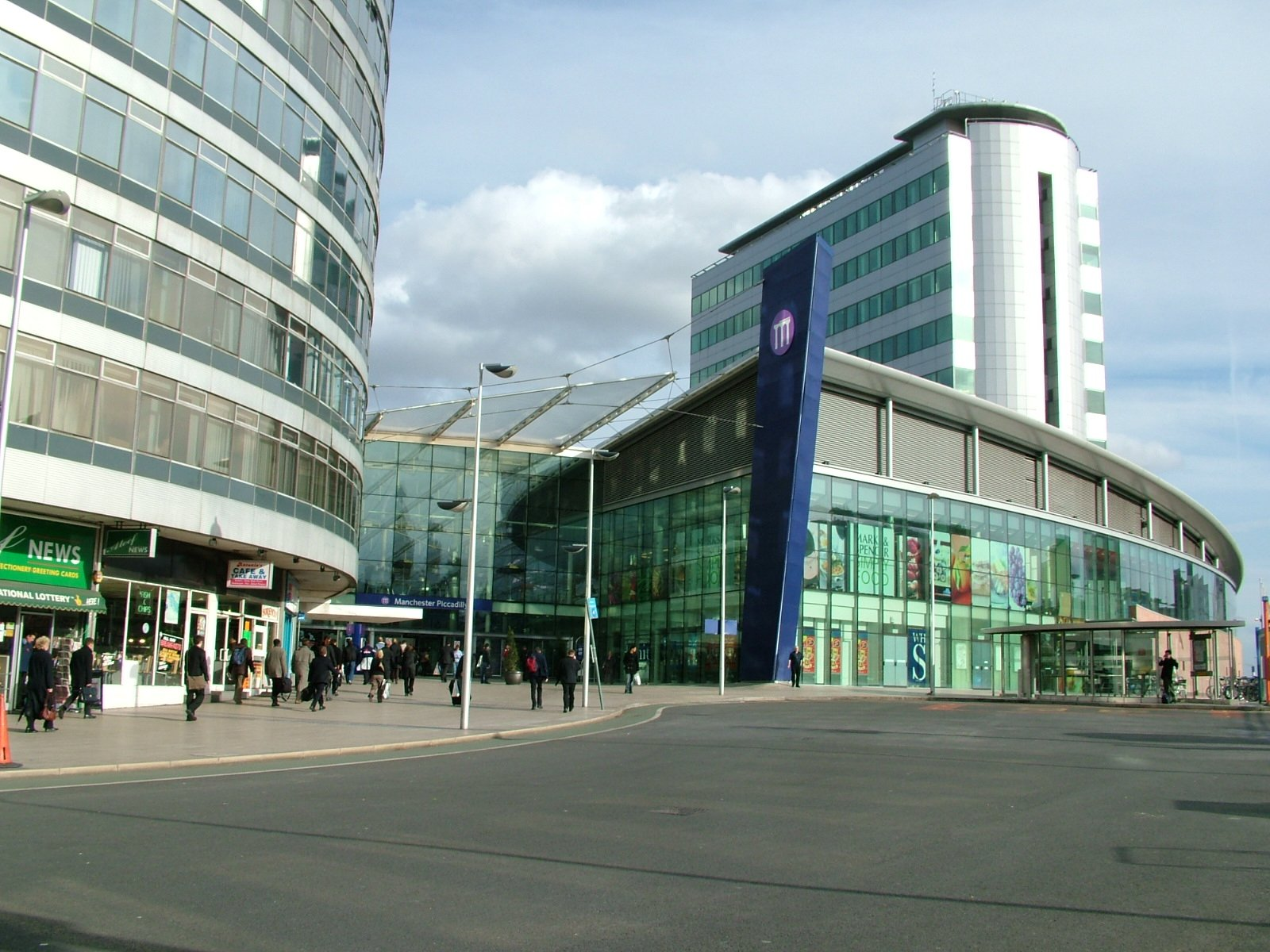
The post-2002 main entrance to the station

Between 1998 and 2002, in preparation for the 2002 Commonwealth Games, the station underwent a £100 million redevelopment. The glass roof of the trainshed, which is a Grade II listed structure, was reglazed and repainted. A new main entrance and enlarged concourse with a mezzanine level, designed by BDP, replaced the 1960s structure, which had become insufficient for the number of passengers regularly using the station. A moving walkway was installed to take passengers from the concourse to platforms 13 and 14 on the far south side of the station, which had previously necessitated a long walk. Another entrance was also created on Fairfield Street, which provides access to a new taxi rank along with a drop-off point for private cars.

=== Electrification ===
The station is unusual in having seen two different systems of overhead railway electrification:

- 1,500 V DC overhead: The first electrified line into London Road was the MSJA&R line to Altrincham, a busy commuter route; it was energised in 1931. London Road was the terminus of the electrification scheme which ran through to the through platforms. The second line to be electrified using 1,500 V DC was the LNER's Woodhead Route from Manchester to Sheffield Victoria. Work on the scheme commenced in the late 1930s, but was stopped due to the Second World War, before being restarted in the early 1950s. Electrification was completed in September 1954. The two electric 1,500 V DC lines ran into different parts of the station.
- 25 kV AC overhead: This was adopted as the national standard by British Railways and was brought to London Road/Piccadilly in the West Coast Main Line electrification scheme starting in the late-1950s. The main line was electrified to Crewe by 1960 and London by 1966. At the same time, the 1,500 V electrification on the Altrincham line was cut back to Oxford Road to where the new system was extended from the south. The Altrincham line was converted to 25 kV in 1971.

The two systems co-existed for a number of years. The Woodhead Route was closed as a through line in 1981, but local services to Glossop and Hadfield continued to be operated by 1,500 V trains until the line was converted to 25 kV during 1984.

During the 2010s, the Northern Hub scheme saw electrification extended from Manchester to Liverpool in 2015, and Manchester to Preston and through to Blackpool in 2019.

== Architecture ==
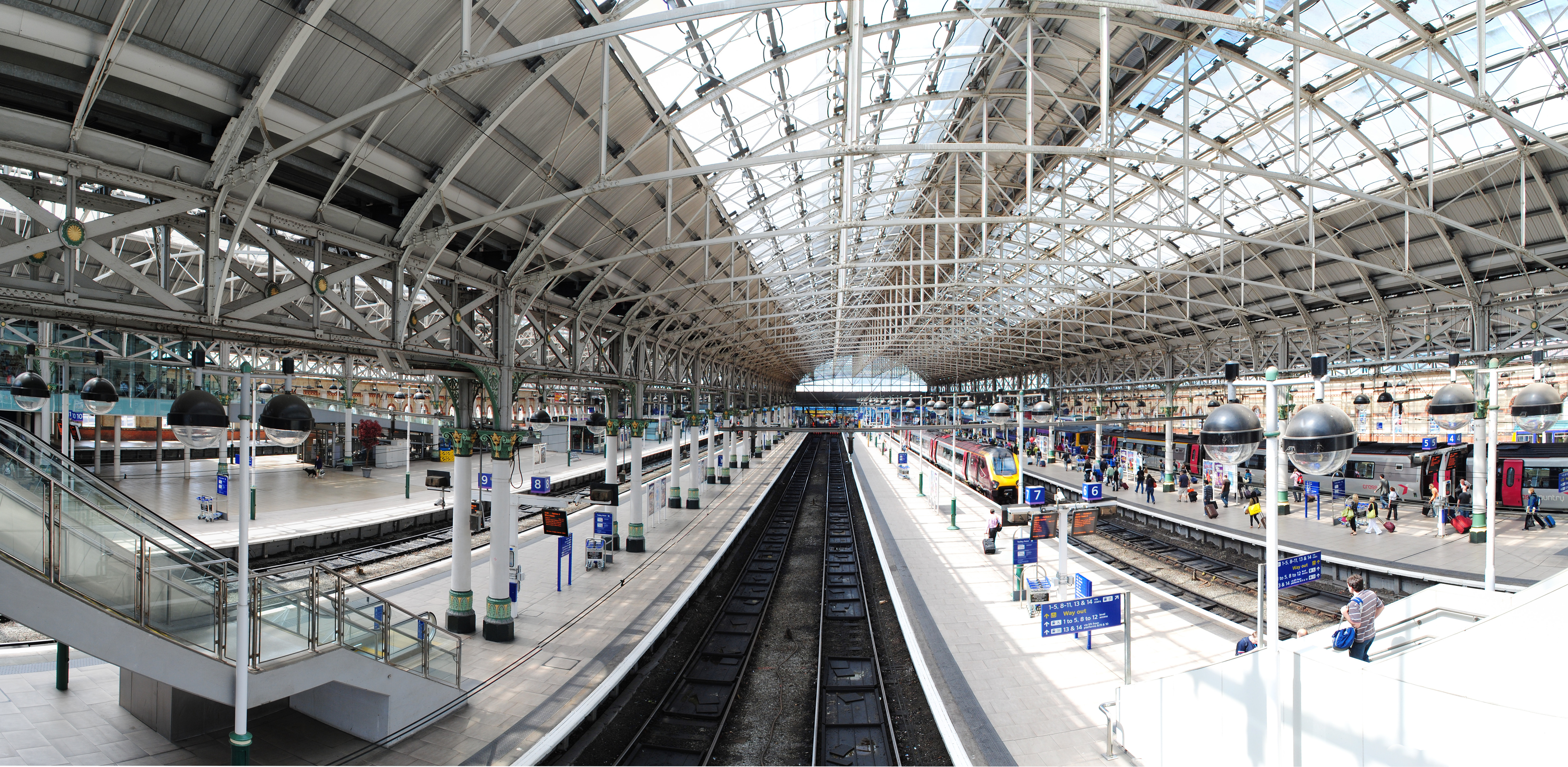
One of the train shed's four arched roofs from the 1860s and 1880s

The listed train shed roof which is 105 metres (344 ft) wide between platforms 1 and 12, comprises four spans: two of the spans, 185 metres (607 ft) in length, were built over the eastern part of the station during the 1860s while the other two, at the western side measuring 150 metres (490 ft), were constructed in the early 1880s. The roof is supported by masonry walls at the outer edges, which have round-headed windows alongside platforms 1 and 12, and rows of cast iron columns along the platforms in its interior space. The roof spans have an arrangement of wrought iron trusses with supporting cast iron struts on girders, which are evenly spaced between the columns.

As built, the roof was largely covered with slates with some areas of glazing; over time, the slates were replaced with boarded felt. Between 1997 and 1999, the station roof was refurbished and the traditional cladding was replaced with around 10,000 panes of toughened glass that 'float' above the wrought iron trusses. Layers of nets have been installed, to catch falling glass in the event of any of the panes were to break.

Below the train shed is the undercroft that was used as a goods station. Cast iron columns and brick arches support the terminal platforms directly above. Since the early 1990s, the undercroft accommodates the Metrolink station, its tracks, sidings, and car parking. Before it was reused for the Metrolink, the cast-iron columns throughout the undercroft were encased in concrete as a protective measure against collision.

George W. Buck designed the original skew arch bridge over Fairfield Street; it had ten cast iron arch ribs, which formed one part of the brick arch viaduct, and was topped with open stonework parapets. The bridge was subsequently widened and wrought iron plate girders and transverse girders were added to support longitudinal joists with iron arch plates. In the 1960s, in the reconstruction programme, the cast iron arches and spandrels were encased in concrete. Platforms 13 and 14 are situated on top of this bridge.

Many of the original station buildings were demolished during the 1960s to clear the way for a new approach. The main entrance leads to a concourse with ground floor, and since the 2000s, mezzanine levels. The Fairfield Street entrance leads to the Metrolink station in the undercroft and is linked to the rail platforms by escalators. Between 1997 and 2002, a redevelopment programme revised the station's layout and a glass partition wall with ticket barriers separating the concourse from the platforms was constructed. The station's approach leading to the end of Piccadilly was constructed in 1969 along with the "wavy" fronted Gateway House designed by the architect Richard Seifert. Gateway House was modernised during 2003.

== Facilities ==
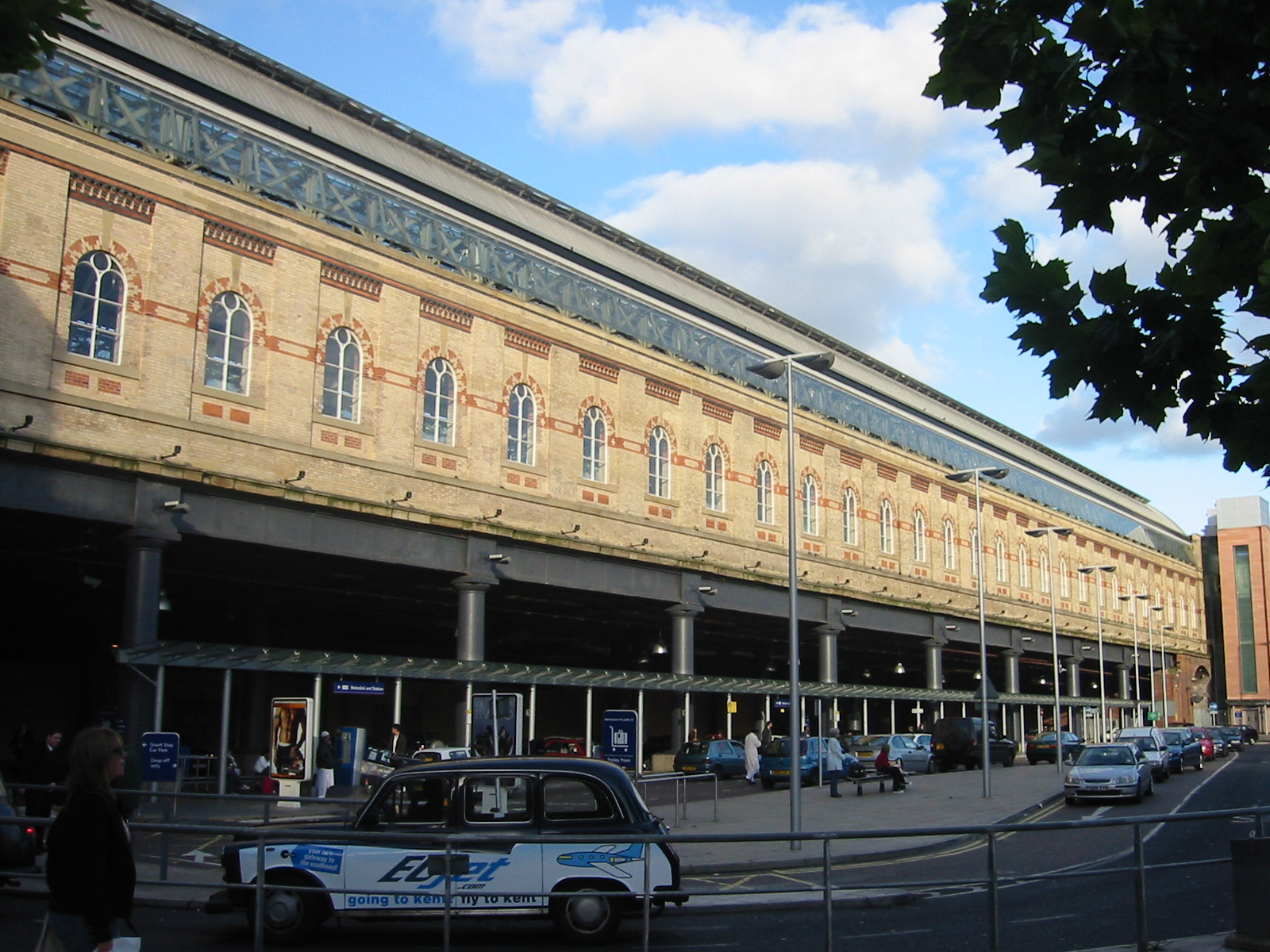
Fairfield Street entrance, the platforms inside are level with the brown brickwork

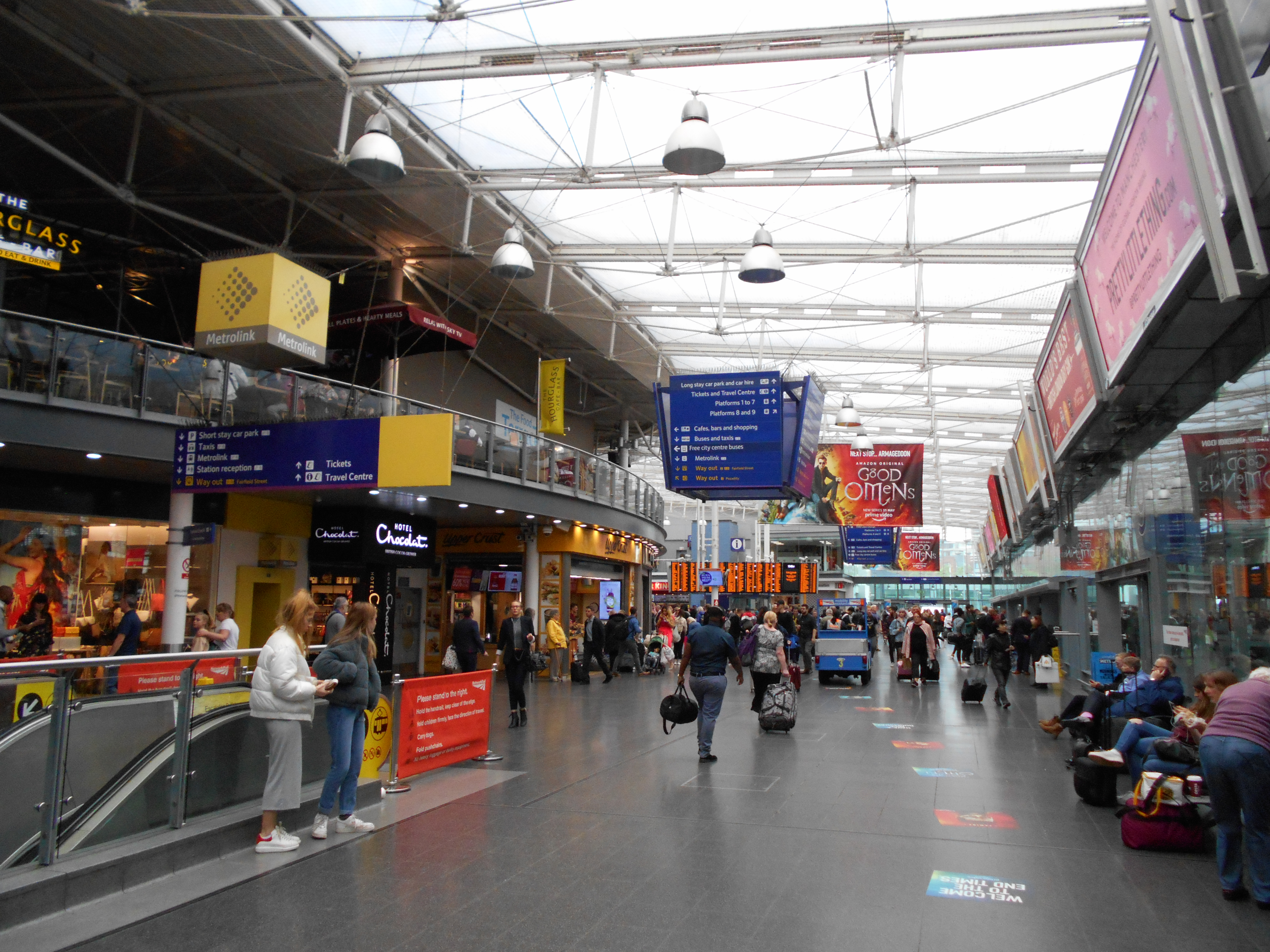
Retail and refreshment outlets on the station concourse

The Fairfield Street entrance, at basement level, serves the car park, the taxi rank and the Metrolink station. Above it at track level is a concourse into which the main entrance feeds, housing ticket offices, information points, seating, timetables, toilets, shops, and food and drink outlets. Above the concourse is a second level of food outlets and bars, and the Avanti West Coast First Class Lounge. On the main concourse, doorways in a large glass partition wall access platforms 1 to 12. A travelator leads to the upper concourse linked by a footbridge, steps and lift to platforms 13 and 14. The island lounge contains retail outlets, toilets and a departure lounge. There are vending machines, waiting areas and snack bars on platforms 13 and 14.

Manchester Piccadilly is accessible for disabled people; it has escalators and lifts to all levels, wide-access doors and gates, braille signs, hearing loops and disabled toilet facilities.

Cycle racks are available on Fairfield Street and the long-stay car park and next to the tower block at the station front. During March 2010, Manchester City Council and Network Rail unveiled plans for a Cycle Centre to provide secure facilities and on-site maintenance and hire services. The station has a taxi rank, drop-off/pick-up point, and short- and long-stay car parks. accessible from Fairfield Street. The long-stay multi-storey car park is at the rear of the station.

Ticket barriers were installed in Autumn 2016 between platforms 3 and 7, following an application by Virgin Trains. Ticket barriers were fitted on platforms 1–3 by TransPennine Express.

== Layout ==
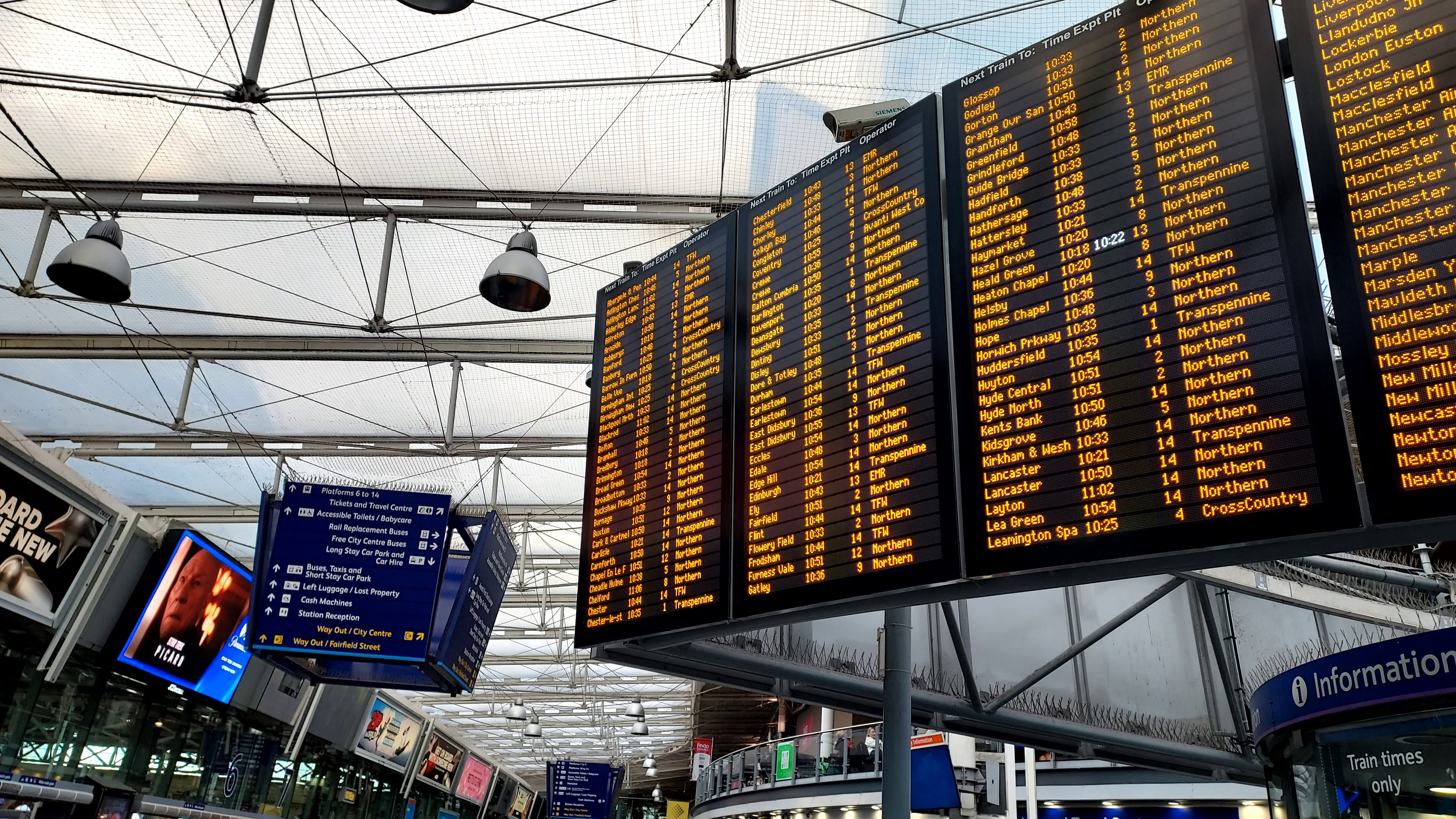
Screen showing train departures

Platform 1 is on the north side of the station and the through platforms 13 and 14 are on the south side. Of the terminus platforms:

- Platforms 1-4 are typically used by eastbound services to Rose Hill Marple, New Mills Central and Sheffield via the Hope Valley Line; services on the Glossop Line; and TransPennine Express services to Huddersfield. Northern services to Crewe are also frequently seen from these platforms.
- Platforms 5-9 are the longest and are used mainly by Avanti West Coast and CrossCountry services. Platform 5 usually sees the local Northern services to Chester and Stoke-on-Trent. Platform 9 sees the use of the TransPennine Express services from Cleethorpes - Manchester Airport.
- Platforms 10-12 are considerably shorter than the others and are usually used to accommodate local trains to Crewe and Manchester Airport, plus Mid-Cheshire line, Buxton Line and South Wales services; platform 12 is the shortest and can only accommodate four coaches.
- Platforms 13-14 are through platforms and are used by through services via Manchester Oxford Road to North Wales, Liverpool Lime Street, North West England, Yorkshire, North East England, Glasgow Central and Edinburgh Waverley, and through services from Manchester Airport.

The main entrance and concourse are to the front of the terminal platforms and the taxi and car drop-off entrance is on the southern side on Fairfield Street. The Metrolink tram line passes under the station through the undercroft. Its platforms are under the concourse and railway platforms. To the south of Piccadilly, on the opposite side of Fairfield Street, is the derelict Manchester Mayfield station, which was closed for railway use in 1986.

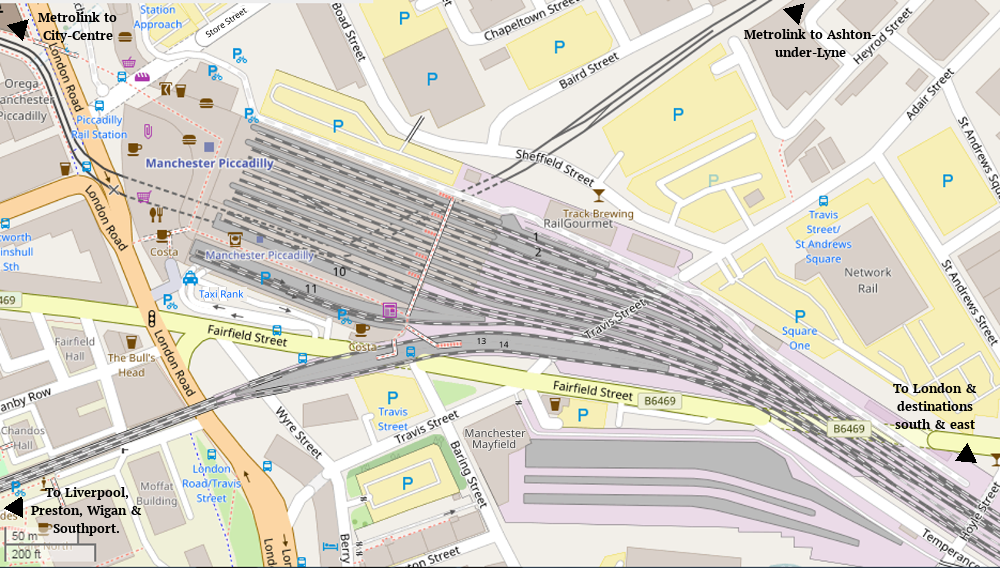
Layout plan of Piccadilly station, and surrounding streets.

== Services ==
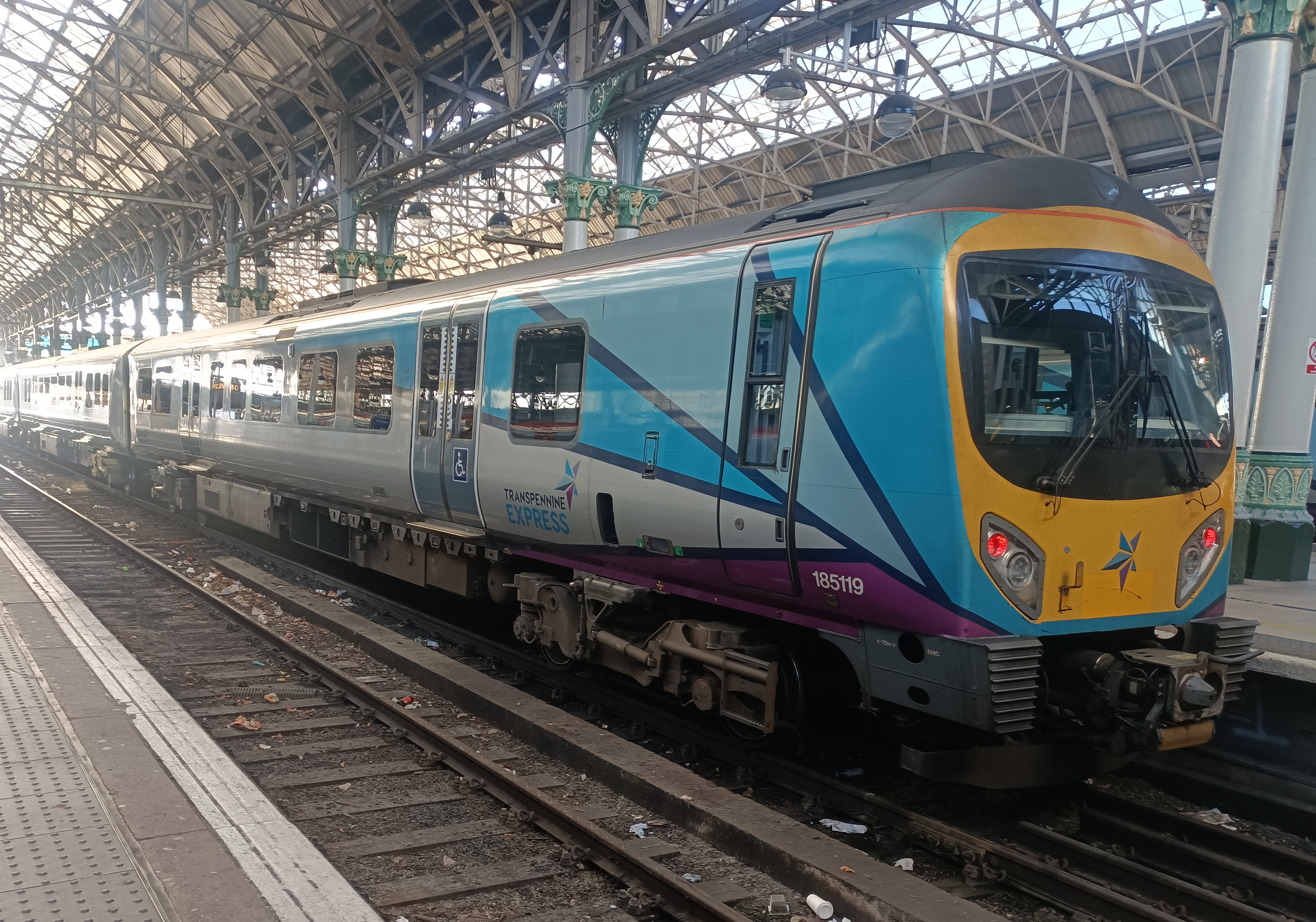
A TransPennine Express Class 185 at Piccadilly

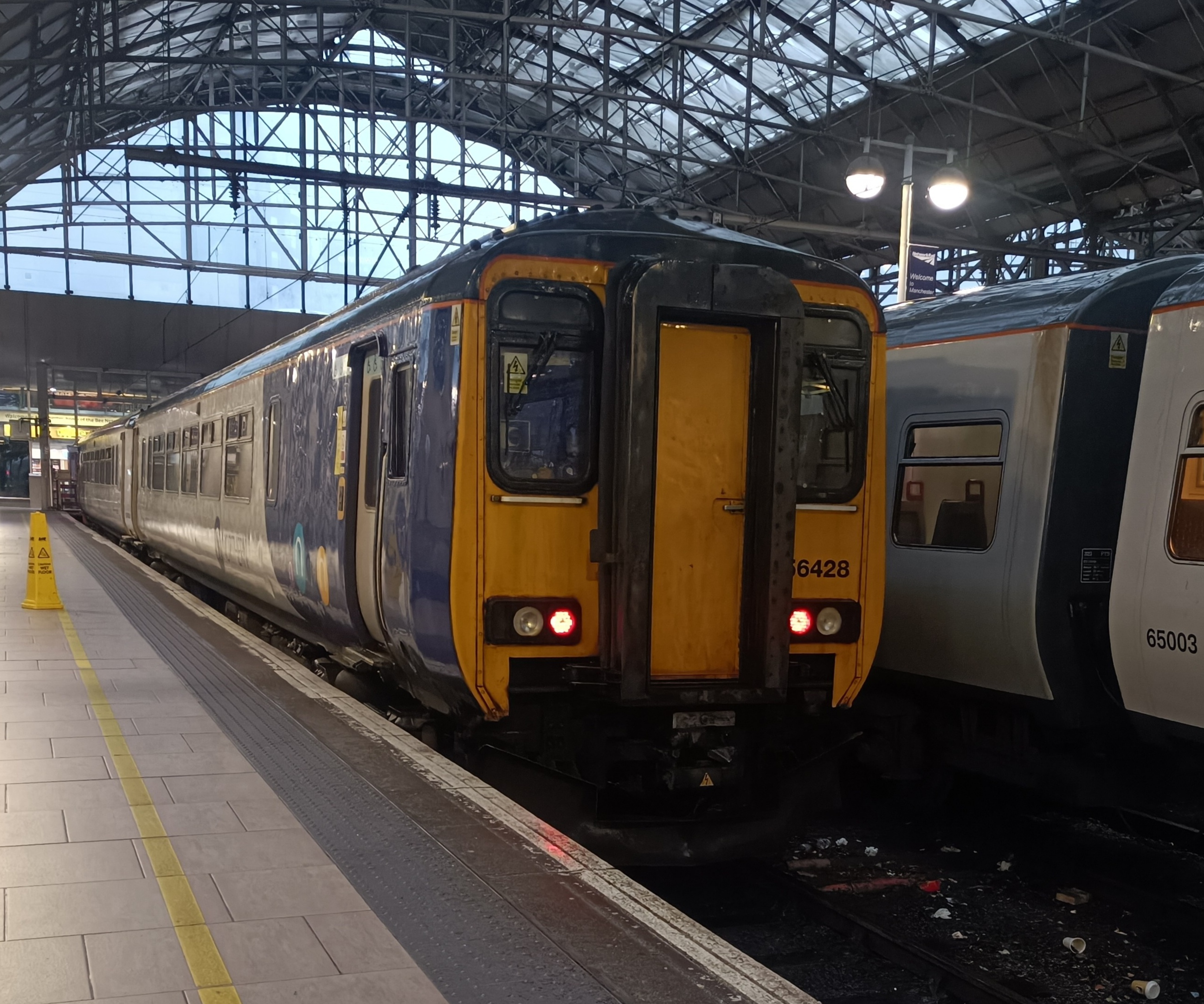
A Northern Trains Class 156 at Piccadilly

The station has 12 terminus platforms, for services terminating from locations to the south of Manchester, and two through platforms 13 and 14. The platforms are split into A and B sections to allow more than one train to stand. The through platforms 13 and 14 are used by through services via Manchester Oxford Road to North Wales, Liverpool, North West England, Yorkshire, North East England, Glasgow, Edinburgh and through services from Manchester Airport.

Manchester Piccadilly is currently served by six train operating companies:

=== Avanti West Coast ===
- 3tph to London Euston; of which:
  - 1tph calling at Stockport, Stoke-on-Trent and Nuneaton
  - 1tph calling at Stockport, Macclesfield, Stoke-on-Trent, Rugby and Milton Keynes Central
  - 1tph calling at Stockport, Wilmslow, Crewe and Stafford.

=== CrossCountry ===
- 1tph to Bournemouth, calling at Stockport, Macclesfield, Stoke-on-Trent, Stafford, Wolverhampton, Birmingham New Street, Birmingham International, Coventry, Leamington Spa, Banbury, Oxford, Reading, Basingstoke, Winchester, Southampton Airport Parkway, Southampton Central and Brockenhurst.
- 1tph to Bristol Temple Meads, calling at Stockport, Macclesfield, Stoke-on-Trent, Wolverhampton, Birmingham New Street, Cheltenham Spa and Bristol Parkway.

=== East Midlands Railway ===
- 1tph to Liverpool Lime Street, calling at Manchester Oxford Road, Warrington Central, Widnes and Liverpool South Parkway.
- 1tph to Norwich, calling at Stockport, Sheffield, Dronfield (irregular), Chesterfield, Nottingham, Grantham, Peterborough, Ely and Thetford.

=== Northern Trains ===
- 1tph to Lancaster, calling at Manchester Oxford Road, Deansgate, Bolton, Chorley and Preston; of which:
  - 11tpd continue to Barrow-in-Furness, calling at Carnforth, Silverdale, Arnside, Grange-over-Sands, Kents Bank (irregular), Cark & Cartmel, Ulverston, Dalton and Roose
  - 4tpd continue to Windermere, calling at Oxenholme Lake District, Kendal, Burneside and Staveley.
- 2tph to Blackpool North, calling at Manchester Oxford Road, Deansgate, Salford Crescent, Bolton, Lostock, Horwich Parkway, Blackrod (1tph), Adlington (1tph), Chorley, Buckshaw Parkway, Leyland, Preston, Kirkham & Wesham, Poulton-le-Fylde and Layton (1tph). On Sundays, this is reduced to 1tph calling at all stations.
- 1tph to Liverpool Lime Street via Newton-le-Willows, calling at Manchester Oxford Road, Deansgate, Eccles, Patricroft, Newton-le-Willows, Earlestown, St Helens Junction, Lea Green, Rainhill, Whiston, Huyton, Roby, Broad Green, Wavertree Technology Park and Edge Hill.
- 5tph to Manchester Airport, each with different calling patterns; of which:
  - 2tph calling at Mauldeth Road, Burnage, East Didsbury, Gatley and Heald Green; 1tph continues to Crewe (see below) (1tph on Sundays)
  - 1tph calling at Heald Green
  - 1tph calling at Gatley. On Sundays, this service calls at East Didsbury and Heald Green instead of Gatley
  - 1tph non-stop, Monday to Saturday only.
- 1tph to Crewe via Manchester Airport, calling at Mauldeth Road, Burnage, East Didsbury, Gatley, Heald Green, Manchester Airport, Styal, Wilmslow, Alderley Edge, Holmes Chapel and Sandbach. On Sundays, this train terminates at Wilmslow.
- 1tph to Crewe via Stockport, calling at Levenshulme, Heaton Chapel, Stockport, Cheadle Hulme, Handforth, Wilmslow, Alderley Edge, Chelford, Goostrey, Holmes Chapel and Sandbach.
- 1tph to Alderley Edge, calling at Levenshulme, Heaton Chapel, Stockport, Cheadle Hulme, Handforth and Wilmslow (Monday to Saturday only).
- 1tph to Stoke-on-Trent, calling at Stockport, Cheadle Hulme, Bramhall, Poynton, Adlington, Prestbury, Macclesfield, Congleton and Kidsgrove. Some additional morning peak hour services start at Macclesfield. The Sunday service is 6tpd.
- 1tph to Chester via Northwich, calling at Stockport, Navigation Road, Altrincham, Hale, Ashley, Mobberley, Knutsford, Plumley, Lostock Gralam, Northwich, Greenbank, Cuddington, Delamere and Mouldsworth. The Sunday service is 1tp2h.
- 1tph to Buxton, calling at Levenshulme, Heaton Chapel, Stockport, Davenport, Woodsmoor, Hazel Grove, Middlewood (1tp2h), Disley, New Mills Newtown, Furness Vale, Whaley Bridge, Chapel-en-le-Frith and Dove Holes (1tp2h).
- 1tph to Hazel Grove, calling at Levenshulme, Heaton Chapel, Stockport, Davenport and Woodsmoor (Monday to Saturday only).
- 2tph to Hadfield, calling at Ashburys, Guide Bridge, Flowery Field, Newton for Hyde, Godley, Hattersley, Broadbottom, Dinting and Glossop. Gorton is served additionally on Sundays.
- 4tp3h to Rose Hill Marple, calling at Gorton, Fairfield, Guide Bridge, Hyde North, Hyde Central, Woodley and Romiley (Monday to Saturday only).
- 1tph to New Mills Central, calling at Ashburys, Belle Vue, Ryder Brow, Reddish North, Brinnington, Bredbury, Romiley, Marple and Strines (Monday to Saturday only).
- 1tph to Sheffield, calling at Reddish North, Brinnington, Bredbury, Romiley, Marple, New Mills Central, Chinley, Edale, Hope, Bamford, Hathersage. Grindleford and Dore & Totley. Strines is served at peak times and all day on Sunday.

=== TransPennine Express ===
Services are operated on three routes:

North TransPennine:

- 1tph non-stop to Manchester Airport; calls at Gatley on Sundays.
- 1tph to Redcar Central, calling at Manchester Oxford Road, Manchester Victoria, Huddersfield, Dewsbury, Leeds, York, Thirsk, Northallerton, Yarm, Thornaby and Middlesbrough
- 1tph to York, calling at Stalybridge, Mossley, Greenfield, Marsden, Slaithwaite, Huddersfield, Mirfield, Wakefield Kirkgate, Normanton and Castleford.

South TransPennine:

- 1tph to Cleethorpes, calling at Stockport, Dore & Totley (limited), Sheffield, Meadowhall, Doncaster, Scunthorpe, Barnetby, Habrough and Grimsby Town.
- 1tph to Liverpool Lime Street, calling at Urmston, Irlam, Birchwood, Warrington Central, Warrington West (limited) and Liverpool South Parkway. Sunday services always call at Warrington West and do not call at Urmston or Irlam.

Anglo-Scottish Route:

- 1tph to Carlisle, calling at Manchester Oxford Road, Preston, Lancaster, Oxenholme Lake District and Penrith North Lakes; of which:
  - 1tp2h continue to Edinburgh Waverley, calling at Lockerbie and Haymarket
  - 1tp2h continue to Glasgow Central, calling at Lockerbie and Motherwell.
- 1tph non-stop to Manchester Airport.

=== Transport for Wales ===
- 1tph to Llandudno via the North Wales Main Line, calling at Manchester Oxford Road, Newton-le-Willows, Earlestown, Warrington Bank Quay, Runcorn East, Frodsham, Helsby, Chester, Shotton, Flint, Prestatyn, Rhyl, Abergele & Pensarn, Colwyn Bay, Llandudno Junction and Deganwy. Two trains per day run to Holyhead on weekdays only and some evening terminate at Chester.
- 1tph to Manchester Airport, calling at East Didsbury.
- 1tph to Cardiff Central via the Welsh Marches line, calling at Stockport, Wilmslow, Crewe, Shrewsbury, Church Stretton (irregular), Craven Arms (irregular), Ludlow, Leominster, Hereford, Abergavenny, Pontypool & New Inn (irregular), Cwmbran (irregular) and Newport. Alternate services continue either to Carmarthen, Fishguard Harbour, Milford Haven or Pembroke Dock.

Preceding station	National Rail	Following station
Terminus	Avanti West Coast West Coast Main Line	Stockport
Terminus	CrossCountry Manchester – Bristol/Bournemouth	Stockport
Terminus	Northern Trains Manchester to Stoke-on-Trent	Stockport
Terminus	Northern Trains Mid-Cheshire line	Stockport
Terminus	Transport for Wales Rail Welsh Marches Line	Stockport
Terminus	Northern Trains Buxton Line	Levenshulme
Terminus	Northern Trains Manchester to Crewe/Alderley Edge	Levenshulme
Terminus	Northern Trains Glossop Line	Ashburys
Terminus	Northern Trains Hope Valley Line	Ashburys
Terminus	Northern Trains Hope Valley Line	Reddish North
Terminus	Northern Trains Manchester to Rose Hill Marple	Gorton
Terminus	Northern Trains Styal line	Mauldeth Road
Manchester Oxford Road	Northern Trains Liverpool Lime Street to Manchester Airport	Mauldeth Road
Manchester Oxford Road	Northern Trains Blackpool North to Manchester Airport	Heald Green
Manchester Oxford Road	Northern Trains Blackpool North to Manchester Airport	Manchester Airport
Manchester Oxford Road	Northern Trains Barrow-in-Furness/Windermere to Manchester Airport	Gatley
Manchester Oxford Road	Northern Trains Barrow-in-Furness/Windermere to Manchester Airport	East Didsbury
Manchester Oxford Road	Transport for Wales Rail Manchester - Chester / North Wales Coast	East Didsbury
Manchester Oxford Road	Transport for Wales Rail Manchester - Chester / North Wales Coast	Manchester Airport
Manchester Oxford Road	East Midlands Railway Liverpool to Norwich	Stockport
Manchester Oxford Road	TransPennine Express South TransPennine	Stockport
Manchester Oxford Road	TransPennine Express Anglo-Scottish Route	Manchester Airport
Manchester Oxford Road	TransPennine Express North TransPennine	Manchester Airport
Manchester Oxford Road	TransPennine Express North TransPennine	Gatley
Terminus	TransPennine Express North TransPennine	Stalybridge
	Future services	
Manchester Airport High Speed	Avanti West Coast; High Speed 2	Terminus
Manchester Airport High Speed	TBA; Northern Powerhouse Rail	Bradford Interchange
Manchester Airport High Speed	TBA; Northern Powerhouse Rail	Sheffield

== Piccadilly tram stop ==
Piccadilly
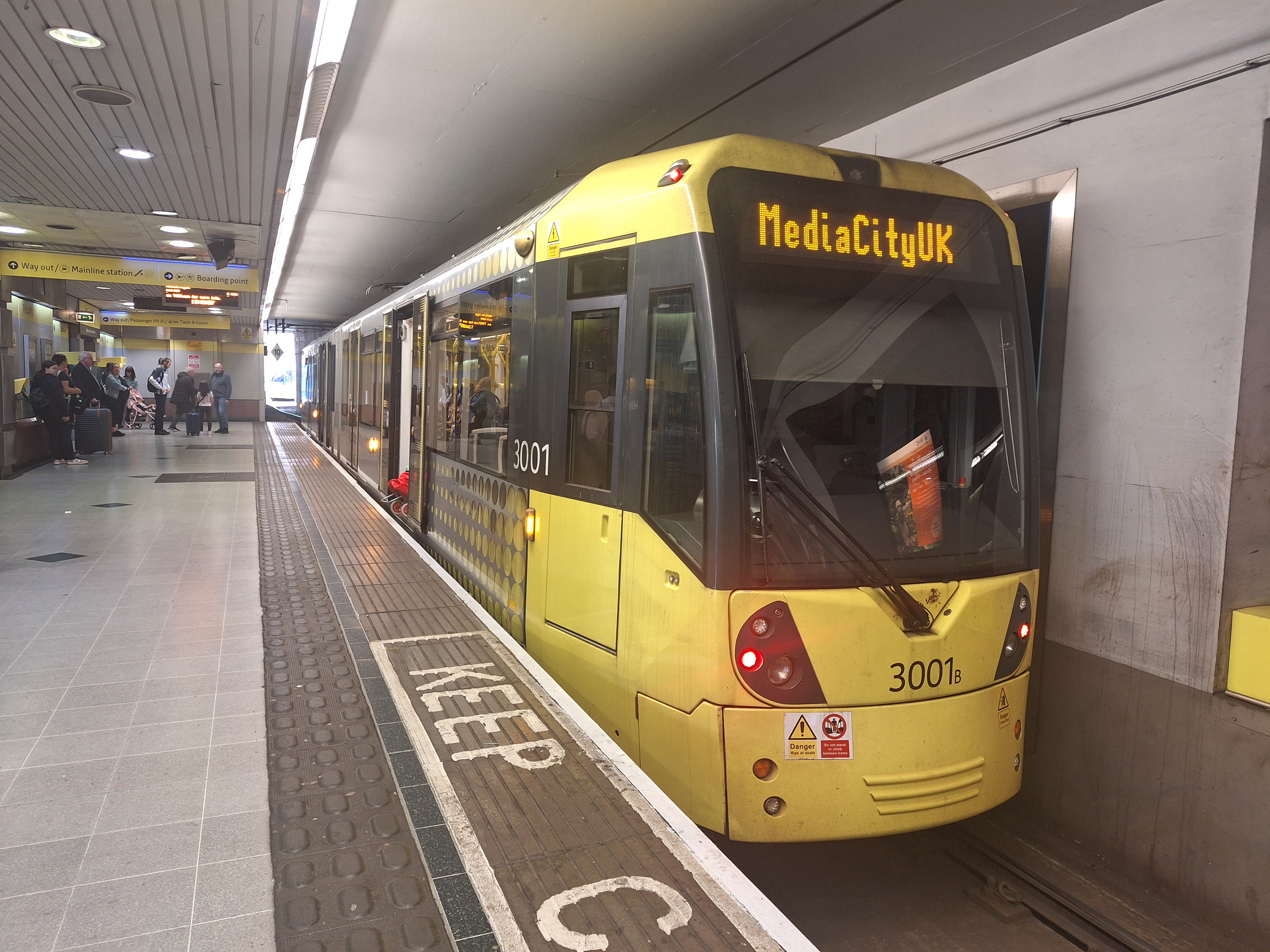
- Piccadilly tram stop showing the westbound platform, the eastbound platform is behind the wall on the right.

General information
- Location: Manchester city centre, City of Manchester; England
- Coordinates: 53.4770°N 2.2306°W
- Grid reference: SJ848978
- System: Metrolink station
- Line: Piccadilly spur
- Platforms: 2

Other information
- Status: In operation
- Fare zone: 1

History
- Opened: 20 July 1992
- Original company: Manchester Metrolink
Route map
Location

Piccadilly Metrolink tram stop is located at ground level in the undercroft underneath the main line station; an area of the station which was historically used for warehousing, it is one of nine stops serving Manchester city centre, within the system's Zone 1. Trams enter the stop from the streets in each direction via short tunnels. There are two platforms: one for eastbound trams towards Etihad Campus and Ashton-under-Lyne, and one for north and westbound trams towards Bury, Eccles and Altrincham. There are steps, lifts and escalators between the platform level and a mezzanine level, along with further steps, lifts and escalators that connect with the main line station's concourse. There are also multiple entrances present at ground level from the surrounding streets.

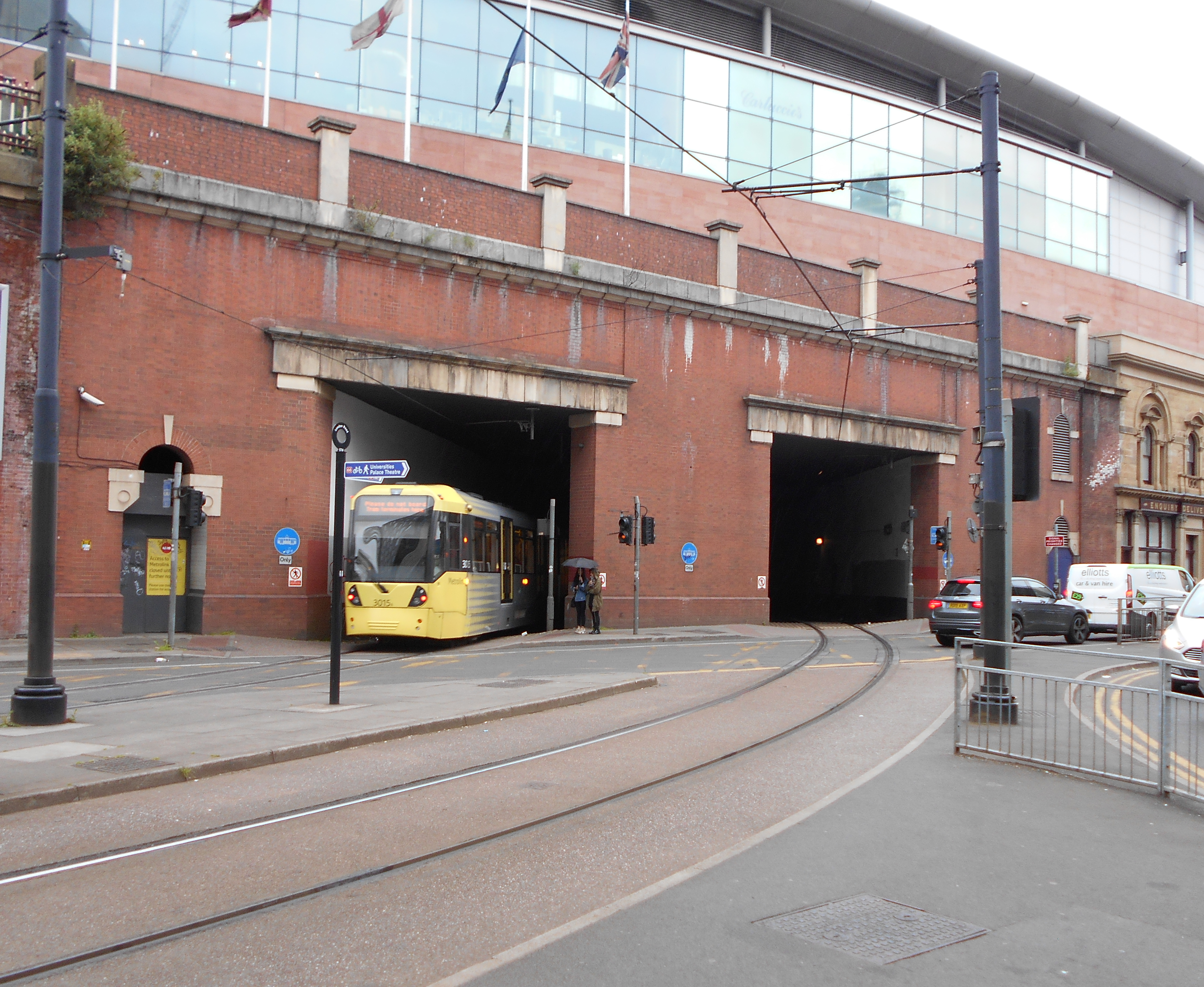
A tram entering Piccadilly from London Road. The tram station is located below the rail platforms in the undercroft.

The tram station was first opened on 20 July 1992, originally being known as Piccadilly Undercroft. As the stop was located directly underneath the main line station platforms, the then station operator British Rail required that it be built inside a protective concrete box, in order to protect the cast iron supports for the main line platforms from the possibility of collision or fire damage.

As Piccadilly originally served as a terminus of the system, early operations saw one platform being used for arrivals from Altrincham, Bury and later Eccles, with the other platform used for departures. Empty trams ran from the arrival platform into a nearby reversing siding in a tunnel, where they would reverse and then enter the departure platform. From the onset, the stop had been designed with future extension in mind; as such, since the opening of the extension towards Ashton in 2013, the former arrivals platform has also been used for departures towards Ashton as well as terminating trams, while the former departures platform also handles arrivals from Ashton. Terminating trams use a reversing siding on the Ashton line between Piccadilly and New Islington tram stops.

During 2008, the tram station was refurbished, after which it became the first station to display the new Metrolink corporate identity. Station signage bears the yellow and silver livery as applied to the new generation of trams since 2009.

According to TfGM, the Piccadilly tram station is one of the most frequented stops on the Metrolink network.

It has been proposed by High Speed Two Limited that the existing Piccadilly stop be moved to a four-platform underground station beneath Manchester Piccadilly High Speed station. Provision for a second stop at ground-level to the east of the high speed station called Piccadilly Central is also proposed to provide for future expansions of the Metrolink network.

=== Metrolink services ===
As of 2024, Piccadilly tram stop is the terminus for Metrolink services to Bury, and Altrincham at most operating times (see table below), and a major stop on the through services to Eccles, MediaCityUK, Etihad Campus, and Ashton-under-Lyne. Services run every twelve minutes on each route at most operating times.

Preceding station	Manchester Metrolink	Following station
Piccadilly Gardens towards Bury	Bury–Piccadilly	Terminus
Piccadilly Gardens towards Altrincham	Altrincham–Piccadilly	Terminus
Piccadilly Gardens towards Altrincham	Altrincham–Etihad Campus (evenings and Sundays only)	New Islington towards Etihad Campus
Piccadilly Gardens towards MediaCityUK	MediaCityUK–Etihad Campus (peak only)	New Islington towards Etihad Campus
Piccadilly Gardens towards Eccles	Eccles–Ashton (peak only)	New Islington towards Ashton-under-Lyne
Piccadilly Gardens towards Eccles	Eccles–Ashton via MediaCityUK (off-peak only)	New Islington towards Ashton-under-Lyne

== Future proposals ==
In 2009, the Greater Manchester Integrated Transport Authority advocated reopening the neighbouring derelict Mayfield station to alleviate capacity problems but the proposal was not advanced; plans focused on increasing track capacity on the cross-city route between Piccadilly and Oxford Road stations were pursued.

=== Northern Hub ===
During the early 2010s, Network Rail promoted its Northern Hub plans, estimated to cost in excess of £560 million to improve the heavily congested rail network on the approach into Manchester. A pair of through platforms would be constructed at Piccadilly and the station linked to Manchester Victoria via the Ordsall Chord, cutting journey times on Trans-Pennine routes. The construction of the Ordsall Chord made it possible for trains from the airport to travel via platforms 13 and 14 and Oxford Road to Manchester Victoria and Leeds and via the Calder Valley Line to Bradford Interchange.

Phase 2 aims to alleviate congestion at platforms 13 and 14 by constructing a parallel elevated island platform and allow the minimum time between trains to be decreased from four to three minutes, improving reliability. It will allow four more trains per hour to be timetabled to Oxford Road including a second freight to Trafford Park. Approval for the platforms, at an estimated cost of £200 million, was announced during July 2012.

The proposals would simplify train operations at Piccadilly, creating close associations between pairs of lines leading out of the station and particular platforms while requiring only a few crossing moves. Platforms 1 to 4 would be primarily used for services on the 'east' lines, to and from Marple, Glossop and Huddersfield; platforms 5 to 12 would be for services on the 'fast' lines, to and from Crewe and Stoke; through platforms 13 to 16 would be dedicated to services on the present 'slow' lines, to and from Manchester Airport and Hazel Grove.

In July 2013, Network Rail consulted on three options for the additional platforms at Piccadilly, all of which would affect local roads and the Grade II listed Star and Garter public house.

Construction was originally due to begin in 2016, but the project was delayed indefinitely. In 2023, Network Rail stated plans for the new platforms had been shelved to allow improvements to Manchester Victoria and Salford Crescent stations to go ahead instead.

=== High Speed 2 ===
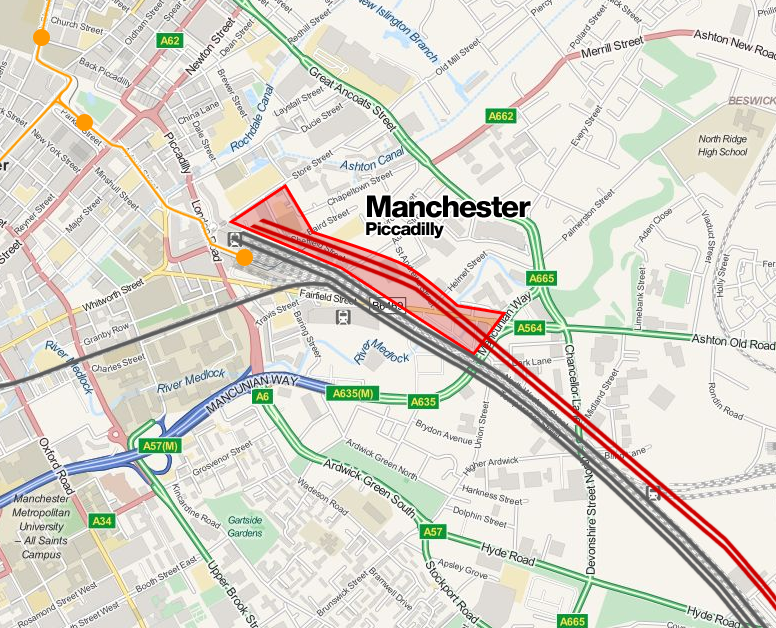
Map of the proposed expansion of Piccadilly for the HS2 project

To accommodate High Speed 2 (HS2), an extension would require four platforms and a 7.5 miles (12.1 km) tunnel under south Manchester to join the West Coast Main Line at Ardwick. Journey times to Manchester Airport would be reduced to 9 minutes from 18, Birmingham 41 minutes from 86 minutes, and London 68 minutes from 128. Station upgrades could include enhanced Metrolink services, improved road access and car parking. The line is planned to be completed by 2032.

A major redevelopment of the station and surrounding area has been proposed to complement the HS2 proposals involving the construction of a canopy over the HS2 platforms, the creation of a new entrance, and office, retail and residential development. Designs indicate that the derelict Mayfield station and the Gateway House office block will be demolished. The plans were approved by the Government in November 2016.

In October 2023, the portion of HS2 north of Birmingham was announced to be cancelled at the Conservative Party conference in Manchester.

=== Northern Powerhouse Rail ===
Northern Powerhouse Rail (NPR) proposals include the construction of new platforms under Piccadilly station and the proposed HS2 platforms. The 2016 'Manchester Piccadilly Options Assessment' by the National Infrastructure Commission stated: "Addition of Northern Powerhouse Rail and Station to the Manchester Piccadilly system will be the last step of the process of transforming the station in to [sic] a transport super hub. The NPR station and its construction will need to be considered throughout the design and implementation of the other station improvements, which form the station concept but which are delivered earlier. The NPR station is proposed to stay underground on its way east as it passes through Manchester city. This provides opportunities and offers location and orientation alternatives. Staying under the existing Piccadilly station or positioning NPR under the HS2 station box will maximise interchange efficiencies and travel distances. The orientation will also dictate the number of vertical connection cores also referred to as “drums” and their locations. The drums will have the function to connect all levels of transport to one and other [sic] at critical junction points."

During October 2017, according to a report to the Manchester City Council’s executive of the various proposals submitted, the development of an underground station has been selected as the preferred option for accommodating the envisioned NPR services, which are speculated to involve the running of up to eight trains per hour, as well as connecting services with the in-development HS2. The importance of directly integrating this underground facility with the existing Piccadilly Station has been emphasised as well; however, the report observes that the necessary financing for the programme is still lacking.
