= Bramhall railway station =

Railway station in Greater Manchester, England

Coordinates: 53.360°N 2.163°W

Bramhall
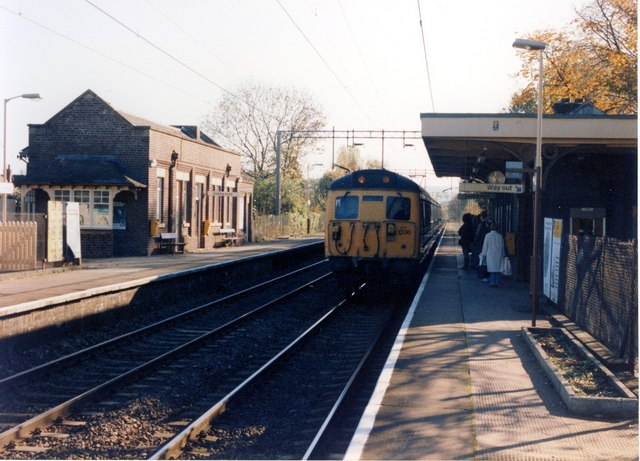
- Bramhall railway station in 1988

General information
- Location: Bramhall, Stockport; England
- Grid reference: SJ892848
- Managed by: Northern Trains
- Platforms: 2

Other information
- Station code: BML
- Classification: DfT category E

History
- Opened: 1845

Passengers
- 2020/21: ▼38,604
- 2021/22: ▲0.138 million
- 2022/23: ▲0.149 million
- 2023/24: ▲0.187 million
- 2024/25: ▲0.214 million
Location
Notes
- Passenger statistics from the Office of Rail and Road

Bramhall railway station serves the district of Bramhall, in the Metropolitan Borough of Stockport, Greater Manchester, England. It lies 9¾ miles (16 km) south of Manchester Piccadilly on the Stafford to Manchester Line.

== History ==
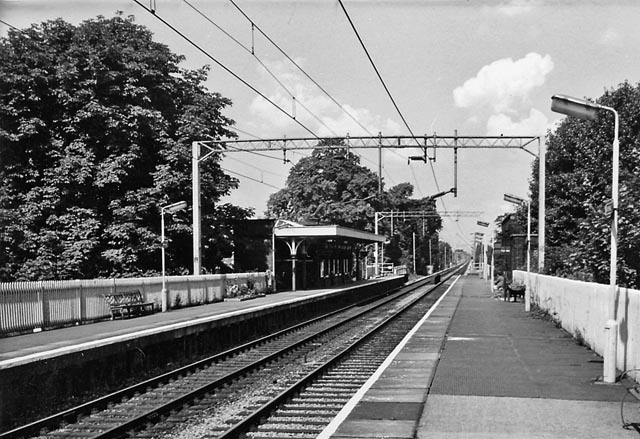
The station in 1966

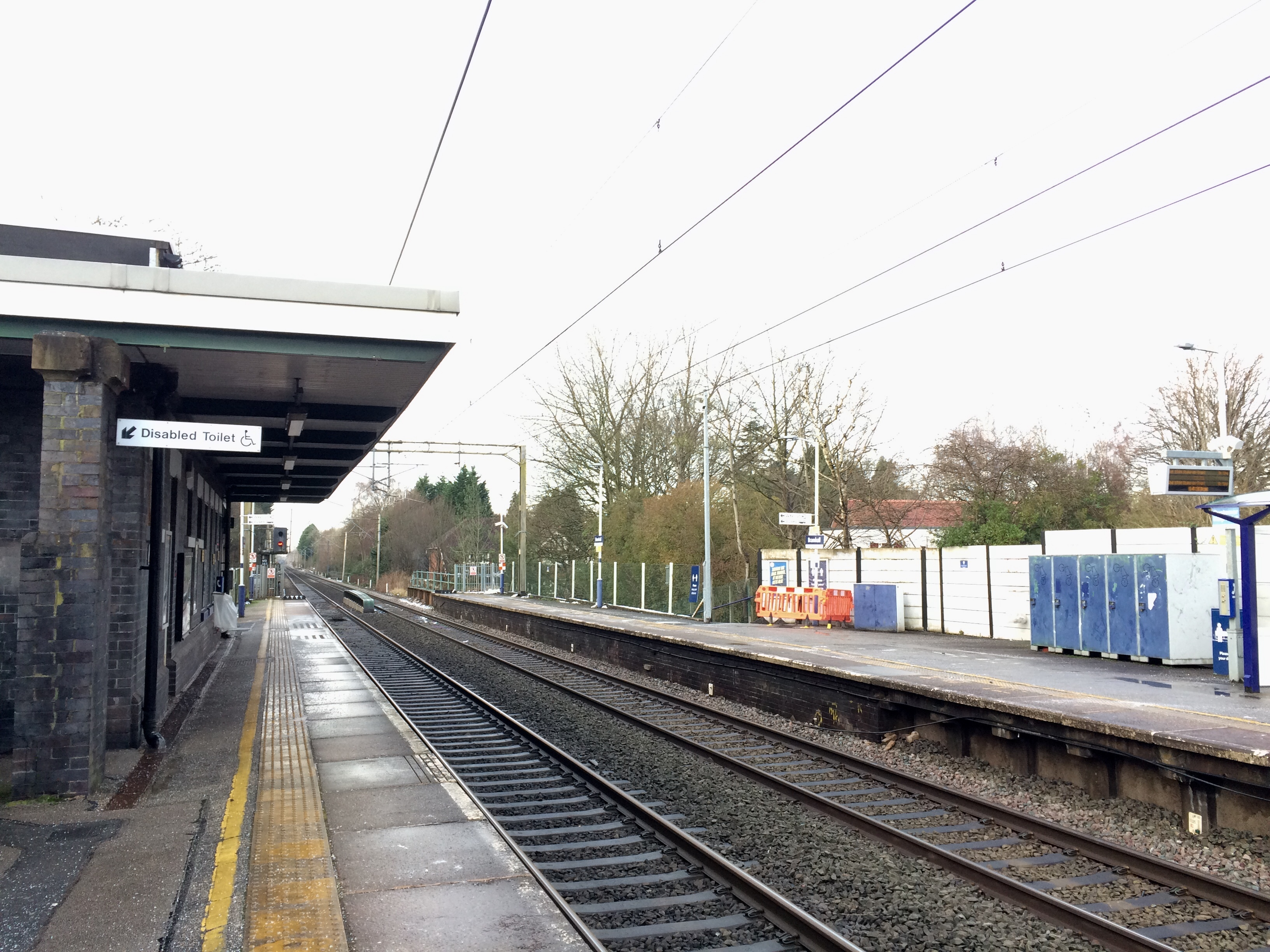
The station in 2021

Bramhall station was opened in 1845 by the London and North Western Railway.

== Facilities ==
There is a ticket machine, staffed ticket office and waiting room on platform 1 (the Manchester-bound side). Train running information is provided by CIS displays on both platforms.

== Service ==
Northern Trains operates an hourly service northbound to Manchester Piccadilly and southbound to Stoke-on-Trent, with additional services at peak times; a number of late evening services start/terminate at Macclesfield. The Sunday service from the station is limited, with just six trains each way.

Preceding station	National Rail	Following station
Poynton	Northern Trains Stoke-on-Trent – Manchester Piccadilly (Local stopping service)	Cheadle Hulme
