= Handforth railway station =

Railway station in Cheshire, England

Coordinates: 53.346°N 2.213°W

Handforth
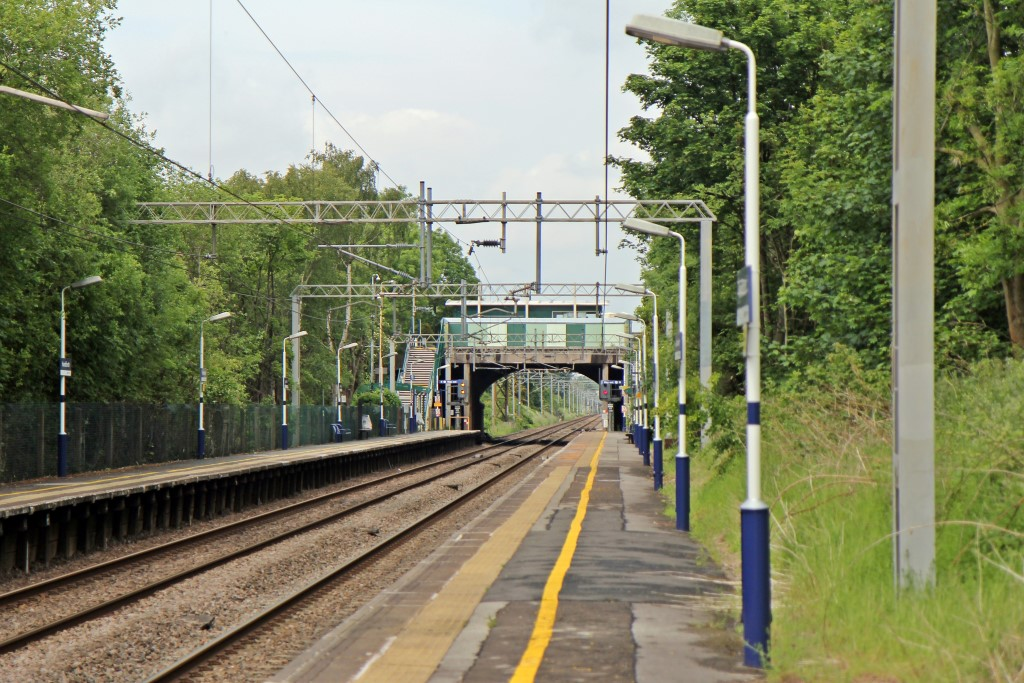
- View from the end of the southbound platform, looking northwards, in 2015

General information
- Location: Handforth, Cheshire East; England
- Grid reference: SJ858833
- Managed by: Northern
- Platforms: 2

Other information
- Station code: HTH
- Classification: DfT category E

Key dates
- 4 August 1958: Goods traffic ceased

Passengers
- 2020/21: ▼73,226
- 2021/22: ▲0.196 million
- 2022/23: ▲0.240 million
- 2023/24: ▲0.362 million
- 2024/25: ▼0.333 million
Location
Notes
- Passenger statistics from the Office of Rail and Road

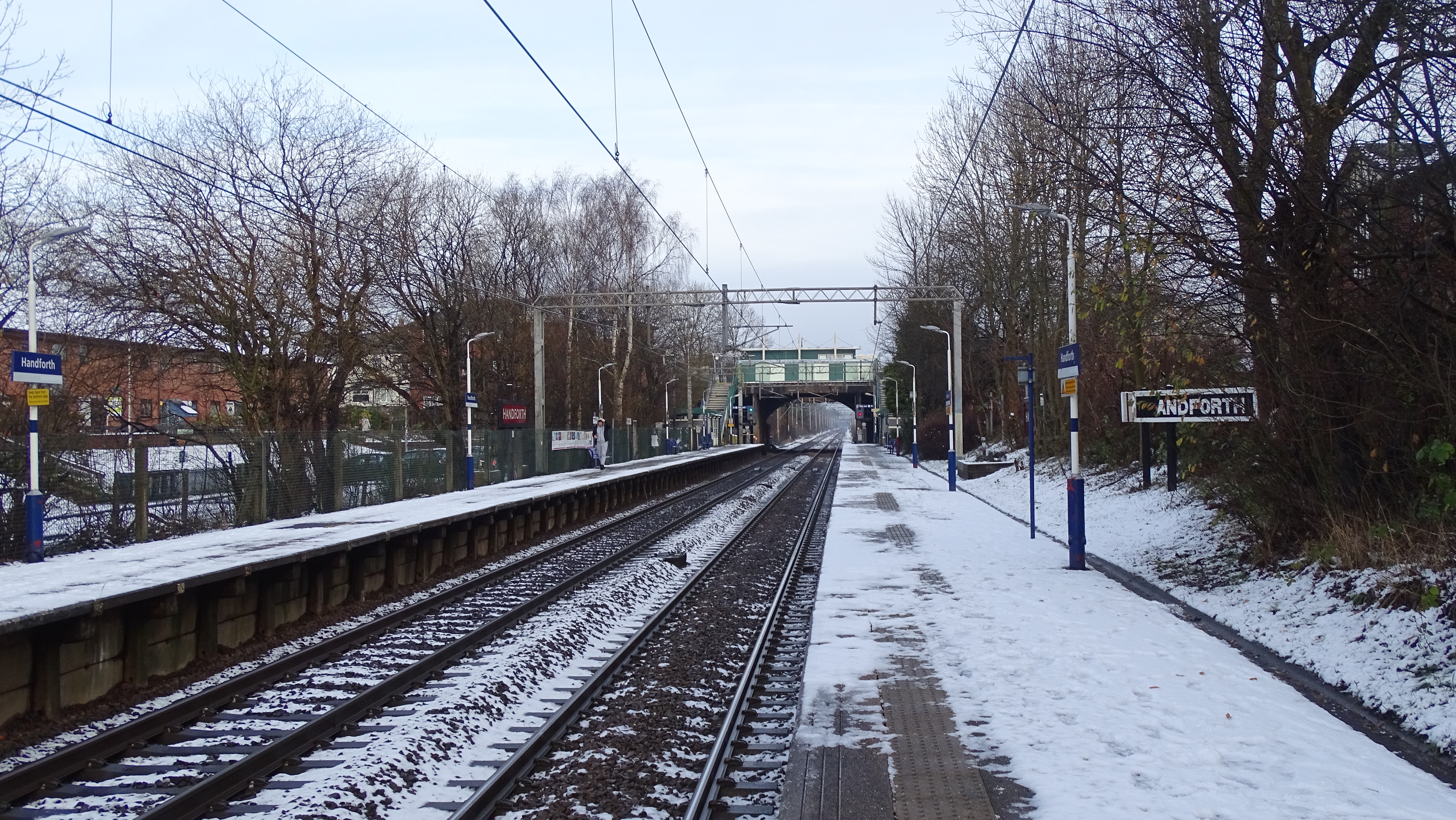
View from the end of the southbound platform, looking northwards, in 2020

Handforth railway station serves Handforth, Cheshire, England. Opened in 1842, it is a stop on the Crewe to Manchester Line.

== History ==
Handforth station opened on 10 May 1842, when the Manchester and Birmingham Railway to Crewe was completed. The northbound ("down") platform was approximately 82 yards (75 m) north of its current location. In 1846, the MBR merged with two other companies to form the London and North Western Railway.

Since opening, the station has served mainly commuters to Manchester.

== Services ==
Northern Trains provides an hourly service between Manchester Piccadilly, Stockport and Crewe; there is also an hourly service between Manchester Piccadilly and Alderley Edge. On Sundays, there is an hourly service between Manchester Piccadilly and Crewe.

Preceding station	National Rail	Following station
Cheadle Hulme	Northern Trains Crewe-Manchester line	Wilmslow

== Friends of Handforth Station ==
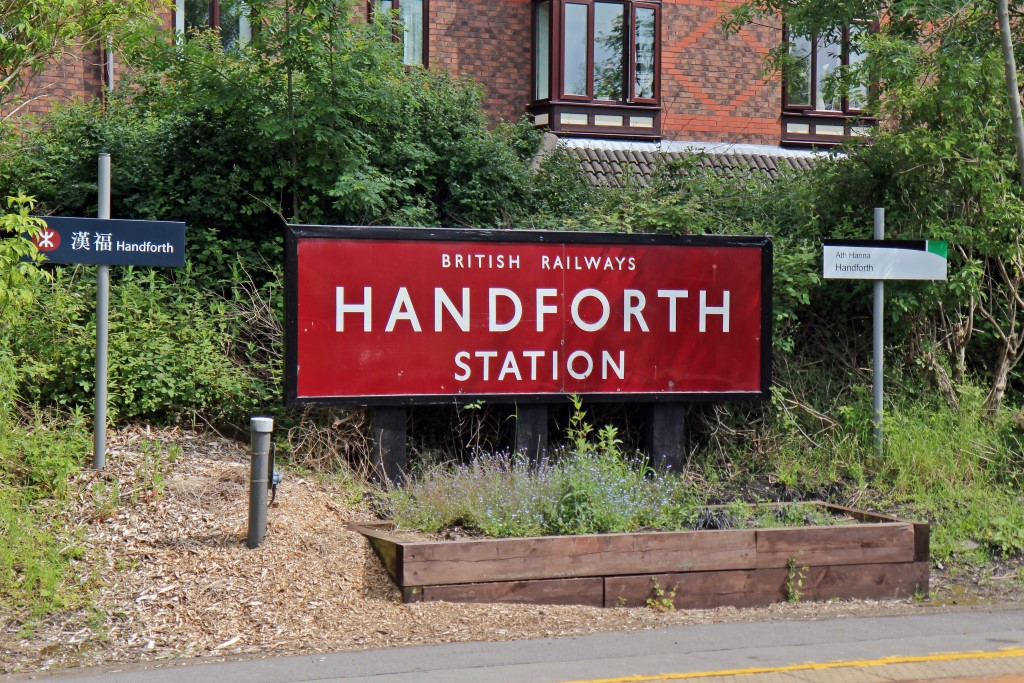
Various nameboards on the southbound platform

The Friends of Handforth Station, formed in 1996, are an active station adoption group who have carried out a number of projects at the station, including a station garden, sculptures, poetry and signs from railway operators in other countries.

The group works towards securing easier platform access for disabled passengers and those with prams, bikes etc.
