= Prestbury railway station =

Railway station in Cheshire, England

Coordinates: 53.293°N 2.145°W

Prestbury
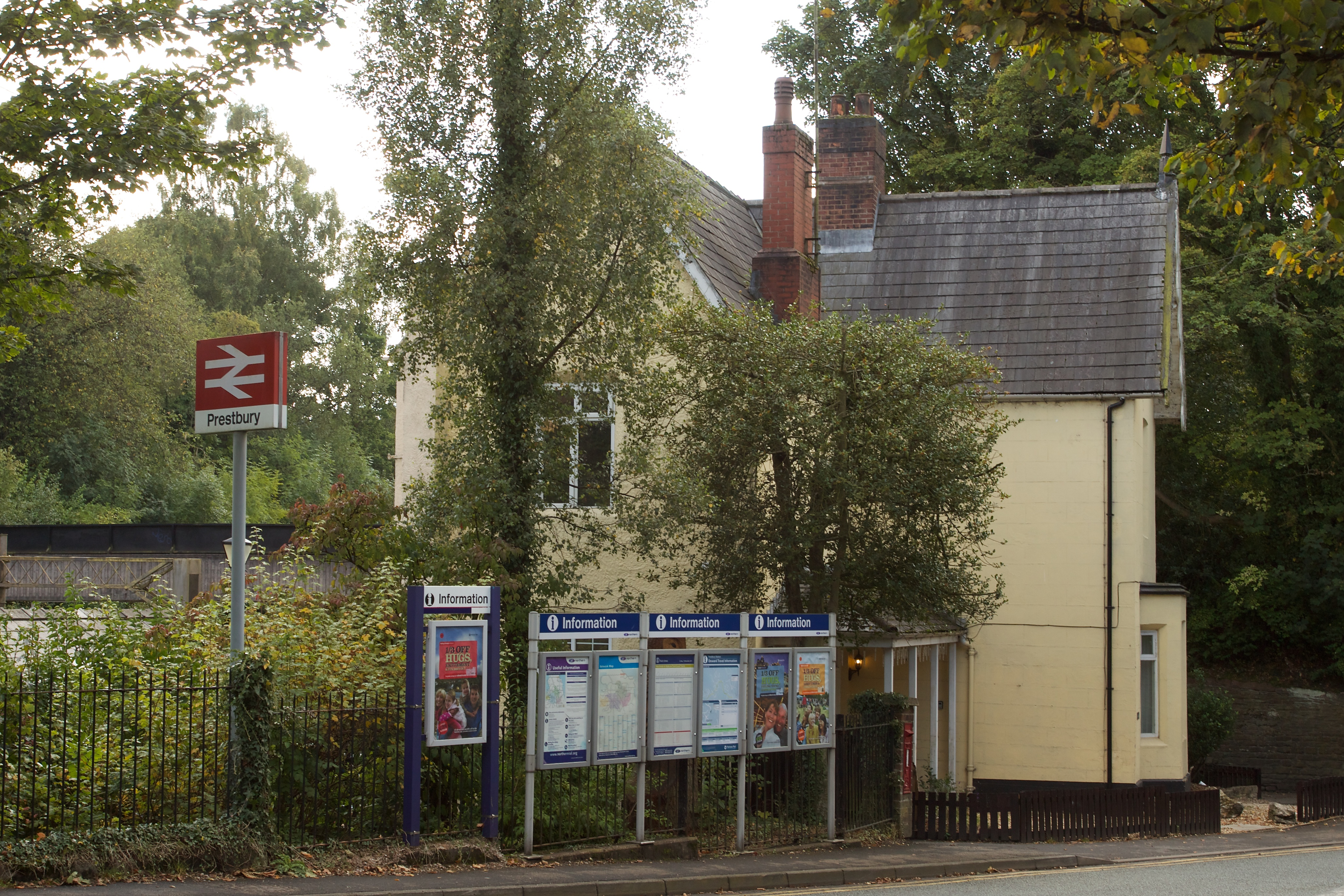
- Prestbury station building

General information
- Location: Prestbury, Cheshire East; England
- Grid reference: SJ904773
- Manager: Northern Trains
- Platforms: 2

Other information
- Station code: PRB
- Classification: DfT category F1

History
- Opened: 24 November 1845

Passengers
- 2021/22: ▲32,562
- 2022/23: ▲40,942
- 2023/24: ▲58,562
- 2024/25: ▲64,196
- 2025/26: ▼59,846
Location
Notes
- Passenger statistics from the Office of Rail and Road

Prestbury railway station serves the village of Prestbury, in Cheshire, England. It is a stop on the Stafford-Manchester line, a spur of the West Coast Main Line.

== History ==
Opened by the London and North Western Railway on 24 November 1845, it became part of the London, Midland and Scottish Railway during the Grouping of 1923. The line then passed on to the London Midland Region of British Railways on nationalisation in 1948.

When sectorisation was introduced, the station was served by Regional Railways until the privatisation of British Rail.

== Facilities ==
There is a car park and ticket machine at the station. Both platforms have waiting shelters; the southbound platform is only accessible via footbridge.

== Service ==
Northern Trains operates hourly services in each direction between Stoke-on-Trent, Macclesfield, Stockport and Manchester Piccadilly. There are five trains each way on Sundays which is planned to returned to 6 trains each way in 2027.

Preceding station	National Rail	Following station
Macclesfield	Northern Trains Stoke-on-Trent - Manchester Piccadilly (Local stopping service)	Adlington (Cheshire)
Macclesfield	Northern Trains Stoke-on-Trent - Manchester Piccadilly (Local stopping service)	Poynton
