= Adlington railway station (Cheshire) =

Railway station in Cheshire, England

Coordinates: 53.320°N 2.134°W

Adlington (Cheshire)
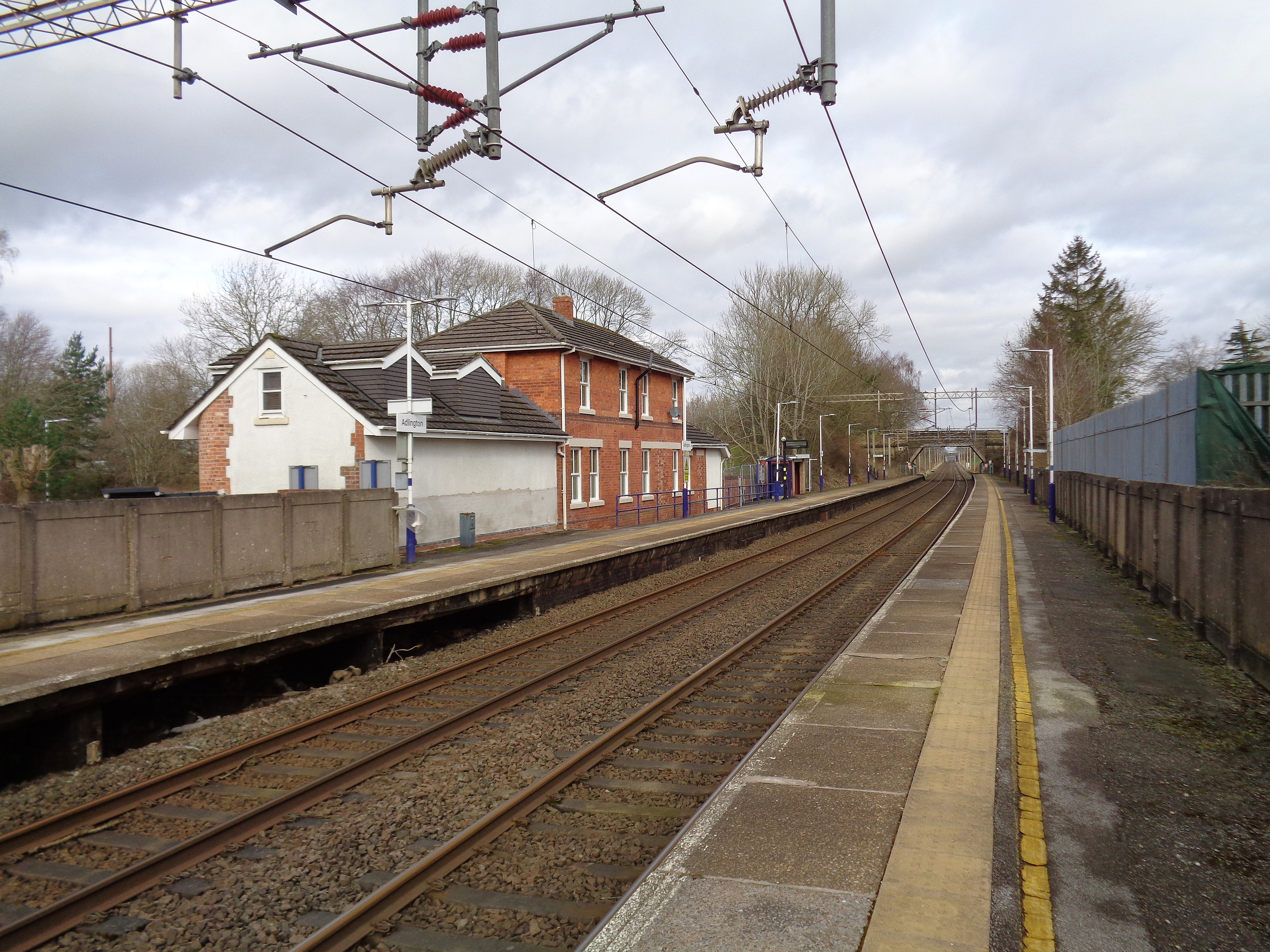

General information
- Location: Adlington, Cheshire East; England
- Grid reference: SJ911803
- Manager: Northern Trains
- Platforms: 2

Other information
- Station code: ADC
- Classification: DfT category E

History
- Opened: 24 November 1845

Passengers
- 2021/22: ▲17,284
- 2022/23: ▲18,782
- 2023/24: ▲26,046
- 2024/25: ▼24,710
- 2025/26: ▼23,656
Location
Notes
- Passenger statistics from the Office of Rail and Road

Adlington (Cheshire) railway station serves the village of Adlington, in Cheshire, England. It is a stop on the Stafford-Manchester line, a spur of the West Coast Main Line.

== History ==
Opened by the London and North Western Railway, it became part of the London, Midland and Scottish Railway during the Grouping of 1923. The line then passed on to the London Midland Region of British Railways on nationalisation in 1948.

When sectorisation was introduced, the station was served by Regional Railways until the privatisation of British Rail.

== Facilities ==
The station is now unstaffed and there is a ticket machine. A car park is available for railway users.

== Passenger volume ==
Passenger Volume at Adlington (Cheshire)
	2019-20	2020-21	2021-22	2022-23	2023-24	2024-25
Entries and exits	27,278	5,114	17,284	18,782	26,046	24,710

== Service ==
Northern Trains operates hourly services in each direction between Stoke-on-Trent, Macclesfield, Stockport and Manchester Piccadilly. There are six trains each way on Sundays.

Preceding station	National Rail	Following station
Prestbury	Northern Trains Stoke-on-Trent - Manchester Piccadilly (Local stopping service)	Poynton
