= Poynton railway station =

Railway station in Cheshire, England

Poynton
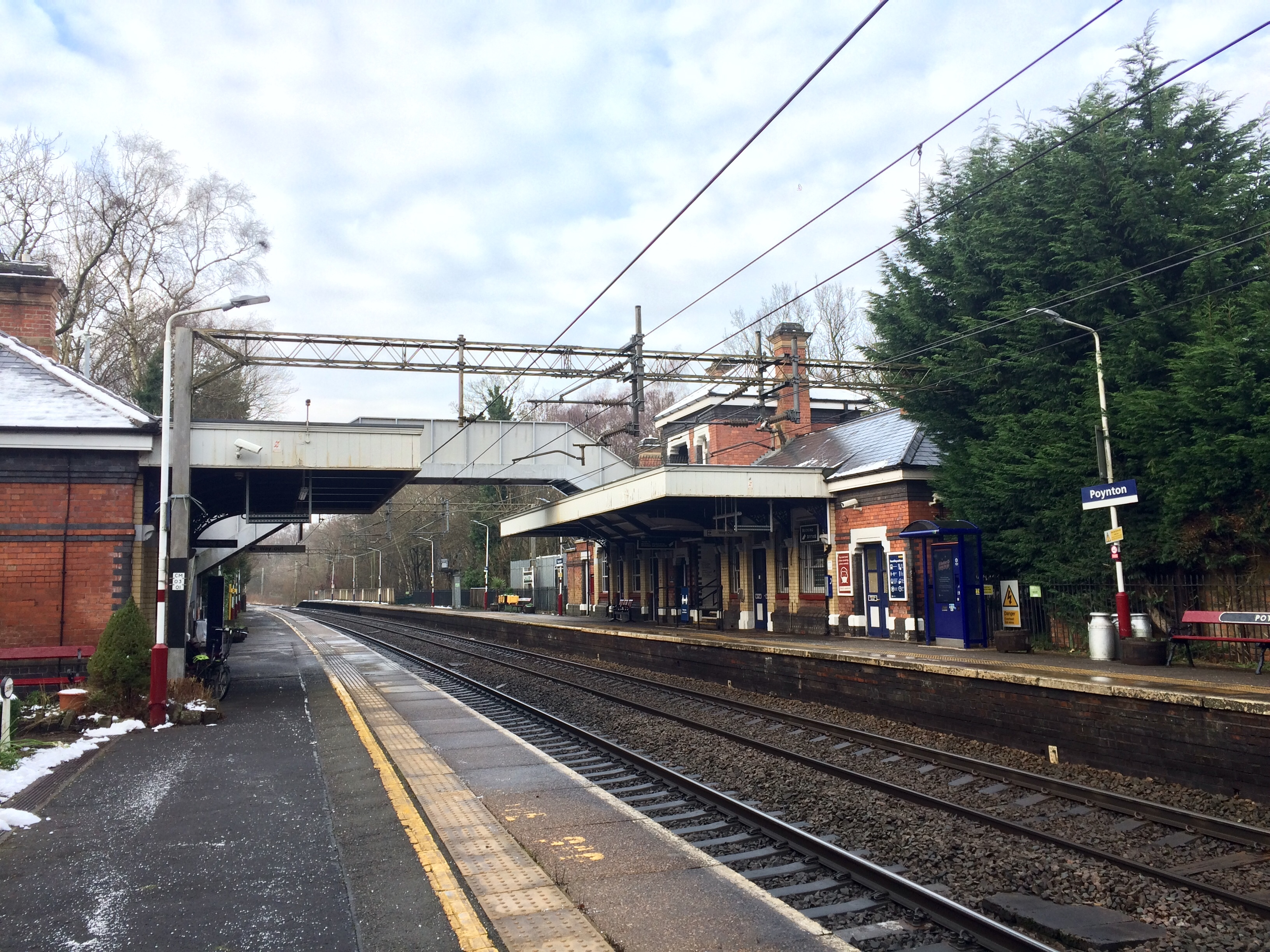
- View northbound in 2021

General information
- Location: Poynton; Cheshire East; England
- Coordinates: 53.3503°N 2.1345°W
- Grid reference: SJ911837
- Manager: Northern Trains
- Platforms: 2

Other information
- Station code: PYT
- Classification: DfT category E

History
- Opened: 1 August 1887

Key dates
- 1963: Signal box closed

Passengers
- 2021/22: ▲0.131 million
- 2022/23: ▲0.162 million
- 2023/24: ▲0.192 million
- 2024/25: ▲0.210 million
- 2025/26: ▼0.203 million
Location
Notes
- Passenger statistics from the Office of Rail and Road

Poynton railway station serves the town of Poynton in Cheshire, England.

The station is on Cheshire East Council's local list of heritage buildings. It was built in 1887.

The station is staffed between the hours of 06:30 and 13:00 Monday to Friday and 07:30 and 14:00 on Saturdays. It is unstaffed on Sundays.

== History ==
Poynton station was built to replace an earlier station called Poynton (Midway) that opened in a different location on 24 November 1845 and remained open until this new station was fully operational on 1 August 1887.

The station has, in the past, been subjected to regular vandalism. The station's toilets and bike shed are no longer open to the public. The station is painted in First North Western colours, the colours of a previous train operator which were very similar to and were adopted by another previous train operator Northern Rail.

The station's footbridge, both roofs and Manchester-bound platform waiting room were refurbished in spring 2011. At the same time, new lighting and CCTV were installed. There are card-only ticket machines one both platforms which issue promise to pay vouchers for passengers wishing to pay by cash.

== Best Station Award ==
The station has been adopted by a local garden centre and has since won the award for Cheshire Best Kept Station in 2007, Best Kept Gardens in 2013, the WW1 Commemoration Award in 2014 and Cheshire Best Kept Station again in 2015.

== Service pattern ==
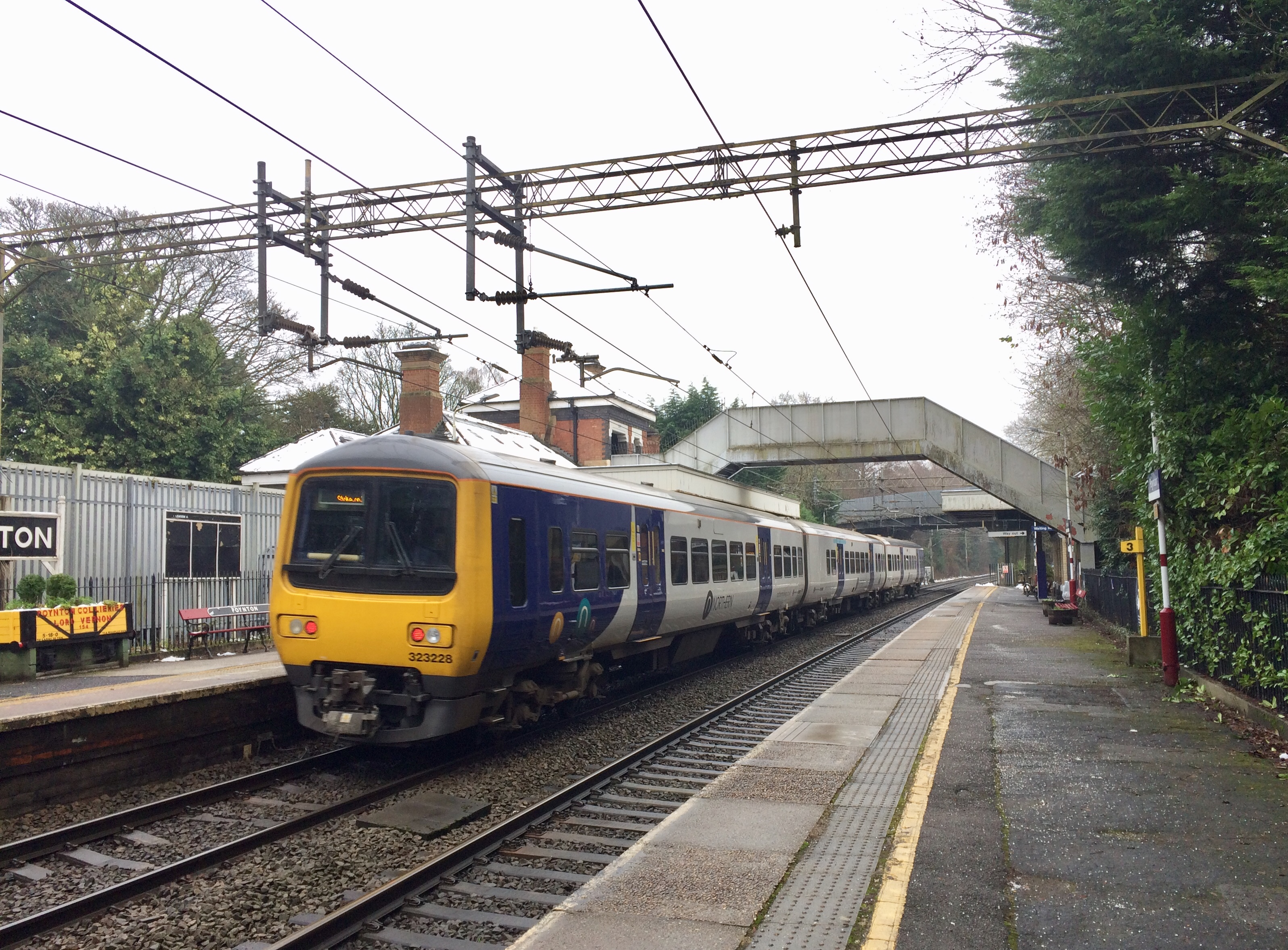
A Northern Trains Class 323 calls with a service to Stoke-on-Trent in 2021

Northern Trains operate an hourly service to Stoke-on-Trent southbound and Manchester Piccadilly northbound. Some early morning/late night services originate/terminate at Macclesfield. Additional services operate at peak commuter times and after 10pm. There are six services in each direction on Sundays.

From May 2018, Monday to Saturday train services were set to be increased to operate every half-hour in each direction to Manchester Piccadilly and Macclesfield, with 1 northbound service per hour continuing to Blackpool North and one southbound service continuing to Stoke-on-Trent. Sunday services had been scheduled to operate hourly to Blackpool North and Stoke-on-Trent. Due to delays in the Bolton corridor electrification and timetabling complications, these changes did not take effect. Minor improvements were made in December 2018, with additional minor enhancements.

| Preceding station | National Rail | Following station |
|---|---|---|
| Adlington (Cheshire) | Northern Trains Stoke-on-Trent – Manchester Piccadilly (Local stopping service) | Bramhall |
| Prestbury | Northern Trains Stoke-on-Trent – Manchester Piccadilly (Local stopping service) | Bramhall |
| Macclesfield | Northern Trains Stoke-on-Trent – Manchester Piccadilly (Local stopping service) | Bramhall |
