= Baguley railway station =

Former railway station in Manchester, England

Baguley
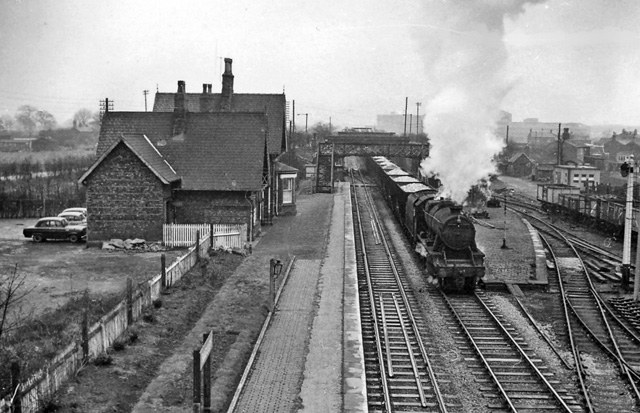
- Baguley railway station in April 1962, with an ICI limestone train heading for Northwich

General information
- Location: Baguley, Manchester; England
- Coordinates: 53.39896°N 2.30738°W
- Grid reference: SJ796891
- Platforms: 3

Other information
- Status: Disused

History
- Original company: Stockport, Timperley and Altrincham Junction Railway
- Pre-grouping: Cheshire Lines Committee
- Post-grouping: Cheshire Lines Committee

Key dates
- 1 December 1865: Station opened
- 30 November 1964: Station closed
Location

Baguley railway station served in the area of Baguley in Wythenshawe, south Manchester, England. It was sited at the extreme western edge of Baguley, near the southern end of Brooklands Road where Shady Lane crossed the railway line.

== History ==
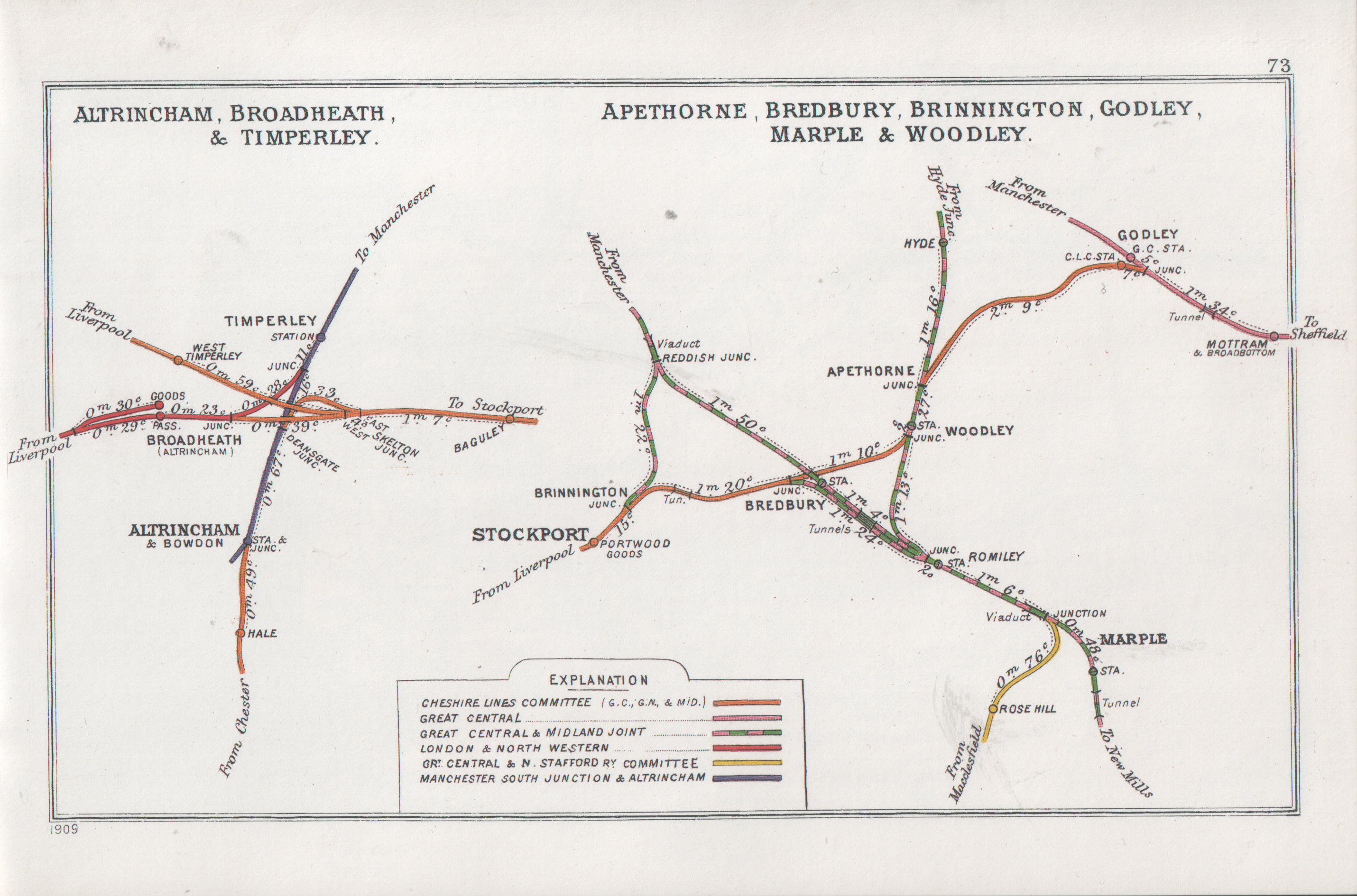
A 1909 Railway Clearing House junction diagram, showing railways in the vicinity of Baguley (left)

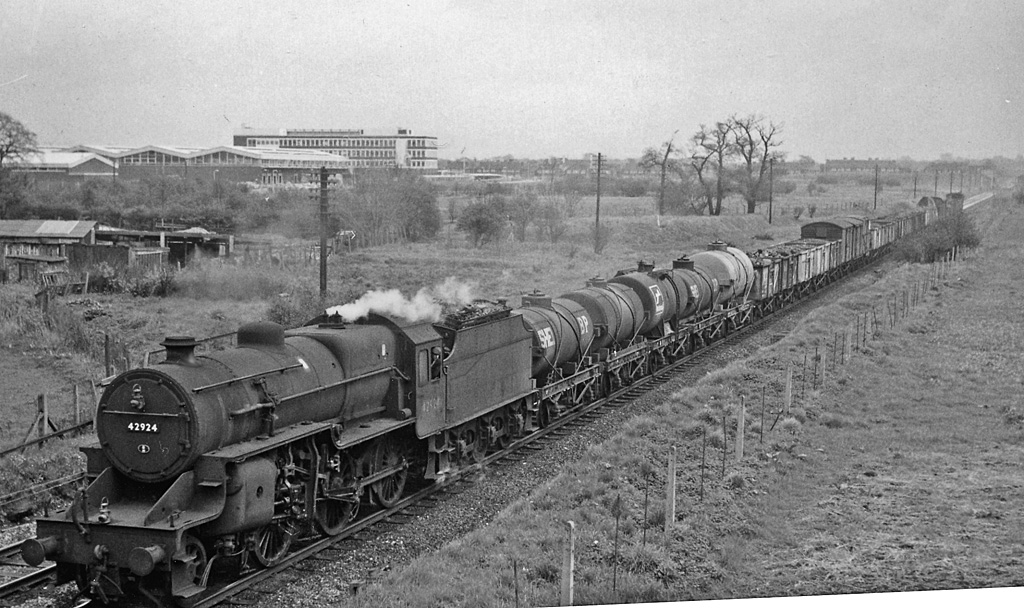
Westbound freight train approaching Baguley station, in 1965

Served by the Stockport, Timperley and Altrincham Junction Railway (ST&AJ), Baguley station was opened on 1 December 1865. From 15 August 1867, the ST&AJ became part of the Cheshire Lines Committee (CLC) and from the Grouping of 1923, the CLC was owned jointly by the London and North Eastern Railway and London, Midland and Scottish Railway companies. The station then passed under the control of the London Midland Region of British Railways upon nationalisation in 1948.

Baguley station was served by local passenger trains between Stockport Tiviot Dale, Warrington Central and Liverpool Central; a separate service also operated from Stockport to Altrincham.

For most of the station's existence, the passenger trains were hauled by steam locomotives but, for a period up to the beginning of the Second World War, the services between Stockport and Altrincham were performed by the CLC's Sentinel steam railcars.

The station closed on 30 November 1964, when passenger trains were withdrawn by British Railways. It was subsequently demolished.

Preceding station	Historical railways	Following station
Northenden; Line open, station closed	Cheshire Lines Committee; Stockport, Timperley and Altrincham Junction Railway	West Timperley; Line and station closed
Northenden; Line open, station closed	Cheshire Lines Committee; Stockport, Timperley and Altrincham Junction Railway	Altrincham; Line and station open
	Disused railways	
Northenden; Line open, station closed	LNWR; Warrington & Stockport Railway	Broadheath; Line and station closed

== The site today ==
The line through the former station site is still used by the following:

- Northern Trains' passenger services between Manchester Piccadilly, Stockport, Altrincham, Northwich and Chester
- Freight trains, including heavy block trains carrying limestone from quarries at Tunstead, near Buxton, to alkali works at Northwich.

Apartment blocks now occupy much of the station site.

== Potential reopening ==
In May 2011, reopening of the station on the Mid-Cheshire line was proposed in Transport for Greater Manchester's Passenger Plan. The station would be located on Southmoor Road and would be a tram/train interchange with Baguley tram stop, which opened on Manchester Metrolink's Airport line in 2014.
