= Stockport Portwood railway station =

Former railway station in England

Stockport Portwood

General information
- Other names: Portwood goods station
- Location: Portwood, Stockport; England
- Coordinates: 53.41646°N 2.15021°W
- Grid reference: SJ 390 391
- Platforms: 1

Other information
- Status: Disused

History
- Original company: Stockport and Woodley Junction Railway
- Pre-grouping: Cheshire Lines Committee
- Post-grouping: Cheshire Lines Committee

Key dates
- 12 January 1863: Opened for passengers as Stockport
- c. 1863/1864: Renamed Stockport Portwood
- 1865: Opened for goods
- 1 December 1865: Became a through station
- 1 September 1875: Closed to passengers
- 25 April 1966: Closed to goods except coal
- 27 March 1972: Closed to all traffic
Location

Location within Stockport's historical rail network

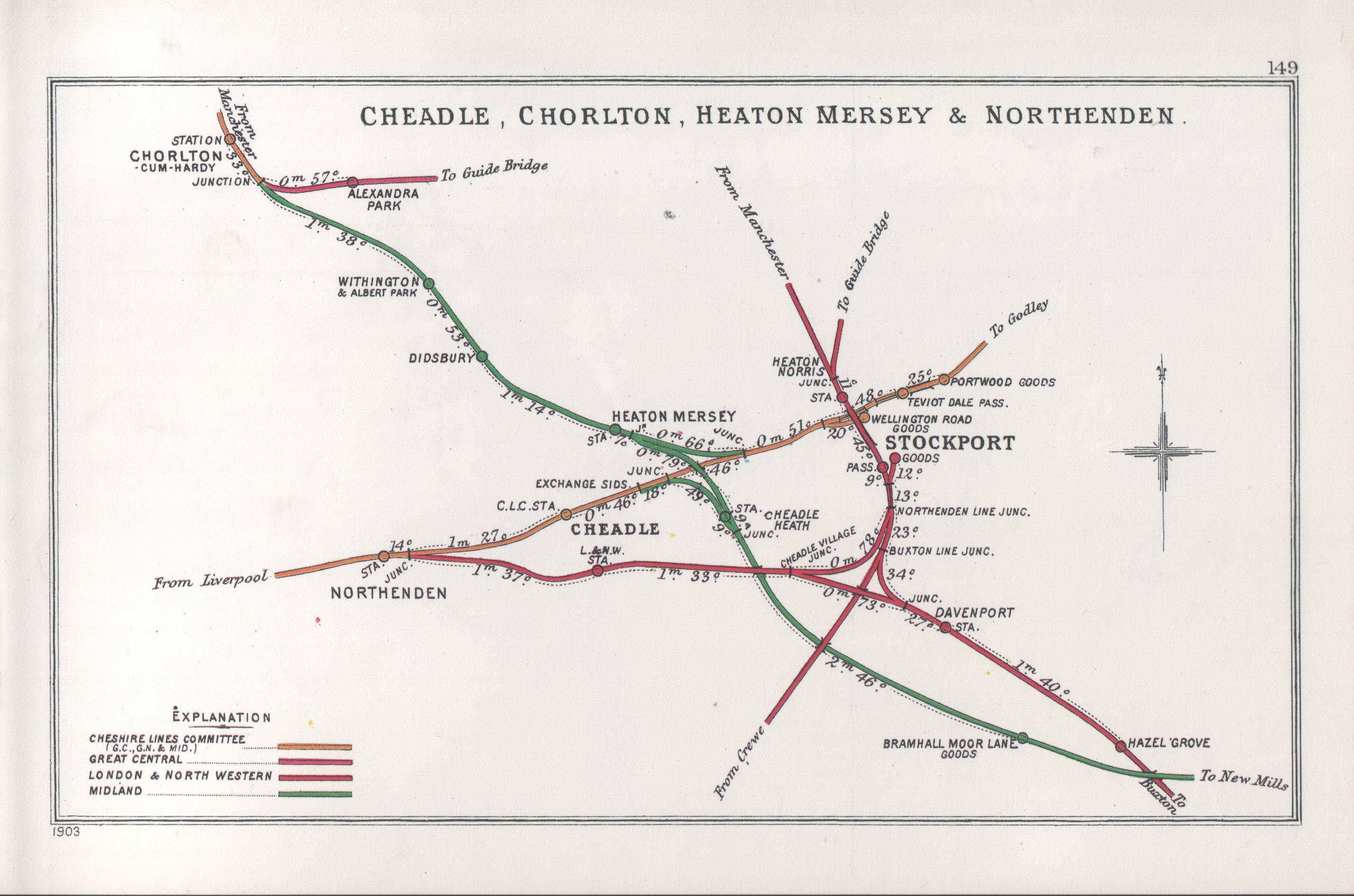
Cheadle, Chorlton, Heaton Mersey & Northenden in 1903, Stockport Portwood is top right

Stockport Portwood railway station was a railway station in Stockport, England on the Stockport and Woodley Junction Railway (later becoming part of Cheshire Lines Committee)

The station opened as Stockport as the western terminus of the Stockport and Woodley Junction Railway (S&WJR) when it opened on 12 January 1863. The line ran for 2¾ miles from Woodley on the MS&LR branch from Hyde to Marple. (Note: Butt (1990) suggests it opened on 1 December 1865 when the Stockport, Timperley and Altrincham Junction Railway opened.)

Sometime later in 1863 or in 1864 the station was renamed Stockport Portwood, and in 1865 it opened for goods traffic. In 1865 the Stockport, Timperley and Altrincham Junction Railway (ST&AJR) opened by making an end-on connection with the (S&WJR) and the station opened to through traffic, by this time both railways had become part of the Cheshire Lines Committee.

The station was located at Marsland Street which the railway crossed on an overbridge, the station appeared to have only one platform on the south eastern side of the double track running lines and several loops and sidings. There was a station building at street level with a ramp up to the platform, at least one building was on the platform, probably a shelter, and there was a signal box. A coal yard was located on the opposite side of the tracks.

After the opening of the route through to Altrincham in 1865 a more central station was opened at Stockport Tiviot Dale. Stockport Portwood then closing to passengers on 1 September 1875, when it became a goods station.

By 1898 there were more sidings, a substantial goods shed and a warehouse on site with road access from Hatherlow Street.

It remained in use until 25 April 1966 when it closed except for coal traffic which continued until 27 March 1972 when it closed entirely except for a private siding.

The line was officially closed in 1982 after not being used for two years following the exposure of a vertical shaft alongside the line while an extension to the M63 was being constructed. Today no trace of the station remains, the site being buried under a slip road of the M60.
