= Portwood =

Area of Stockport, in Greater Manchester, England

Coordinates: 53.415°N 2.145°W

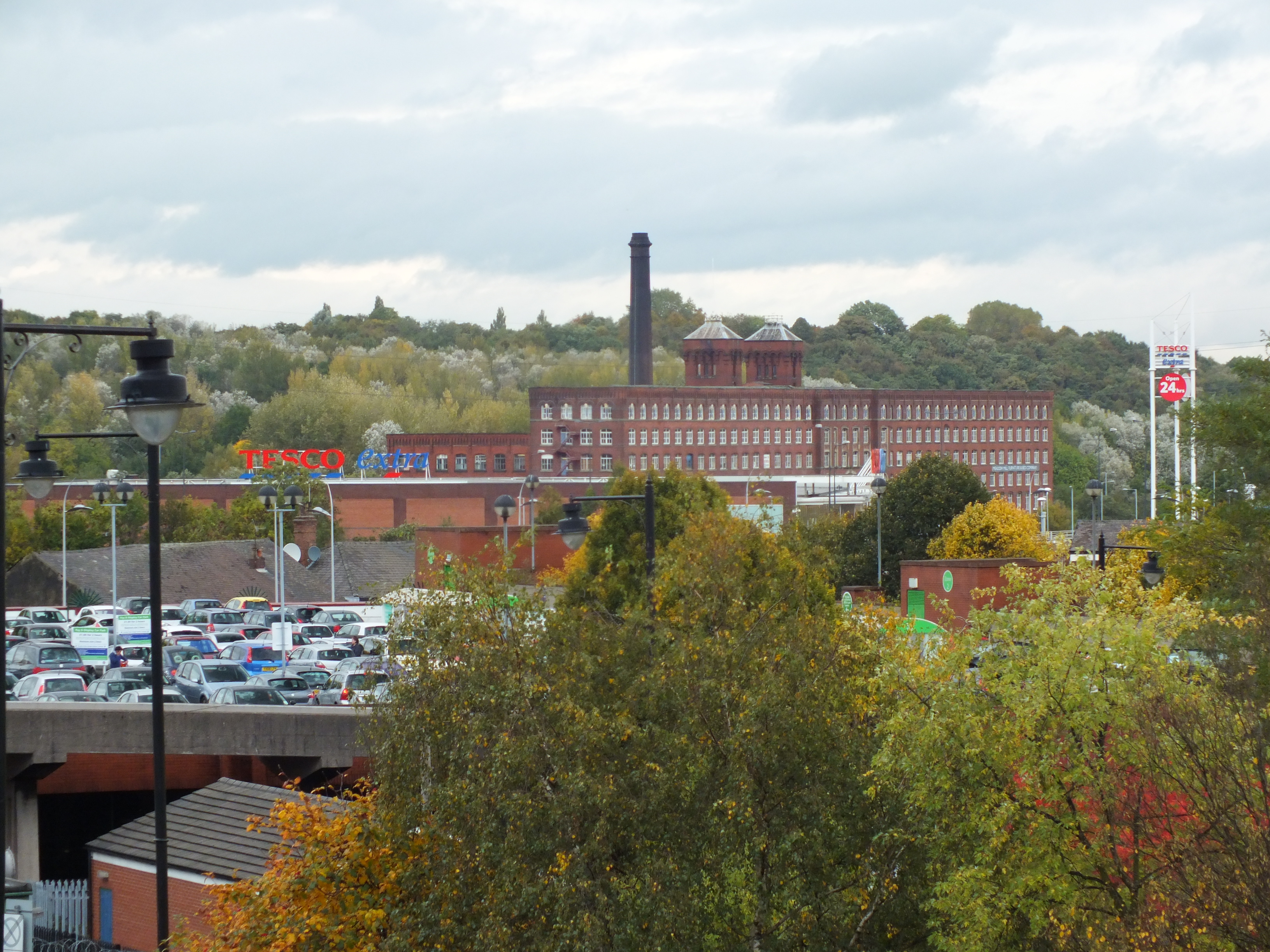
- Tesco supermarket and Meadow Mill in 2013

- Location within Greater Manchester
- OS grid reference: SJ910926
- Metropolitan borough: Stockport
- Metropolitan county: Greater Manchester
- Region: North West
- Country: England
- Sovereign state: United Kingdom
- Post town: STOCKPORT
- Postcode district: SK1
- Dialling code: 0161
- Police: Greater Manchester
- Fire: Greater Manchester
- Ambulance: North West
- UK Parliament: Stockport

Portwood is an area of Stockport, in Greater Manchester, England. It lies just east of the town centre, along Great Portwood Street. The rivers Tame and Goyt run through the area, along with the M60 motorway.

== Amenities ==
Within Portwood, the area closest to the town centre contains Meadow Mill and is mainly given over to the retail sector including the Peel Centre, a Tesco Extra, restaurants and takeaways; the outer part is residential.

The area is served by three pubs: The Queens, The Midway and The Park Inn. The Railway was demolished in 2022, despite being named the Campaign for Real Ale's National Pub of the Year in 2007 and featuring regularly in its national Good Beer Guide.

== Transport ==
The site of the former Stockport Portwood railway station lies under the M60 motorway; it served the area between 1863 and 1875 on the route between Manchester Central, Stockport Tiviot Dale, Woodley and Romiley.

The nearest National Rail stations are now at:

- Stockport: for Avanti West Coast inter-city services between Manchester Piccadilly and London Euston, with routes to other major locations in Great Britain by other operators; in addition, Northern Trains operates local services within Greater Manchester, Derbyshire and Cheshire.
- Bredbury and Brinnington: for Northern Trains services between Manchester Piccadilly, New Mills Central and Sheffield.

Bus services are operated by Stagecoach Manchester and Metroline Manchester; routes connect the area with Stockport Interchange, Manchester Piccadilly, Bredbury, Romiley, Marple, Hyde, Ashton-under-Lyne, Denton and Brinnington.
