= Cheadle North railway station =

Disused railway station in Greater Manchester, England

Cheadle North
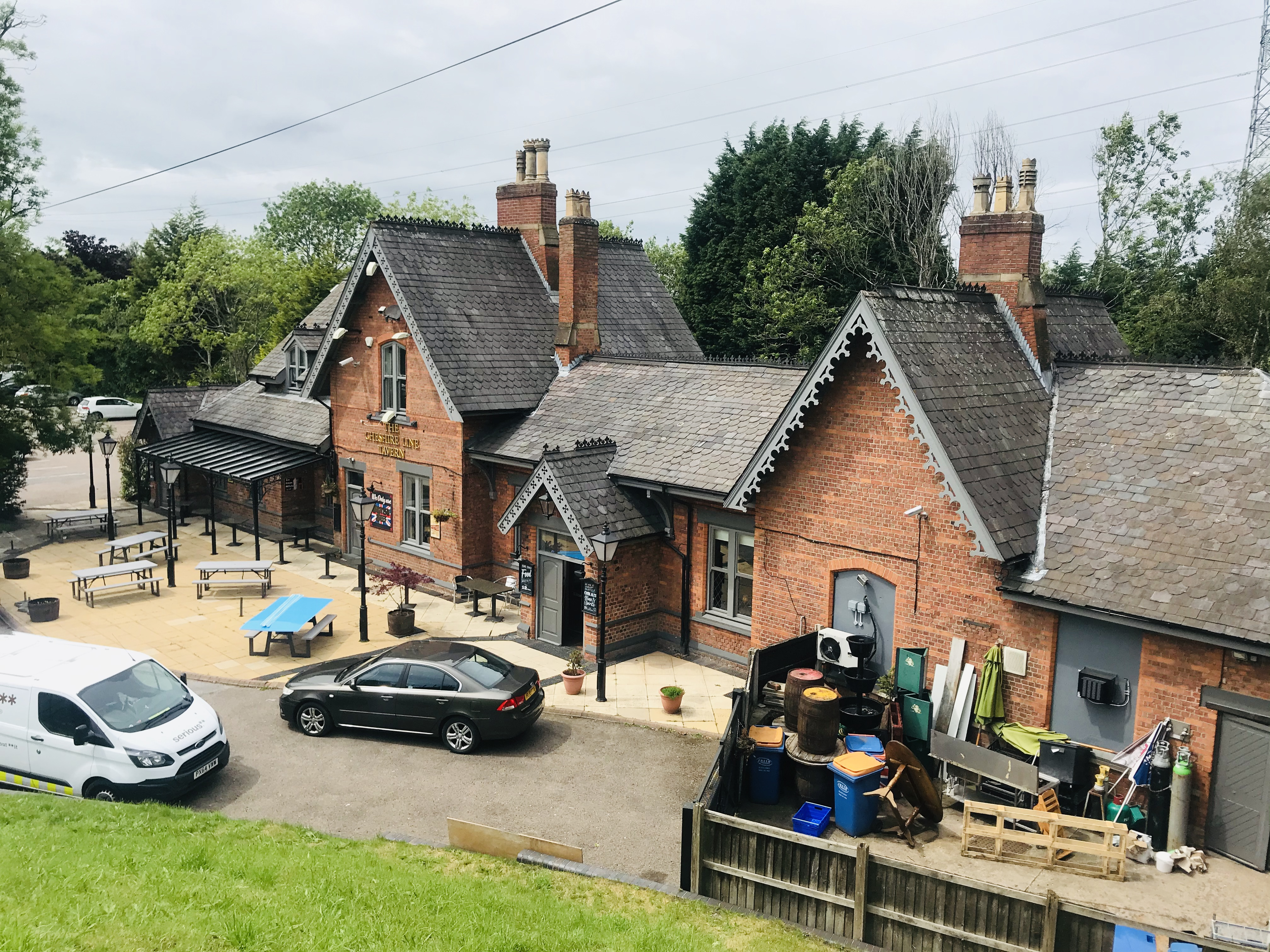
- The former station building, now a public house (2020)

General information
- Location: Cheadle, Stockport; England
- Coordinates: 53.4021°N 2.2181°W
- Grid reference: SJ856894

Other information
- Status: Disused

History
- Original company: Stockport, Timperley and Altrincham Junction Railway
- Pre-grouping: Cheshire Lines Committee
- Post-grouping: Cheshire Lines Committee

Key dates
- 1 February 1866: Station opened as Cheadle
- 1 July 1950: Renamed Cheadle North
- 30 November 1964: Station closed
Location

Cheadle North railway station served the village of Cheadle, Cheshire, England. It was a stop on the Stockport, Timperley and Altrincham Junction Railway and was renamed Cheadle North on 1 July 1950.

== History ==
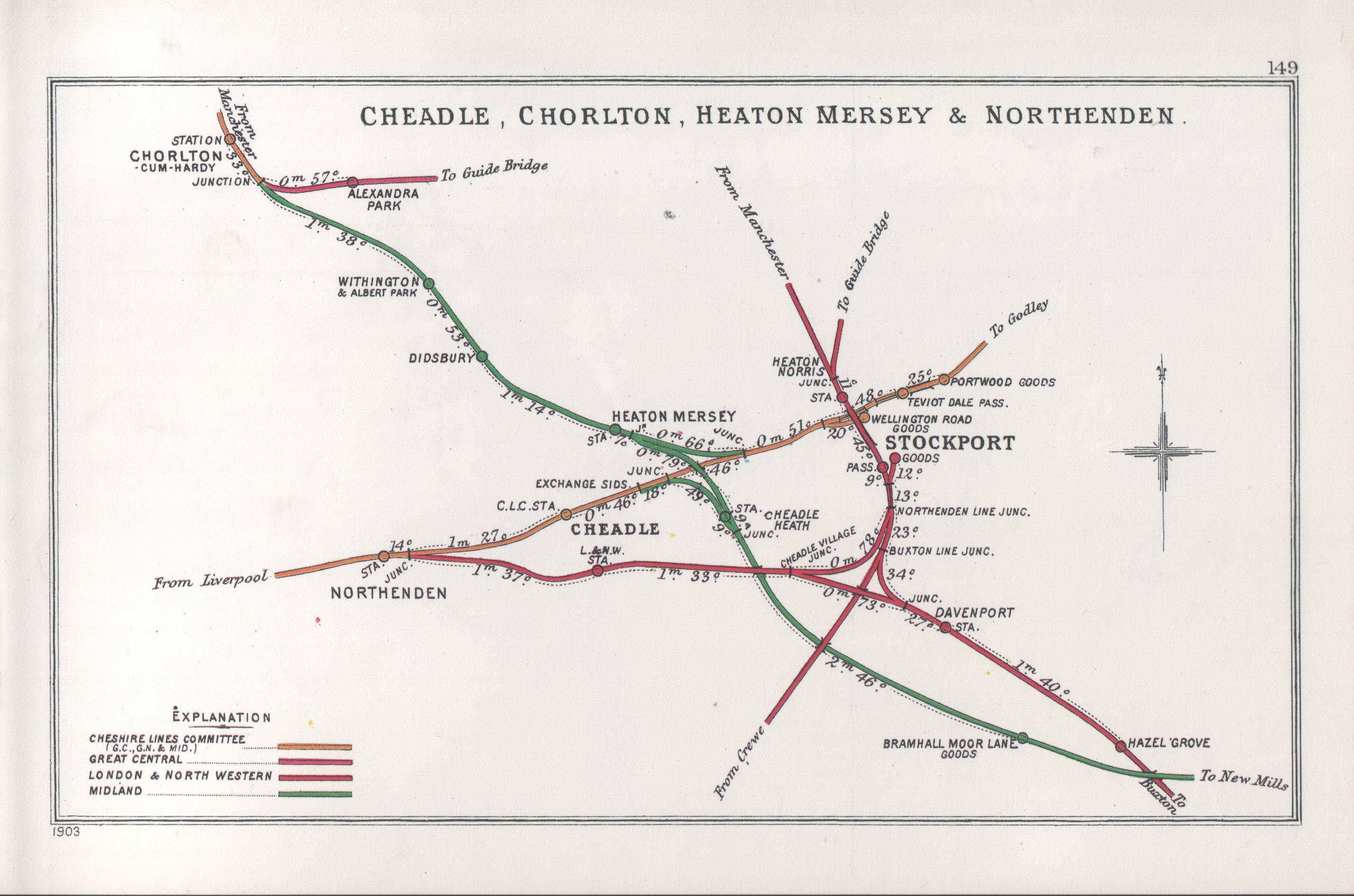
A Railway Clearing House 1903 diagram of railways in south Manchester, showing the location of Cheadle CLC and Cheadle LNW stations

The station was opened on 1 February 1866 by the Stockport, Timperley and Altrincham Junction Railway (ST&AJ). On 15 August 1867, the ST&AJ was merged into the Cheshire Lines Committee (CLC) joint railway. The CLC survived intact at the 1923 UK railway grouping and continued to operate the station until the CLC was absorbed into the nationalised British Railways (BR) on 1 January 1948.

BR continued to operate the station for a further fourteen years until closure of the station, with others on the line, on 30 November 1964 as part of the Beeching Axe.

== Location ==
The station was located 0.5 miles (0.80 km) north of Cheadle at the point where the Manchester Road passes over the line on a bridge. It was situated on the west side of the bridge, with the main buildings being on the south side of the line; these still survive in non-railway use.

== Facilities ==
There was a small brick-built shelter for passengers on the north side of the line. A goods shed and two-line siding was on the line's south side.

== Services ==
The station was served by local passenger trains from Stockport Tiviot Dale to Altrincham, and to Warrington Central and Liverpool Central stations. The weekday westbound passenger service during July 1922 consisted of four trains to Warrington and Liverpool and four trains to Altrincham.

The October 1942 timetable showed the effect of wartime reductions, with three daily weekday passenger trains to Liverpool and one terminating at Glazebrook. In January 1956 the passenger train service remained sparse with just five trains in each direction, with none serving Altrincham.

Preceding station	Disused railways	Following station
Northenden; Line open station closed	Cheshire Lines Committee	Stockport (Tiviot Dale); Line and station closed
Northenden; Line open station closed	Midland Railway	Cheadle Heath; Line and station closed

== Preservation ==
The station buildings were converted into a pub in the 1980s. It was named The Station initially, when it was a Banks Brewery pub and later Chesters Brewery. It is now a free house called the Cheshire Line Tavern. The line through the station was reduced to single track in 1984; it remains open for goods trains.

== See also ==
- Cheadle railway station (disambiguation)
