= Cheadle railway station (disambiguation) =

Cheadle railway station was a former LNWR station in Cheadle, Cheshire (now Greater Manchester) (1866–1917), now under construction to reopen

Cheadle railway station may also refer to:

- Cheadle North railway station, a former Cheshire Lines Committee station in Cheadle, Cheshire (now Greater Manchester) (1866–1964)
- Cheadle railway station (Staffordshire), a station in Cheadle, Staffordshire (1901–1963).
- Cheadle Hulme railway station, on the Crewe to Manchester Piccadilly via Stockport line in Cheadle Hulme, Greater Manchester (opened 1842)
- Cheadle Heath railway station, a former Midland Railway station in Stockport (now Greater Manchester) (1901–1967)

== See also ==
- Cheadle branch line
