= Stockport, Timperley and Altrincham Junction Railway =

Stockport, Timperley and Atrincham Junction Railway
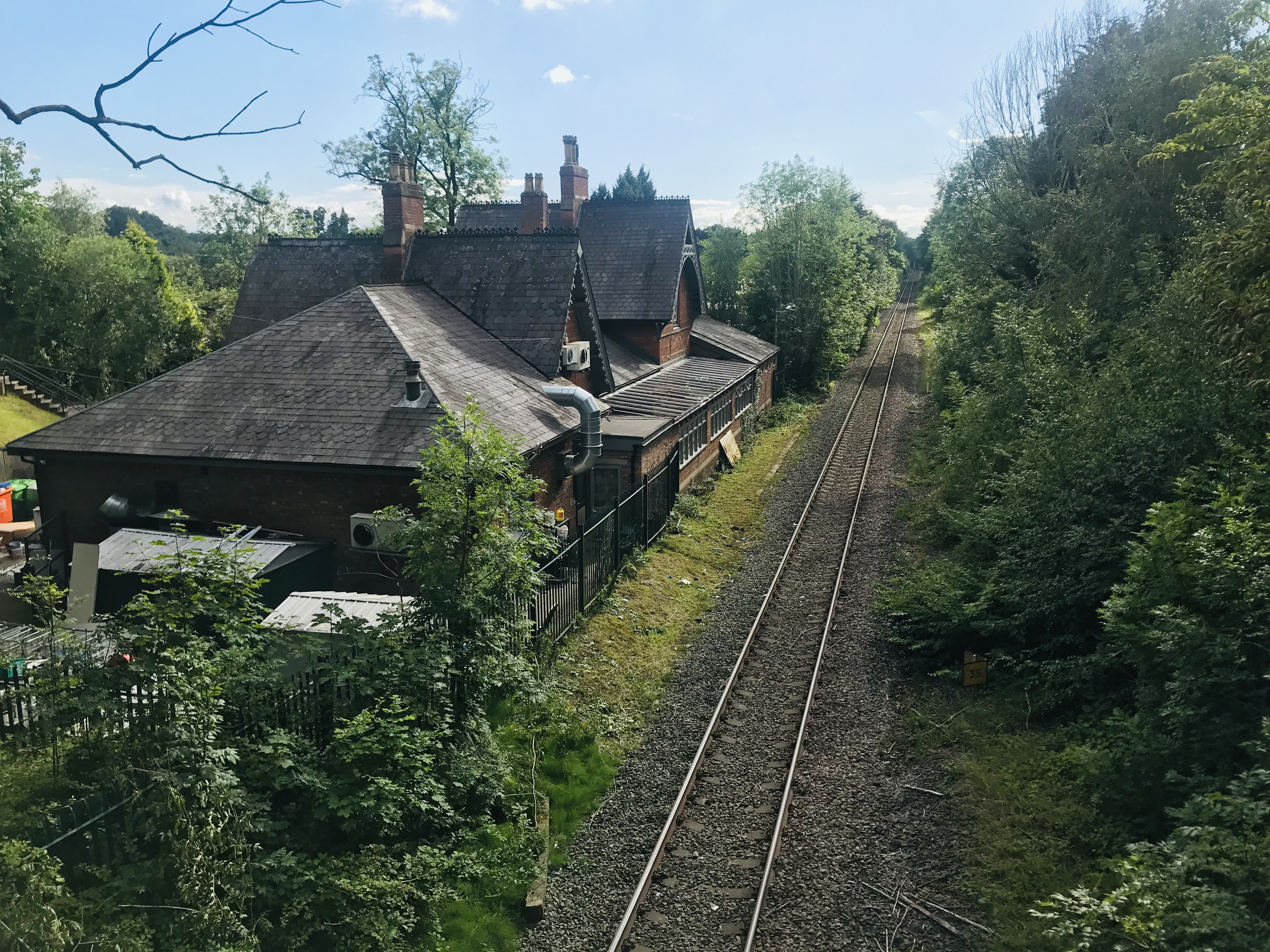
- Westward view of the line passing the former Cheadle station

Overview
- Locale: Cheshire (historically), now Greater Manchester.
- Dates of operation: 1861–1867
- Successor: Cheshire Lines Committee

Technical
- Track gauge: 4 ft 8 1/2 in (1,435 mm) standard gauge
- Length: 8 miles 17 chains (13.2 km)

The Stockport, Timperley and Altrincham Junction Railway (ST&AJR) was authorised by an act of Parliament, passed on 22 July 1861 to build an 8 miles 17 chains (13.2 km) railway from Stockport Portwood to Altrincham.

== History ==
Stockport, Timperley and Altrincham Junction Railway Act 1861
- Act of Parliament
- Parliament of the United Kingdom
- Long title: An Act for incorporating the Stockport, Timperley, and Altrincham Railway Company, and for authorizing them to make and maintain the Stockport, Timperley, and Altrincham Railway; and for other Purposes.
- Citation: 24 & 25 Vict. c. clxxv

Dates
- Royal assent: 22 July 1861

The Stockport, Timperley and Altrincham Junction Railway Act 1861 (24 & 25 Vict. c. clxxv) was for a locally promoted line supported by the Manchester, Sheffield and Lincolnshire Railway (MS&LR) and the Great Northern Railway (GNR).

Together the MSLR and GNR formed a joint committee to operate this railway along with three others that had been authorised but were not yet open. (Note: They were the Stockport and Woodley Junction Railway, the Cheshire Midland Railway and the West Cheshire Railway) Together these railways connected up to provide an alternative route into North Cheshire that avoided Manchester.

Each company was to provide an equal amount of capital and four representatives to the joint management committee. This arrangement was confirmed by the Great Northern Railway (Cheshire Lines) Act 1863 (26 & 27 Vict. c. cxlvii). This act had not, however, formally set up a separate legal body, providing instead for the two companies to manage and work the four railways through their existing structures.

This arrangement eventually led to the formation of the Cheshire Lines Committee in 1865. The line was then formally brought under the direct joint ownership of the MS&LR and GNR in 1865 by the Cheshire Lines Transfer Act 1865 (28 & 29 Vict. c. cccxxvii). This act allowed the Midland Railway to join as an equal partner, which it did in 1866. and finally The Cheshire Lines Committee was authorised by the Cheshire Lines Act 1867 (30 & 31 Vict. c. ccvii) as a fully independent organisation with a board formed from three directors from each of the parent companies.

== Opening ==
The railway from Stockport opened on 1 December 1865 through to Deansgate Junction. The section from Skelton East Junction to Broadheath Junction opened on 1 February 1866 and the final connection from Skelton North Junction to Timperley Junction opened on 1 February 1879.

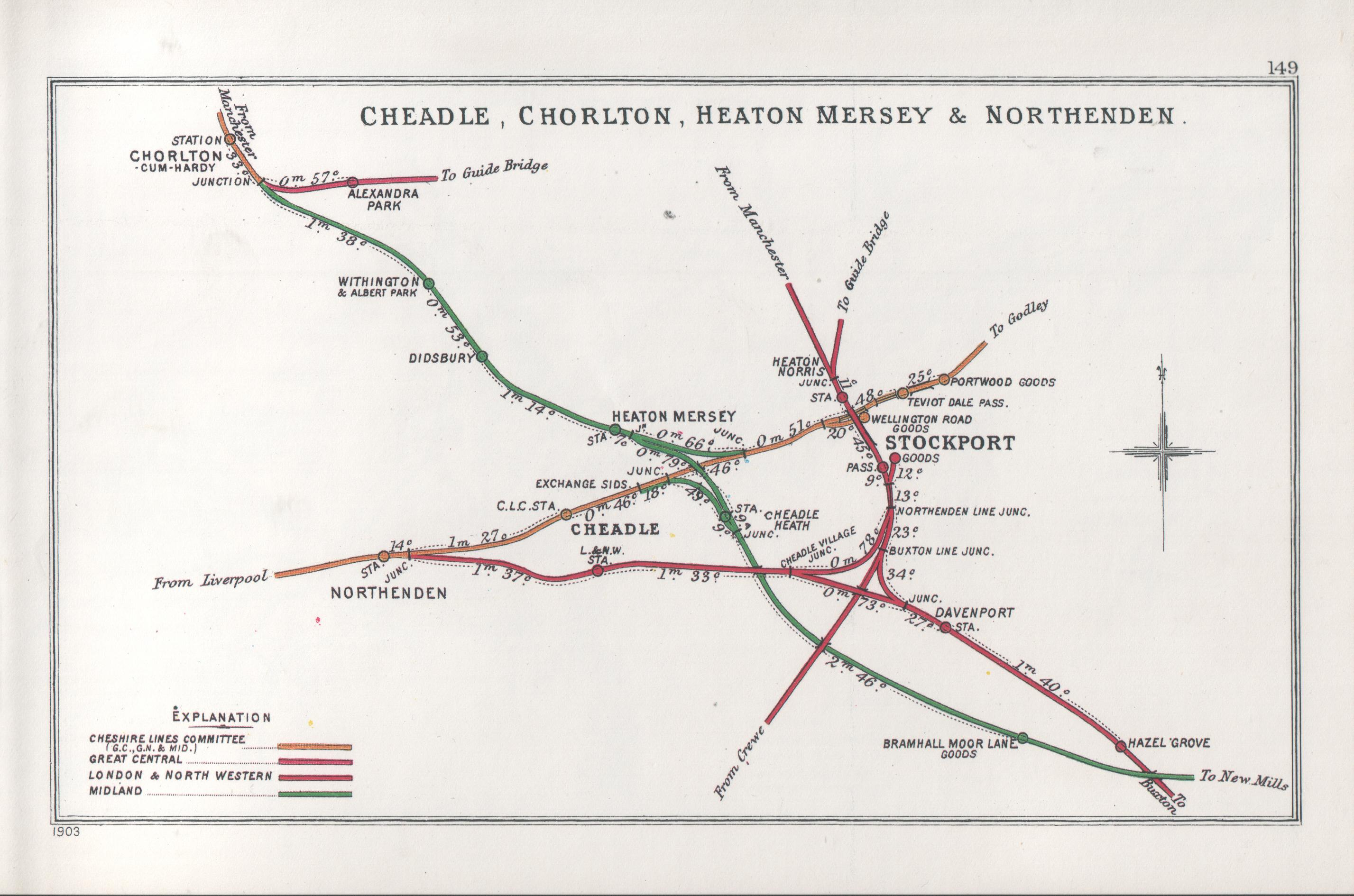
Eastern terminal Junction at Stockport

== Route and stations ==
The railway started at an end-on connection to the western terminus of the Stockport and Woodley Junction Railway at Stockport Portwood station. It ran to three places:

- to connect with the London and North Western Railway (LNWR) (Note: It was with the former Warrington & Stockport Railway's line) at Broadheath Junction, and
- to connect with the Manchester, South Junction and Altrincham Railway (MSJ&AR) at both Timperley Junction and at Altrincham Deansgate Junction.

All three destinations are in the vicinity of Altrincham.

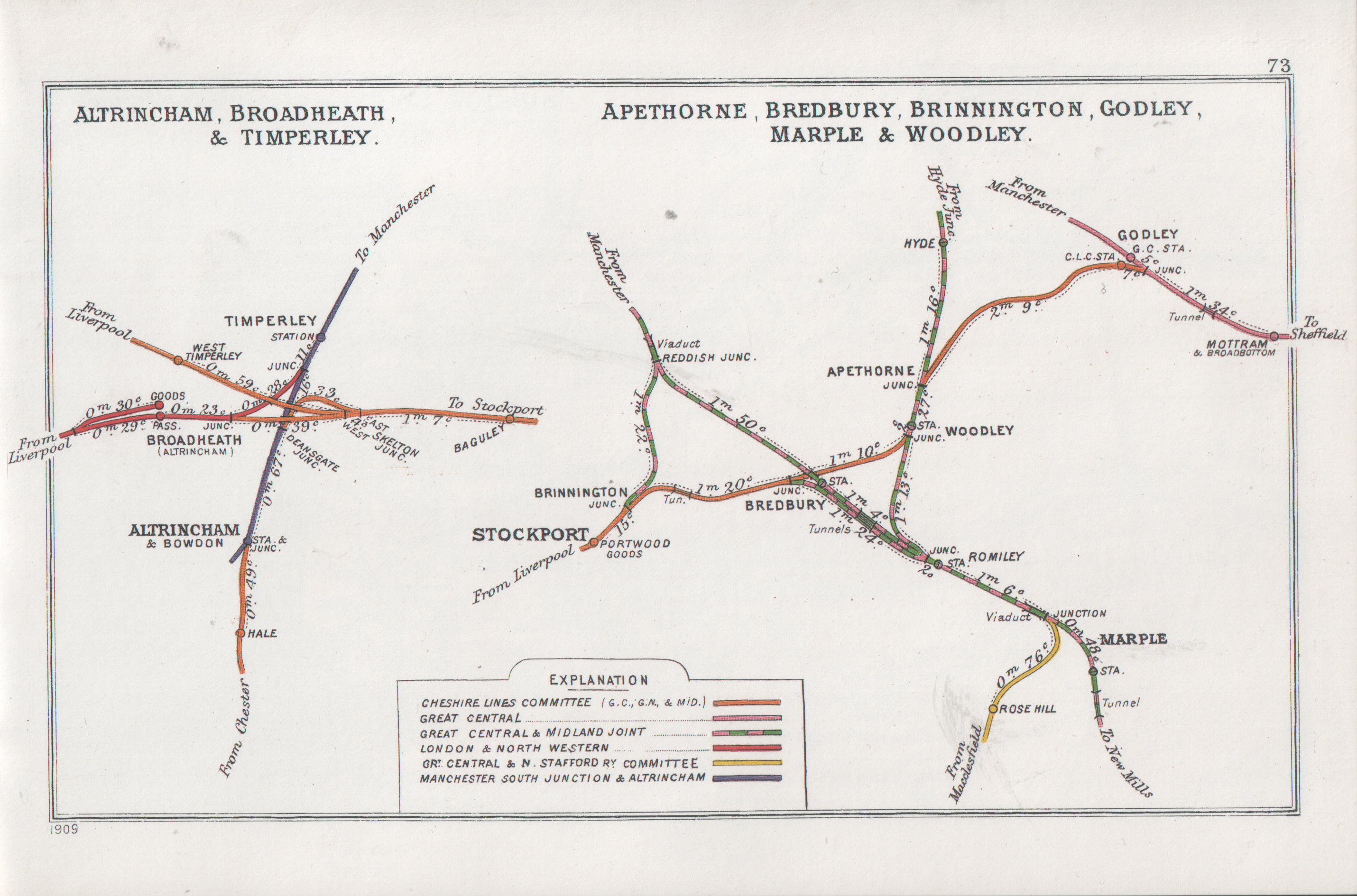
Western terminal Junction at Altrincham

Initial intermediate stations were at:

- Stockport Teviot Dale renamed later to Stockport Tiviot Dale.
- Cheadle.
- Northenden, and
- Baguley.

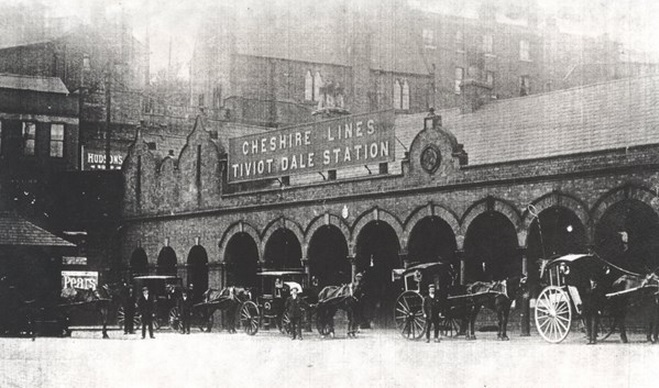
Stockport Tiviot Dale railway station c.1902

Goods facilities were provided at all the stations and in addition there were two goods depots at Stockport, Georges Road and Wellington Road, one each side of the main line. They both opened around 1866, their proximity led to them being considered as one facility, they were treated as the same in the Handbook of Railway Stations. Wellington Road had a 10-ton capacity crane.

The Stockport, Timperley and Altrincham Junction Railway Act 1861 (24 & 25 Vict. c. clxxv) authorised working arrangements between the railway and its two neighbours, the Stockport and Woodley Junction Railway and the Cheshire Midland Railway, the ST&AJR was granted running powers over the MSJ&AR and the LNWR was granted running powers between its two sections of railway at Northenden and Broadheath Junctions.

The ST&AJR served as a very useful avoiding line to the south of Manchester and carried a very heavy freight traffic which funnelled in from several routes from the East Midlands and Yorkshire to south Lancashire and Cheshire. This required hard working of the steam locomotives by their crews to clear the bottleneck stretch of line for the following trains.

== Closures ==
Stockport Tiviot Dale remained in use until closure on 2 January 1967. The other stations all closed on 30 November 1964, when the Stockport Tiviot Dale to Warrington Central service ceased.

== Modern times ==
Though passenger services had all ceased by the late 1960s, the line remained in regular use for goods traffic throughout the following decade, mainly carrying coal traffic from South Yorkshire to Fiddlers Ferry power station and limestone aggregates from the Peak District to the Brunner Mond works near Northwich. In 1980 though, the eastern section of the line from Portwood to Cheadle was temporarily closed to traffic for safety reasons after the Lancashire Hill tunnel near Tiviot Dale sustained roof damage during construction work on the nearby M63 motorway and the traffic using it diverted away.

The closure of the Woodhead Line the following summer removed the main reason for the line's continuing existence and so in 1982 it was formally abandoned and subsequently lifted. The Skelton Junction to Warrington Arpley line which it fed into at its western end also suffered the same fate in July 1985, with infrastructure issues again the reason behind the closure (the deteriorating condition of the Manchester Ship Canal viaduct at Latchford being the cause this time). This left only the sections from Edgeley Junction to Deansgate Junction and Cheadle Heath to Northenden (which connected to the surviving portion of the 1902 Midland line from New Mills to Heaton Mersey) in use.

Passenger trains were re-introduced when Manchester's tram network, Metrolink, took over the direct Manchester to Altrincham line (ex-MSJAR) in 1992. Trains from Manchester to points beyond Altrincham now travel via Stockport over this line which today forms part of the Mid-Cheshire Line. The intermediate stations have not been re-opened, though there have been proposals put forward to reopen Baguley station to act as an interchange with the nearby Baguley Metrolink station on the recently Metrolink line from St Werburgh's Road to Manchester Airport.
