= Stockport and Woodley Junction Railway =

Overview
- Locale: Cheshire
- Dates of operation: 1860–1867
- Successor: Cheshire Lines Committee

Technical
- Track gauge: 4 ft 8 1/2 in (1,435 mm) standard gauge
- Length: 2 miles 61 chains (4.4 km)

The Stockport and Woodley Junction Railway was incorporated on 15 May 1860 to build a 2 miles 61 chains (4.4 km) railway from Stockport Portwood to a junction with the Manchester, Sheffield and Lincolnshire Railway's (MS&LR) authorised Newton and Compstall line at Woodley.

== History ==
Stockport and Woodley Junction Railway Act 1860
- Act of Parliament
- Parliament of the United Kingdom
- Long title: An Act for authorizing the Construction of a Railway from Stockport to Woodley in the County of Chester; and for other Purposes.
- Citation: 23 & 24 Vict. c. xvi

Dates
- Royal assent: 15 May 1860

Text of statute as originally enacted

The Stockport and Woodley Junction Railway Act 1860 (23 & 24 Vict. c. xvi) was promoted by landowners and supported by the Manchester, Sheffield and Lincolnshire Railway (MS&LR) who, along with the Great Northern Railway (GNR) were allowed to subscribe.

Together the MS&LR and GNR formed a joint committee to operate this railway along with three others that had been authorised but were not yet open. (Note: They were the Cheshire Midland Railway, the Stockport, Timperley and Altrincham Junction Railway and the West Cheshire Railway) Together these railways connected up to provide an alternative route into North Cheshire that avoided Manchester.

Each company was to provide an equal amount of capital and four representatives to the joint management committee. This arrangement was confirmed by the Great Northern Railway (Cheshire Lines) Act 1863 (26 & 27 Vict. c. cxlvii). This act had not, however, formally set up a separate legal body, providing instead for the two companies to manage and work the four railways through their existing structures.

This arrangement eventually led to the formation of the Cheshire Lines Committee in 1865. The line was then formally brought under the direct joint ownership of the MS&LR and GNR in 1865 by the Cheshire Lines Transfer Act 1865 (28 & 29 Vict. c. cccxxvii). This act allowed the Midland Railway to join as an equal partner, which it did in 1866. and finally the Cheshire Lines Committee was authorised by the Cheshire Lines Act 1867 (30 & 31 Vict. c. ccvii) as a fully independent organisation with a board formed from three directors from each of the parent companies.

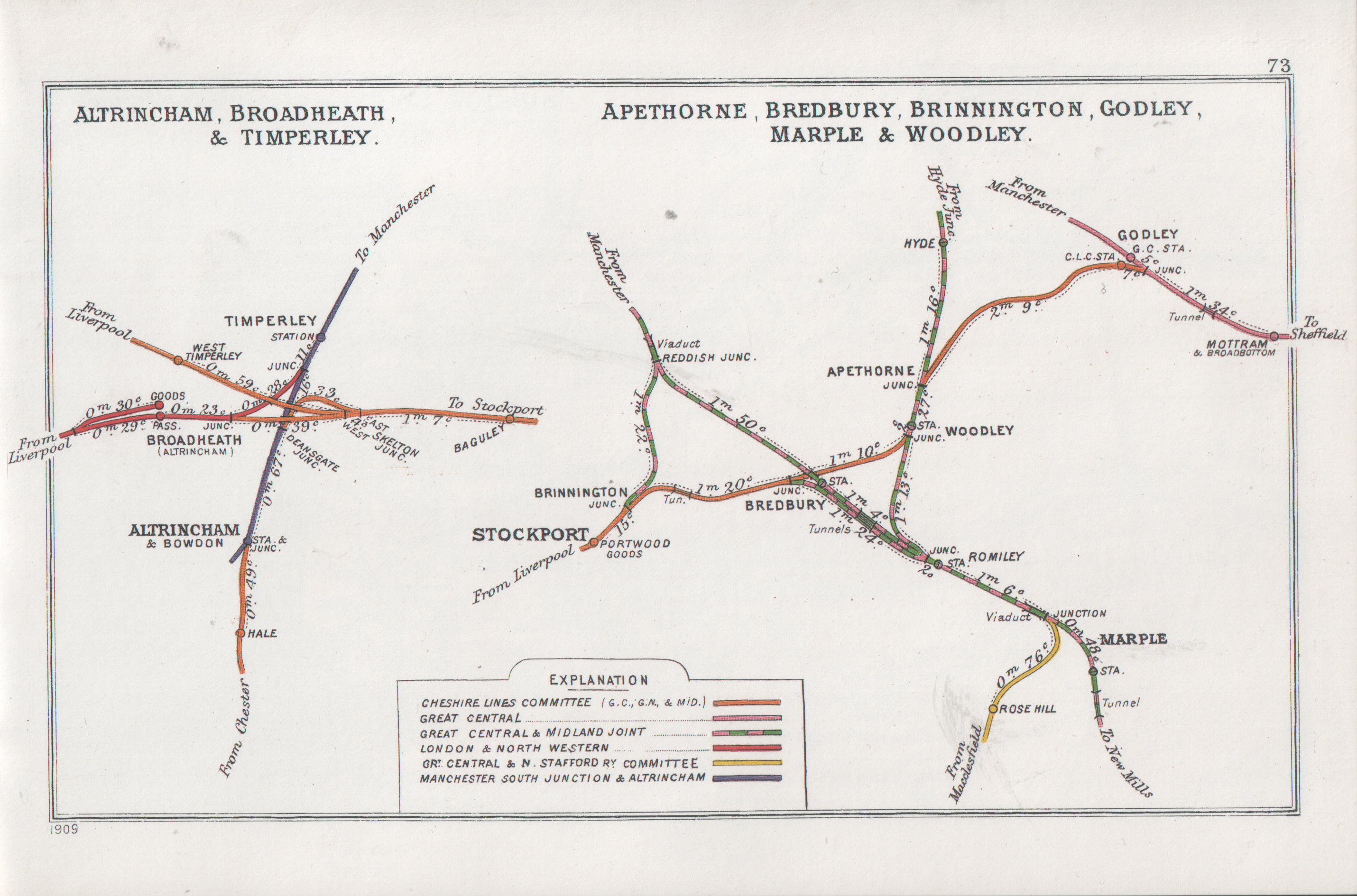
Lines around Woodley junction. Pre-grouping.

== Opening ==
The Stockport and Woodley Junction Railway opened for passenger traffic on 12 January 1863 and for goods traffic in 1865.

== Route and stations ==
The railway terminated at Stockport Portwood which later became an end-on connection to the Stockport, Timperley and Altrincham Junction Railway to the west. There were no other stations. At the other end the line terminated at Woodley Junction, 2 chains (40 m) short of MS&LR's Woodley station.
