= Meadow Mill =

Mill in Stockport, Greater Manchester, England

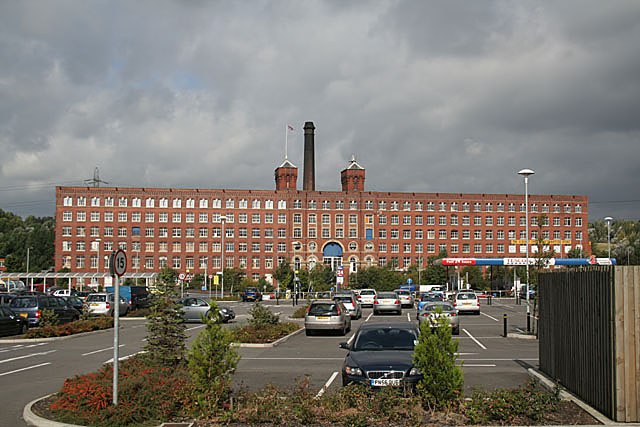
- Meadow Mill from the car park of Tesco in 2007

General information
- Type: Cotton mill
- Location: Water Street, Portwood, Stockport, Greater Manchester, United Kingdom
- Coordinates: 53.4177°N 2.1524°W
- Opened: c.1880
- Renovated: 2021
- Renovation cost: £15 million
- Owner: Majdiah Residence

Technical details
- Floor count: 7

Renovating team
- Architects: Howard & Seddon

Listed Building – Grade II
- Official name: Meadow Mill including the tall wing to the south west
- Designated: 10 March 1975
- Reference no.: 1356846

Meadow Mill is a historic cotton mill in Portwood, Stockport, Greater Manchester, England. It is located on the south bank of the River Tame opposite a Tesco Extra supermarket and the M60 motorway. The seven-storey building was built in c.1880 for the spinning of cotton and wool by T & J Leigh Ltd, designated as a Grade II listed building in 1975, and redeveloped into 200 apartments with a mixed-use ground floor in 2021.

== History ==
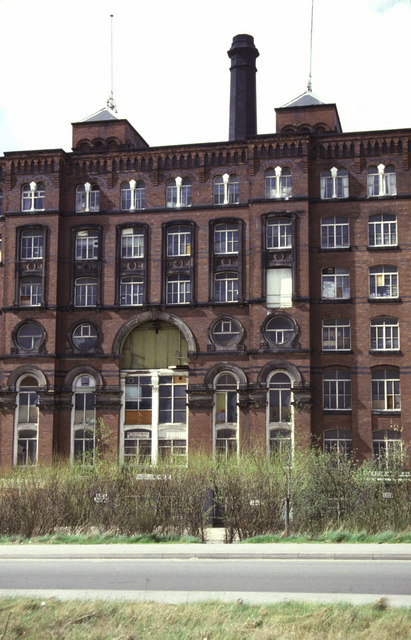
Detail of the central area of this large symmetrical mill during a period of 1980s dereliction

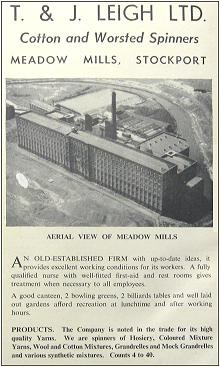
Old newspaper clipping with view of Meadow Mill

Stockport was a major centre of textile manufacture, particularly cotton spinning and hat making from the Industrial Revolution until the 20th century. The cotton and worsted spinners Thomas and James Leigh, who were operating the Beehive and Hope Mills (now replaced by the motorway and Tesco) in Portwood by 1872, constructed Meadow Mill during the 1870s. By 1914, it contained 120,000 spindles. In 1960 the firm of T & J Leigh ceased trading, but a new company continued to spin carpet and worsted yarn until 1969.

On 10 March 1975, the mill was given a Grade II listing by Historic England as a structure of special architectural or historic interest. It was converted into industrial units for multiple businesses, including furniture stores, wood workshops and gyms, but by the 2010s almost half of the giant mill had become unused through lack of demand or because of deteriorating condition. It was sold to the London-based developer William George Homes in 2016 for £2.5 million, and plans drawn up for residential redevelopment, with planning approved by Stockport Council in 2017.

The following year, Majdiah Residence, a company based in Saudi Arabia, bought the mill and began work on the approved conversion and renovation scheme, which includes 213 one-, two- and three-bedroom apartments, as well as 24,000 sq ft (2,200 m^{2}) of leisure and commercial space; a further 2,000 sq ft (190 m^{2}) is allocated for restaurant use. The works were completed by May 2023.

== 2025 flooding ==
In the early hours of 1 January 2025, the River Tame running to the rear of Meadow Mill burst its banks. This caused the car park at the front of the mill and the ground floor of the mill to flood. Around 400 residents were stranded in their apartments without electricity, water or gas while they awaited rescue from the emergency services. The majority of cars in the car park were completely submerged and emergency services used small boats to rescue residents who were taken to a nearby refuge centre.

In the days following the floods, it was reported that residents had been forced to pay for temporary accommodation while their properties were uninhabitable, and some were forced to move back into their apartment despite still being without utilities as they had run out of money. The local authority appealed to the building's insurer, along with the freeholder and management company to expedite remedial works required and communicate with residents in relation to provision of temporary accommodation.

== Description ==
Meadow Mill has a front elevation of seven storeys, including the basement, and a width of 41 bays. It is constructed of red brick, with the basement in blue brick below a stone band. The first and second floors are arcaded. The top floor has paired windows with round arched heads and column mullions, with a stone parapet and brick arcaded bracket cornice above. The more ornamental central four bays have stone dressings to the windows, and outer two slightly protrude; first and second floor arcades have round-headed, stone, carved capitals. The mill's interior structure is cast-iron lengthwise and crosswise beams with brick arches – known as fireproof construction. It is surrounded by a factory chimney to the rear and a single-storey gatehouse. Historic England has called Meadow Mill "a good example of its period".

== See also ==
- List of mills in Stockport
