= Manchester, Sheffield and Lincolnshire Railway =

Former British railway company

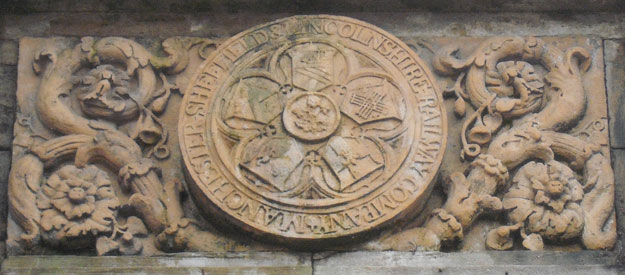
- Type: Private
- Industry: Railway
- Predecessor: Sheffield, Ashton-under-Lyne and Manchester Railway; Sheffield and Lincolnshire Junction Railway; Great Grimsby and Sheffield Junction Railway (Merged)
- Founded: 1847
- Defunct: 1897 (name change)
- Fate: Name change
- Successor: Great Central Railway
- Headquarters: Manchester, England
- Key people: James Joseph Allport; Edward Watkin
- Products: Rail Transport

The Manchester, Sheffield and Lincolnshire Railway (MS&LR) was formed in 1847 when the Sheffield, Ashton-under-Lyne and Manchester Railway joined with authorised but unbuilt railway companies, forming a proposed network from Manchester to Grimsby. It pursued a policy of expanding its area of influence, especially in reaching west to Liverpool, which it ultimately did through the medium of the Cheshire Lines Committee network in joint partnership with the Great Northern Railway (GNR) and the Midland Railway.

Its dominant traffic was minerals, chiefly coal, and the main market was in London and the south of England. It was dependent on other lines to convey traffic southward. The London and North Western Railway (LNWR) was an exceptionally hostile partner, and in later years the MS&LR allied itself with the Great Northern Railway. Passenger traffic, especially around Manchester, was also an important business area, and well-patronised express trains to London were run in collaboration with the GNR. Nevertheless, the MS&LR was never greatly profitable.

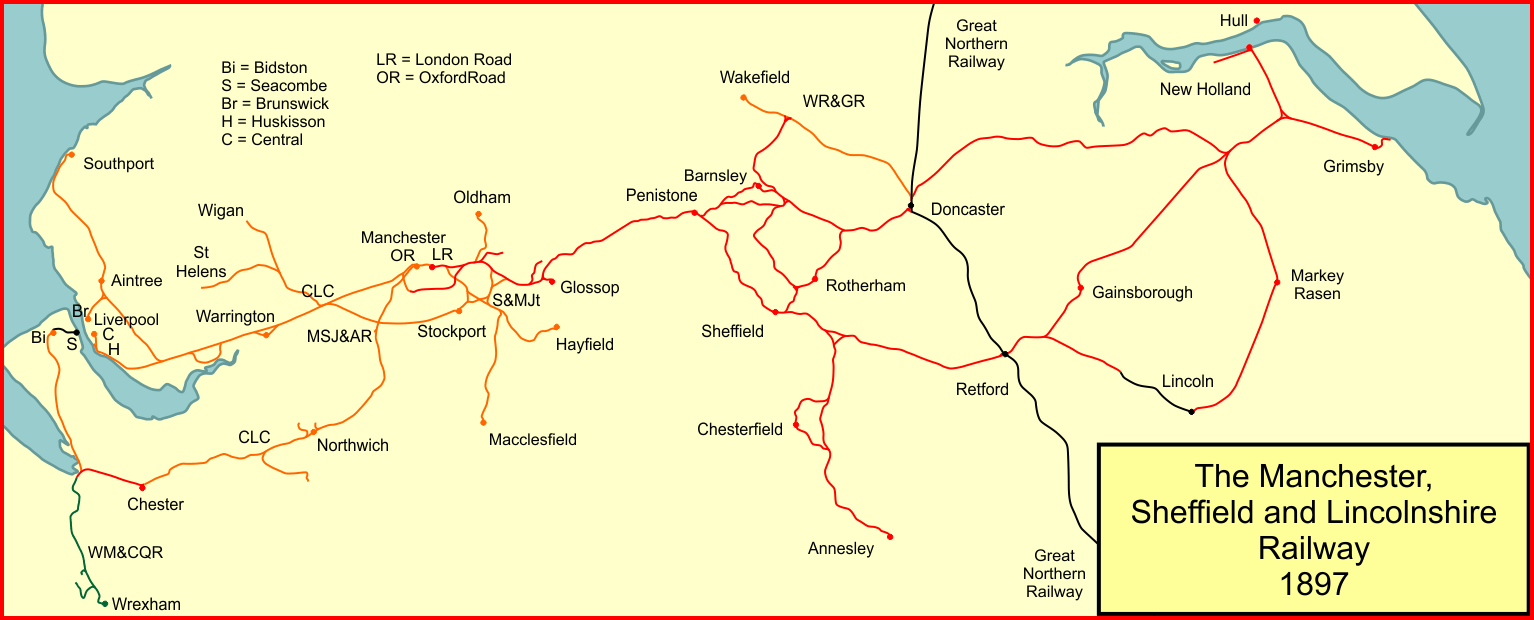
The Manchester, Sheffield and Lincolnshire Railway system in 1897

For many years its general manager, and then chairman, was Edward Watkin, a dynamic leader who sometimes allowed personal vanity to drive his priorities. Watkin was determined that the MS&LR should get its own route to London, and this became the scheme for the London Extension, a fearfully expensive project that risked alienating friendly companies. The London extension scheme changed the character of the MS&LR completely and dominated its final years. In 1897 the company changed its name to "The Great Central Railway", and it was under that company name that the London Extension was opened in 1899.

== Origin ==
The Sheffield, Ashton under Lyne and Manchester Railway (SA&MR) had opened throughout on 23 December 1845. Its line ran through the Woodhead Tunnel, a little over 3 miles in length. The line connected with the Manchester and Birmingham Railway at its western end, and had a basic terminus in Sheffield at Bridgehouses. There was a branch from Dinting to Glossop, and another from Guide Bridge to Stalybridge. The SA&MR had been short of money during construction, and the Woodhead Tunnel was built as a single track to save money.

Manchester, Sheffield and Lincolnshire Railway Act 1846
- Act of Parliament
- Parliament of the United Kingdom
- Long title: An Act to amalgamate the Sheffield, Ashton-under-Lyne and Manchester Railway Company, the Sheffield and Lincolnshire Junction, the Sheffield and Lincolnshire Extension, and the Great Grimsby and Sheffield Railway Companies, and the Grimsby Dock Company.
- Citation: 9 & 10 Vict. c. cclxviii

Dates
- Royal assent: 27 July 1846
Other legislation
Repealed by	Manchester, Sheffield and Lincolnshire Railway Act 1849

Status: Repealed

Sheffield and Lincolnshire Extension Railway Act 1846
- Act of Parliament
- Parliament of the United Kingdom
- Long title: An Act for making a Railway from the proposed Sheffield and Lincolnshire Junction Railway to the City of Lincoln.
- Citation: 9 & 10 Vict. c. cccxix

Dates
- Royal assent: 3 August 1846
Other legislation
Repealed by	Manchester, Sheffield and Lincolnshire Railway Act 1849

Status: Repealed

As the Railway Mania took hold, it became evident that enlargement of the network dominated by a railway company was key to competitive survival, and in 1846 the SA&MR had been authorised, by the Manchester, Sheffield and Lincolnshire Railway Act 1846 (9 & 10 Vict. c. cclxviii) of 27 July 1846, to amalgamate with three as-yet unbuilt railways: they were:

- The Great Grimsby and Sheffield Junction Railway had been authorised by the Great Grimsby and Sheffield Junction Railway Act 1845 (8 & 9 Vict. c. l) of 30 June 1845 to build from Gainsborough to Grimsby. At Gainsborough it was to connect with the proposed Sheffield and Lincolnshire Junction Railway, and this justified the word "Sheffield" in its title. A further act of Parliament, the Great Grimsby and Sheffield Junction Railway (Lincoln Extension) Act 1846 (9 & 10 Vict. c. xcix) of 26 June 1846 authorised a branch from Wrawby South Junction at Barnetby down to Lincoln, and an extension from there to Newark, on the Great Northern Railway; and in addition a branch to Barton-on-Humber from Brocklesby and a branch to Cleethorpes from Grimsby.
- The Sheffield and Lincolnshire Junction Railway was authorised by the Sheffield and Lincolnshire Junction Railway Act 1846 (9 & 10 Vict. c. ccciv) of 3 August 1846 to build from Sheffield to Gainsborough.
- The Sheffield and Lincolnshire Extension Railway was also authorised by the Sheffield and Lincolnshire Extension Railway Act 1846 (9 & 10 Vict. c. cccxix) on 3 August 1846, connect with the S&LJR at Clarborough Junction, east of Retford, and to run south-east to Sykes Junction, north of Lincoln, where it joined the Great Northern Railway and ran by running powers into Lincoln.

The amalgamation took effect on 1 January 1847, and the combined company was named the Manchester, Sheffield and Lincolnshire Railway. It had headquarters at Manchester London Road station. The first board meeting of the amalgamated company took place on 6 January 1847.

== Canals ==
As well as the railway interest, the new MS&LR acquired a considerable canal network. The Sheffield, Ashton under Lyne and Manchester Railway had acquired three canals in March 1846; they were

- the Ashton Canal (connecting Manchester, Ashton, Stalybridge and Stockport);
- the Peak Forest Canal, which ran from Ashton to Whaley Bridge, and which had a plateway extension to Dove Holes; and
- the Macclesfield Canal, which left the Peak Forest Canal at Marple and had a long southward main line through Macclesfield and Congleton to join the Trent and Mersey Canal.

These canals cost the company £33,608 annually in guaranteed payments to the original proprietors.

The Sheffield and Lincolnshire Junction Railway had already purchased the Sheffield Canal and it was vested in the MS&LR on 22 July 1848 by the Sheffield Canal Purchase Act 1848 (11 & 12 Vict. c. xciv), and the MS&LR acquired the Chesterfield Canal on 9 July 1847.

== First years 1847–1849 ==
Manchester, Sheffield and Lincolnshire Railway (Bugsworth Branch and Amendment of Acts) Act 1847
- Act of Parliament
- Parliament of the United Kingdom
- Long title: An Act for enabling the Manchester, Sheffield, and Lincolnshire Railway Company to make a Railway at Bugsworth, and for amending the Acts relating thereto.
- Citation: 10 & 11 Vict. c. cxvi

Dates
- Royal assent: 2 July 1847
Other legislation
Repealed by	Manchester, Sheffield and Lincolnshire Railway Act 1849

Status: Repealed

Text of statute as originally enacted

Manchester, Sheffield and Lincolnshire Railways (Thurgoland Coal Branch) Act 1847
- Act of Parliament
- Parliament of the United Kingdom
- Long title: An Act for enabling the Manchester, Sheffield, and Lincolnshire Railway Company to make a Coal Branch from their Thurgoland Station to the Township of Stainborough.
- Citation: 10 & 11 Vict. c. clxv

Dates
- Royal assent: 9 July 1847
Other legislation
Repealed by	Manchester, Sheffield and Lincolnshire Railway Act 1849

Status: Repealed

Text of statute as originally enacted

Manchester, Sheffield and Lincolnshire Railway (Barnsley Junction and Branches) Act 1848
- Act of Parliament
- Parliament of the United Kingdom
- Long title: An Act for enabling the Manchester, Sheffield, and Lincolnshire Railway Company to make a Railway to Barnsley, with Branches therefrom, all in the West Riding of the County of York.
- Citation: 11 & 12 Vict. c. lxiii

Dates
- Royal assent: 22 July 1848
Other legislation
Repealed by	Manchester, Sheffield and Lincolnshire Railway Act 1849

Status: Repealed

Text of statute as originally enacted

Manchester, Sheffield and Lincolnshire Railway (Station Approach at Manchester) Act 1848
- Act of Parliament
- Parliament of the United Kingdom
- Long title: An Act for enabling the Manchester, Sheffield, and Lincolnshire Railway Company to make improved Communications to their Station in Manchester.
- Citation: 11 & 12 Vict. c. lxiv

Dates
- Royal assent: 22 July 1848
Other legislation
Repealed by	Manchester, Sheffield and Lincolnshire Railway Act 1849

Status: Repealed

Text of statute as originally enacted

Manchester, Sheffield and Lincolnshire (Railway Crossing of Sheffield Street, &c.) Act 1848
- Act of Parliament
- Parliament of the United Kingdom
- Long title: An Act to enable the Manchester, Sheffield, and Lincolnshire Railway Company to carry the Line of their Railway across Sheffield Street in Manchester, to increase their Station Accommodation at Manchester and Stalybridge; and for other Purposes.
- Citation: 11 & 12 Vict. c. lxix
- Territorial extent: United Kingdom

Dates
- Royal assent: 22 July 1848
Other legislation
Repealed by	Manchester, Sheffield and Lincolnshire Railway Act 1849

Text of statute as originally enacted

Manchester, Sheffield and Lincolnshire Railway Act 1848
- Act of Parliament
- Parliament of the United Kingdom
- Long title: An Act for vesting in the Manchester, Sheffield, and Lincolnshire Railway Company the Canal Navigation from Manchester to or near Ashton-under-Lyne and Oldham.
- Citation: 11 & 12 Vict. c. lxxxvi
- Territorial extent: United Kingdom

Dates
- Royal assent: 22 July 1848
Other legislation
Amends	Manchester and Oldham Canal Act 1792; Manchester and Stockport Canal Act 1793; Ashton Canal Act 1798

Text of statute as originally enacted

Manchester, Sheffield and Lincolnshire Railway (Humber Ferries Improvement) Act 1848
- Act of Parliament
- Parliament of the United Kingdom
- Long title: An Act for improving the Steam Communication across the River Humber belonging to the Manchester, Sheffield, and Lincolnshire Railway Company; for erecting a Pier at Kingston-upon-Hull, and enlarging the Works at New Holland; for making a connecting Line near Habrough in the County of Lincoln; for regulating the Pilotage of the Port of Great Grimsby; and for amending the Acts relating to the Manchester, Sheffield, and Lincolnshire Railway Company.
- Citation: 11 & 12 Vict. c. xcii
- Territorial extent: United Kingdom

Dates
- Royal assent: 22 July 1848
Other legislation
Repealed by	Manchester, Sheffield and Lincolnshire Railway Act 1849

Status: Repealed

Text of statute as originally enacted

Manchester, Sheffield and Lincolnshire Railway (Station at Sheffield and Branch to Sheffield Canal) Act 1848
- Act of Parliament
- Parliament of the United Kingdom
- Long title: An Act to enable the Manchester, Sheffield, and Lincolnshire Railway Company to construct an additional or enlarged Station at Sheffield, and to make a Branch Railway to the Sheffield Canal.
- Citation: 11 & 12 Vict. c. xciii

Dates
- Royal assent: 22 July 1848
Other legislation
Repealed by	Manchester, Sheffield and Lincolnshire Railway Act 1849

Status: Repealed

Text of statute as originally enacted

Manchester, Sheffield and Lincolnshire Railway Act 1849
- Act of Parliament
- Parliament of the United Kingdom
- Long title: An Act to consolidate into One Act and to amend the Provisions of the several Railway and Dock Acts relating to the Manchester, Sheffield, and Lincolnshire Railway Company, and to amend their Canal Acts.
- Citation: 12 & 13 Vict. c. lxxxi
- Territorial extent: United Kingdom

Dates
- Royal assent: 1 August 1849
- Commencement: 1 August 1849 (Note: Section 1.)
Other legislation
Amends	Manchester and Oldham Canal Act 1792; Peak Forest Canal Act 1794
Repeals/revokes	Great Grimsby (Lincoln) Harbour Act 1796; Sheffield, Ashton-under-Lyne and Manchester Railway Act 1837; Sheffield, Ashton-under-Lyne and Manchester Railway Act 1842; Sheffield, Ashton-under-Lyne and Manchester Railway Act 1843; Sheffield, Ashton-under-Lyne and Manchester Railway (Ashton-under-Lyne and Stalybridge Branch) Act 1844; Great Grimsby and Sheffield Junction Railway Act 1845; Grimsby Docks Act 1845; Great Grimsby and Sheffield Junction Railway (Branch to Caistor) Act 1846; Great Grimsby and Sheffield Junction Railway (Lincoln Extension) Act 1846; Great Grimsby and Sheffield Junction Railway (Newark Extension) Act 1846; Great Grimsby and Sheffield Junction Railway (Humber Ferry) Act 1846; Sheffield, Ashton-under-Lyne and Manchester Railway (Whaley Bridge and Hayfield Branches) Act 1846; Manchester, Sheffield and Lincolnshire Railway Act 1846; Sheffield and Lincolnshire Junction Railway Act 1846; Sheffield and Lincolnshire Extension Railway Act 1846; Manchester and Lincoln Union Railway and Chesterfield and Gainsborough Canal Act 1846; Manchester, Sheffield and Lincolnshire Railway (Bugsworth Branch and Amendment of Acts) Act 1847; Manchester, Sheffield and Lincolnshire Railways (Thurgoland Coal Branch) Act 1847; Manchester, Sheffield and Lincolnshire Railways, and Manchester and Lincoln Union Railway and Chesterfield and Gainsborough Canal Amalgamation Act 1847; Manchester, Sheffield and Lincolnshire Railway (Barnsley Junction and Branches) Act 1848; Manchester, Sheffield and Lincolnshire Railway (Station Approach at Manchester) Act 1848; Manchester, Sheffield and Lincolnshire (Railway Crossing of Sheffield Street, &c.) Act 1848; Manchester, Sheffield and Lincolnshire Railway (Humber Ferries Improvement) Act 1848; Manchester, Sheffield and Lincolnshire Railway (Station at Sheffield and Branch to Sheffield Canal) Act 1848

Text of statute as originally enacted

In 1847 the railway network of the MS&LR consisted of nothing more than the network of the SA&MR, with one small addition. On the first day of 1847 a short spur connection was opened from the Sheffield terminal to the Sheffield station of the Midland Railway (former Sheffield and Rotherham Railway). At this time the Midland approached from the Rotherham direction only, and it had a terminal station adjacent to Wicker, and named after that thoroughfare. The short connecting link was steeply graded and almost entirely in tunnel; it was only used for wagon exchange purposes.

Having now taken over three large railway schemes that were authorised but not yet started, the MS&LR had to let large contracts for construction. In February 1847 nearly half a million pounds worth of work was commissioned; the Sheffield and Lincolnshire Junction Railway main line from Woodhouse (near Sheffield) to Gainsborough, the Grimsby line to Market Rasen, and a second bore of the Woodhead Tunnel. The eastward construction from the Bridgehouses terminus across Sheffield was started in May 1847.

The MS&LR soon ran short of money, and a loan of £250,000 had to be negotiated; deliveries of locomotives were slowed, as were certain infrastructure improvements; the stations at Dog Lane, Hazlehead, Oxspring and Thurgoland were closed to passenger traffic as from 1 November 1847. One new station was provided, at Dinting, at the Glossop branch junction. The original Dinting station was closed after an interval. In its first year of operation, the MS&LR had paid a 5% dividend on ordinary stock. This fell to 2 1/2% for the first half of 1848, since when there were no further payments for six years.

Progress continued on building the line between Grimsby and New Holland. The Grimsby-Louth line of the East Lincolnshire Railway (now leased to the Great Northern Railway) was nearing completion too, and both lines opened on 1 March 1848. There was a through train service between New Holland and Louth, operated equally by both companies. A pier 1,500 feet (460 m) in length had been provided at New Holland, which was the terminal of a ferry service to Hull. It was promised that "the rails of the New Holland line will be continued to the extremity of the pier".

Next opening was from a junction at Ulceby (about halfway between New Holland and Grimsby) to Brigg, and a second arm of that line to Market Rasen. These sections opened on 1 November 1848.

Notwithstanding the difficult financial conditions, the MS&LR network as originally planned was completed during 1849, except for the new station at Sheffield (still under construction), the Leverton branch (as the Sheffield and Lincolnshire Extension Railway was now called) and certain dock works at Grimsby. There was an impressive succession of openings: the Barnetby-Lincoln line was opened on 1 February 1849, and the section from Sheffield to Beighton, where a junction was made with the Midland Railway, was opened on 12 February 1849. (Note: A locomotive and two carriages had traversed it on 16 December 1848.) MS&LR passenger trains ran through to Eckington on the Midland Railway from Beighton. A triangular junction was formed at New Holland, leading to a branch to Barton on Humber, opened on 1 March 1849. On 2 April 1849 the section between Brigg and Gainsborough was opened. There was a triangular junction at Ulceby: the eastern side of the triangle had been in use since before July 1848.

The final link, from Woodhouse junction, on the Sheffield-Beighton junction section, to Gainsborough, was formally opened on 16 July 1849. A special train conveying the Directors ran from Liverpool to Grimsby in five hours. The line was opened to the public the following day, 17 July 1849.

There were two stations at Stalybridge: the former SA&MR station and one belonging to the Lancashire and Yorkshire Railway (L&YR). The companies agreed to rationalise, with the MS&LR station handling all passenger business, and the L&YR all the goods business. The necessary junctions between the two routes at Stalybridge were ready on 1 July 1849, and on 1 August two new junctions with the London and North Western Railway (LNWR) were brought into use as well, end-on at Stalybridge with the new line from Huddersfield, and at Guide Bridge station, with the line from Heaton Norris.

At the end of 1849, the MS&LR network amounted to 159 miles, with an additional 110 miles of canal.

== Manchester South Junction and Altrincham Railway ==
The Manchester South Junction and Altrincham Junction Railway (MSJ&AR) had originally been conceived to connect the Sheffield, Ashton under Lyne and Manchester Railway and the Liverpool and Manchester Railway. The Manchester and Birmingham Railway (M&BR) would benefit too from the connection. It was authorised on 21 July 1845 as an independent private company, with three shareholders: the SA&MR, the M&BR and the Earl of Ellesmere. His share was bought out in 1847 and the two railway companies had merged into the Manchester, Sheffield and Lincolnshire Railway and the London and North Western Railway respectively, so that the MSJ&AR was wholly and equally owned by the MS&LR and the LNWR. The line was to be in two parts. The South Junction part was to connect the London Road station of the LNWR (used by the MS&LR) with the former Liverpool and Manchester Railway (now LNWR) at Ordsall Lane. This connected the hitherto separate networks east and west of Manchester. The other part was the seven-mile line to Altrincham.

The line opened between Oxford Road, Manchester, and Altrincham on 20 July 1849, and it was extended back to London Road in July 1849, and from Altrincham to Bowdon in August 1849, or September 1849.

The MSJ&AR network was now complete. As well as enabling a busy local passenger service, in time the MSJ&AR line formed a strategic link, later enabling the MS&LR to pass Manchester and penetrate westwards.

== James Allport ==
In May 1849, George Hudson, the so-called Railway King, had fallen from power as his underhand methods were exposed. The politics of the large railway companies shifted considerably, as Hudson's successors, particularly Captain Mark Huish of the London and North Western Railway (LNWR), engaged in schemes to gain advantage over neighbouring lines. The MS&LR directors saw that it was no longer practicable to control their company's day-to-day activities from the board, and the decided to appoint a general manager. The board selected James Joseph Allport, appointed at a salary of £1,200 a year. Due to existing commitments he was not able to take up the post until 1 January 1850. Allport's appointment at what seemed to some to be a high salary caused some shareholder disquiet.

== The Great Northern Railway ==
Great Northern Railway (Communication with Manchester, Sheffield, and Lincolnshire Railway) Act 1851
- Act of Parliament
- Parliament of the United Kingdom
- Long title: An Act to enable the Great Northern Railway Company to construct Works in connexion with the Manchester, Sheffield, and Lincolnshire Railway; and to facilitate the Use of that Railway by the Company; and for other Purposes.
- Citation: 14 & 15 Vict. c. cxiv

Dates
- Royal assent: 24 July 1851

The Great Northern Railway was building its main line in stages, and on 4 September 1849 it opened its Doncaster-Retford line. At Retford the GNR trains used the MS&LR station until its own station there was opened. This took place on 1 August 1852 after completion of the Retford-Peterborough section of the GNR main line, which crossed that of the MS&LR on the flat. An act of Parliament of 24 July 1851, the Great Northern Railway (Communication with Manchester, Sheffield, and Lincolnshire Railway) Act 1851 (14 & 15 Vict. c. cxiv), permitted the GNR to run over the MS&LR to cross the River Trent at Gainsborough, and also to enter the eastern end of the Great Northern Railway station at Lincoln by means of a spur from Durham Ox Junction, on the line from Market Rasen. On 1 July 1859 the MS&LR brought into use the Whisker Hill curve at Retford, which enabled its passenger trains to use the Great Northern station: the MS&LR Retford station closed on the same date.

== The Euston Square Confederacy ==
Mark Huish had taken over at the LNWR; he was a master of commercial chicanery. He achieved domination of the Midland Railway and the Lancashire and Yorkshire Railway by means of traffic pooling agreements, and the alliance became known as the Euston Square Confederacy. There were good relations between the Great Northern Railway and the MS&LR, and Huish saw that completion of the GNR line from Peterborough to Doncaster, connecting with the MS&LR at Retford, as well as the Gainsborough connection, would encourage a co-operation that would abstract traffic from his allies. He manipulated Allport and the MS&LR into joining a traffic agreement that contained clauses hostile to any collaboration with the GNR; this was approved on 16 January 1850.

== Improvements 1850 to 1852 ==
Manchester, Sheffield and Lincolnshire Railway Act 1850
- Act of Parliament
- Parliament of the United Kingdom
- Long title: An Act to make better Provision for raising Funds to complete the Railway and Dock Undertakings of the Manchester, Sheffield, and Lincolnshire Railway Company, and for other Purposes.
- Citation: 13 & 14 Vict. c. xciv

Dates
- Royal assent: 5 August 1850

Text of statute as originally enacted

Manchester, Sheffield and Lincolnshire Railway Coal Branches Act 1852
- Act of Parliament
- Parliament of the United Kingdom
- Long title: An Act to enable the Manchester, Sheffield, and Lincolnshire Railway Company to construct certain Branch Railways.
- Citation: 15 & 16 Vict. c. cxliv

Dates
- Royal assent: 30 June 1852

Text of statute as originally enacted

Manchester, Sheffield and Lincolnshire Railway (No. 1) Act 1852
- Act of Parliament
- Parliament of the United Kingdom
- Long title: An Act to empower the Manchester, Sheffield, and Lincolnshire Railway Company to raise a further Sum of Money; and to amend the Acts relating to the said Company.
- Citation: 15 & 16 Vict. c. lxxxiii

Dates
- Royal assent: 17 June 1852

Text of statute as originally enacted

The Lancashire and Yorkshire Railway opened a line from Huddersfield to Penistone on 1 July 1850; MS&LR passenger trains began to run over it into Huddersfield.

The Leverton line, leading towards Lincoln, was opened on 7 August 1850, forming a shortened route between Retford and Lincoln. It was supposed to enable MS&LR trains to run through to Lincoln over the GNR, and in return for the GNR to reach Sheffield; however because of its traffic agreement with the LNWR, the MS&LR felt obliged to try to frustrate the arrangement.

At the end of May 1851 a contract was concluded with the Electric Telegraph Company which, for about £5 per mile per annum, undertook to install lines between Manchester, Sheffield, New Holland, Grimsby and Lincoln, providing not only the equipment but the clerks to operate it at the principal stations.

In July 1851 through carriages by three trains a day were introduced between Sheffield (Bridgehouses) and London (Euston Square) via Beighton, Eckington, the Midland Railway, and the LNWR.

A considerable step forward was taken when the new Sheffield station (in due course named "Victoria") was opened on 15 September 1851. It was very commodious; the Bridgehouses station was converted to a goods depot.

The second bore of the Woodhead tunnel opened for traffic on 2 February 1852; its beneficial effect on train operating was felt immediately, and the removal of the pilot engine alone saved £800 a year.

On 18 March 1852 a banquet was held at Grimsby to celebrate the completion of the MS&LR's dock; it entered public use in May and a branch from Grimsby Town station to the Docks and Pier stations, with two miles of internal dock lines, were ready on 1 August 1853.

The Etherow and Dinting Vale viaducts on the original SA&MR line had both been strengthened with extra tie rods in the middle 1850s. They were insured respectively for £4,000 and £6,000, but now drastic repairs were required: all of the timber arches in both structures were to be replaced by wrought iron girders at a cost of £28,700 from November 1859. Not long afterwards the contractor system of permanent way maintenance came to an end when it was discovered that a contractor had got into serious financial difficulty; the work was brought in-house.

The first quadruple-track section of the MS&LR, between Gorton and Ashburys, were drawn up in 1860. Negotiations were required with the LNWR over the use of the proposed widened lines between Ardwick junction and London Road. The MS&LR were to vacate the original pair of tracks and be given the exclusive use of the two new lines on the northern side, except in the case of accidents, and have access across the LNWR to the MSJ&AR line. Although this seemed to be agreed smoothly enough with the LNWR, that company later used its primacy at London Road and the need for MS&LR trains to cross to the southern side there, as a means of obstructing MS&LR expansion.

== Edward Watkin ==
James Allport resigned on 20 July 1853, effective at the end of September; he went to the Midland Railway. A shareholders' consultative committee had been set up and was require to be involved in strategic decisions of the company; it appears that Allport considered this to be an infringement of his role.

Edward William Watkin took over in his place on 1 January 1854. He had been the assistant of Huish at the LNWR and he revealed that the latter, in spite of the Euston Square agreement, had been negotiating with the GNR for a territorial division between the two companies, to the detriment of the MS&LR. Dow refers to this as "deplorable duplicity" by Huish.

Watkin had a challenge before him; at this time traffic receipts were falling short of fixed obligations by about £1,000 a week. Huish resumed his attempts at coercion. Members of the LNWR and MS&LR boards met at Rugby on 20 July 1854. It was agreed that the two railways should be worked as one interest with a scheme for sharing income and expenses. The treaty was regarded as continuous and subject only to seven years' notice of termination by either side. The agreement was finalised on 29 July 1854. Later in the year the LNWR offered to perform the whole of the MS&LR's passenger and parcels business at London Road station, including collection and delivery by van, for £600 a year. This was accepted and the MS&LR withdrew its staff. It was a move that the MS&LR came to regret.

Financially, 1855 was not a good year for the MS&LR. Trade generally had been adversely affected by the blockade of the Baltic ports, owing to the Crimean War. Passenger traffic showed decreases in all categories except second class. In the same year the maintenance of permanent way was changed from direct to contractors.

== The end of the Euston Confederacy ==
In the 1856 session of Parliament, the North Western Railway (a small company unconnected with the London and North Western Railway) was applying for running powers over part of the LNWR. In the course of the examination of witnesses, the illegal "common-purse" agreement which existed between the London and North Western and the Midland Railway was exposed. Euston Square was now vulnerable to a Chancery suit, and, in the spring of 1857 a director of the Great Northern Railway filed a petition in Chancery. The LNWR position was indefensible and Euston Square had no option but to terminate the arrangement; this was done on 12 May 1857. The Euston Square Confederacy was neutralised.

Huish attempted further duplicity in trying to agree a sharing of traffic with the Great Northern Railway, but that company saw the danger and refused. The MS&LR decided to sever all agreements with the LNWR, and to form an alliance with the Great Northern Railway. The process to conclude these things took some time, but it resulted in transfer of the Manchester to London express passenger service to the route via Retford and the Great Northern Railway, in the same journey time as formerly via the LNWR. Of course much mineral traffic followed this transfer. Some of the track between Wadsley Bridge and Oughty Bridge still had the original stone-block sleepered track, and this had to be hastily modernised. (At the beginning of 1858 an inspection indicated that the last of the stone block sleepers in the main line had gone).

The LNWR continued to use underhand tactics of all kinds to frustrate the smooth operation of MS&LR and GNR trains, especially at Manchester. The warfare continued despite the efforts of neutral railway companies to mediate, and it was not until 12 November 1858 that a peaceful agreement was concluded. Throughout the process, Huish had been pursuing personal antagonistic objectives, and had steadily lost the confidence of his own board, and on 11 September 1858 his resignation was accepted.

== Domestic branch lines ==
=== Penistone to Barnsley branch ===
Towards the end of 1851 the Board had considered the restarting of the Barnsley branch construction, which had been promised but never proceeded with. In the meantime, other companies had connected the town: the Sheffield, Rotherham, Barnsley, Wakefield, Huddersfield and Goole Railway and the South Yorkshire Railway. It was at last completed, opening in three stages, from 15 May 1854 to 12 February 1857.

=== Birley coal branch ===
The Birley coal branch, turning west from Woodhouse and 2 3/4 miles in length, was brought into use in June 1855.

=== Hyde branch and extension to New Mills ===
Manchester, Sheffield and Lincolnshire Railway (Newton and Compstall Line) Act 1858
- Act of Parliament
- Parliament of the United Kingdom
- Long title: An Act for enabling the Manchester, Sheffield, and Lincolnshire Railway Company to make a Railway from near their Newton and Hyde Station to the Township of Marple in the Parish of Stockport in the County of Chester, to be called the Newton and Compstall Branch; and for other Purposes.
- Citation: 21 & 22 Vict. c. lxxv

Dates
- Royal assent: 28 June 1858

The MS&LR opened a branch to Hyde from Newton, on the main line on 1 March 1858. Newton station had been called Newton & Hyde (now Hyde North), and an omnibus service to Hyde itself had been operated at one time. (The Hyde station is now Hyde Central.) Authorisation was given by the {Manchester, Sheffield and Lincolnshire Railway (Newton and Compstall Line) Act 1858 (21 & 22 Vict. c. lxxv) to extend the Hyde branch to Compstall Bridge, then a local centre of industry. In fact the extension was from Hyde to Marple, with intermediate stations at Woodley and Romiley; it opened on 5 August 1862.

Marple, New Mills and Hayfield Junction Railway Act 1860
- Act of Parliament
- Parliament of the United Kingdom
- Long title: An Act for incorporating a Company for the Construction of a Railway from the Newton and Compstall Line of the Manchester, Sheffield, and Lincolnshire Railway at Marple in the County of Chester to New Mills and Hayfield in the County of Derby; and for other Purposes.
- Citation: 23 & 24 Vict. c. xv

Dates
- Royal assent: 15 May 1860

Text of statute as originally enacted

Marple, New Mills and Hayfield Junction Railway Act 1864
- Act of Parliament
- Parliament of the United Kingdom
- Long title: An Act for altering the Marple New Mills and Hayfield Junction Railway; extending the Time for Completion of Portions thereof; and for other Purposes.
- Citation: 27 & 28 Vict. c. vii

Dates
- Royal assent: 28 April 1864

Manchester, Sheffield and Lincolnshire Railway (Purchase, &c.) Act 1865
- Act of Parliament
- Parliament of the United Kingdom
- Long title: An Act for amalgamating the Undertaking of the Marple New Mills and Hayfield Junction Railway Company with that of the Manchester, Sheffield, and Lincolnshire Railway Company; and for authorizing the last-mentioned Company to subscribe to the Undertaking of the Liverpool Central Station Railway Company; and for other Purposes.
- Citation: 28 & 29 Vict. c. ccxlviii

Dates
- Royal assent: 5 July 1865

Text of statute as originally enacted

A further extension looked advantageous, and this was conceived as a nominally independent company, the Marple, New Mills and Hayfield Junction Railway (MNM&HJR). Sponsored by the MS&LR it was authorised by the Marple, New Mills and Hayfield Junction Railway Act 1860 (23 & 24 Vict. c. xv) on 15 May 1860. It was to extend to New Mills with a branch from there to Hayfield. From Marple to New Mills the line opened for goods on 1 July 1865 and for passengers on 1 February 1867. Meanwhile, the Midland Railway was building a line up from near Miller's Dale, joining the MNM&HJR at New Mills; it opened on 1 October 1866. This gave the Midland Railway access to the MS&LR system, and thereby to Manchester. The Marple, New Mills and Hayfield Junction Railway Company was acquired by the MS&LR on 5 July 1865 under the Manchester, Sheffield and Lincolnshire Railway (Purchase, &c.) Act 1865 (28 & 29 Vict. c. ccxlviii).

== Oldham, Ashton and Guide Bridge Railway ==
The MS&LR had sought the support of the LNWR and L&YR for the construction of a south-to-north line from Guide Bridge to Oldham, connecting with those companies' lines. The Oldham, Ashton and Guide Bridge Railway (OA&GBR) was authorised on 10 August 1857, with capital of £140,000. The MS&LR was anxious to secure the commitment of the LNWR to the project, partly to disarm LNWR plans to build their own line there. The L&YR had at first expressed preparedness to support the line, but in negotiations which dragged into 1858 the L&YR as clearly determined to keep the LNWR out, and the L&YR withdrew. Accordingly, on 30 June 1862 the OA&GBR was leased to the MS&LR and LNWR. Each subscribed £50,000.

By the end of March 1860 the line had been finished between Guide Bridge and the junction with the L&YR near Ashton-under-Lyne, but unusually wet weather delayed the completion of the remainder. On 31 July 1861 the line was opened formally. Passenger trains started running on 26 August, the MS&LR providing the locomotives and carriages; goods traffic did not start until 1 February 1863.

== Reaching toward Liverpool ==
Liverpool was a prime seaport with a huge volume of international and coastwise trade, and was consequently of strategic importance for railways in the region. The MS&LR reached as far west as Manchester, and was joint owner of the Manchester South Junction and Altrincham Railway. The MS&LR began to consider how it might reach Liverpool without dependency of the LNWR, which was generally hostile and obstructive.

=== St Helens Railway ===
The St Helens and Runcorn Gap Railway had been built to convey minerals south from St Helens to the River Mersey. It had opened on 21 February 1833, and its route included rope worked inclines. It amalgamated with the Sankey Brook Navigation, forming the St Helens Canal and Railway by an act of Parliament, the St. Helens Canal and Railway Act 1845 (8 & 9 Vict. c. cxvii), of 21 July 1845. (Note: Date according to Grant (2017); 21 May 1845 according to Holt & Biddle (1986).) The construction of the Liverpool and Manchester Railway showed that merely acting as a feeder to waterborne transport was no longer competitive.

John Meadows Rendel, the engineer of Birkenhead docks, recommended the development of a dock at Garston, on the Mersey south of Liverpool, and a connecting railway. This was authorised in 1846; it diverged from the original line to Runcorn Gap just north of the Mersey and ran west to Garston. It opened on 1 July 1852, and the dock at Garston opened on 21 July 1853. A line eastwards to Warrington was built from a junction with the new line, and was opened on 1 February 1853.

=== Warrington and Altrincham Junction Railway ===
The Warrington and Altrincham Junction Railway (W&AJR) was authorised by the Warrington and Altrincham Junction Railway Act 1851 (14 & 15 Vict. c. lxxi) on 3 July 1851. It was to make a line from the St Helens Railway at Warrington to Timperley Junction (facing Manchester) on the MSJ&AR. The W&AJR and the St Helens Railway were closely associated, sharing directors.

The W&AJR changed its name to the Warrington and Stockport Railway by an act of Parliament, the Warrington and Stockport Railway Act 1853 (16 & 17 Vict. c. cxxii), on 4 August 1853 when it got powers to extend eastwards to Stockport. On 1 May 1854 it opened its line between Timperley, on the MSJ&AR, and Warrington, and the St Helens Railway was extended a short distance from its Warrington terminal to meet the Warrington and Stockport line at Arpley station, in 1854. On 13 August 1859 the Warrington and Stockport Railway was leased to the LNWR and St Helens companies jointly, and on 14 June 1860 the St Helens company's line from Warrington to Garston was leased to the LNWR.

=== Stockport and Woodley Junction Railway ===
The Stockport and Woodley Junction Railway was authorised on 15 May 1860 by the Stockport and Woodley Junction Railway Act 1860 (23 & 24 Vict. c. xvi) to make a line from Woodley, on the line between Newton & Hyde and Marple stations. It opened on 12 May 1863, giving access to Stockport round the south side of Manchester. An east to south connection from Godley to Woodley was later constructed, enabling through running from the Sheffield direction to Woodley; it opened on 1 February 1866. This short line was vested in the Cheshire Lines Committee (CLC) on 10 August 1866.

=== Manchester, Sheffield and Lincolnshire Railway trains to Liverpool ===
The MS&LR now had access to Garston over the St Helens line, from the MS&LR. At first the St Helens company worked the line, but the working was taken over by the MS&LR from 1 October 1856. From 1 February 1858 the MS&LR in collaboration with the GNR ran express trains between Garston and London; an "express omnibus" connection was provided over the five miles between Garston and Liverpool. In 1858 and 1859 an MS&LR steamer, brought round from the River Humber service, made the connection instead. Yet the LNWR could set London passengers and goods down in the centre of Liverpool, and the gap from Garston made the MS&LR and GNR service unattractive.

From September 1859, the GNR changed its routing: through coaches and goods wagons were worked over the LNWR's Liverpool & Manchester line, via Newton-le-Willows, and both the GNR and MS&LR opened offices at various stations in Liverpool, including Lime Street, Wapping and Waterloo. This arrangement was better than the use of the Garston terminal, but it involved a heavy dependency on the LNWR, and that company was not a comfortable partner. In March 1861 the MS&LR held a meeting to generate support for a new railway northwards from Garston. The outcome was the Garston and Liverpool Railway, which received its act of Parliament, the Garston and Liverpool Railway Act 1861 (24 & 25 Vict. c. xxxv), on 17 May 1861. It was to be a four-mile double track line with a terminus at Queen's Dock, although this was altered to Brunswick Dock in 1862. Meanwhile, the LNWR had leased the St Helens Railway from 1860, and absorbed it in 1864, as part of its own plan for an improved route from Liverpool to the south, avoiding the detour via Newton le Willows.

The line from Garston to Brunswick Dock opened on 1 June 1864. This was still not entirely satisfactory, for Brunswick Dock station was not in central Liverpool. The Liverpool Central Station Railway Act 1864 (27 & 28 Vict. c. ccxc) of 29 July 1864 permitted a "difficult and costly" further extension to a new Liverpool Central Station. The extension line was floated as a separate company named the Liverpool Central Station Railway. Negotiations for land acquisition in the prime districts of Liverpool were protracted, and took until 1869, and the first construction contract was not awarded until July 1870, six years after authorisation, and the "daunting" task began.

=== London and North Western Railway hostility ===
The Great Northern Railway and the MS&LR had running powers from Timperley to Garston over the LNWR, mandated in the original Garston and Liverpool Railway Act 1861 (24 & 25 Vict. c. xxxv). This gave the partners a through Manchester – Liverpool route; they already had powers for access to Lime Street, Waterloo and Wapping. These various running powers and the impending extension to Liverpool Central began to antagonise the LNWR, which became belligerent. In October 1864 it locked the GNR/MS&LR booking clerks out of their offices at Waterloo; this was followed by closure of the Wapping office; papers there were ransacked. In January 1865 the allies were told to withdraw staff from Lime Street and send traffic only via Warrington. Two daily passenger trains continued to use Lime Street, but the LNWR did not show them in the timetable, refused to service the coaches, and would not allow local Liverpool – Manchester passengers to board them. They were withdrawn in October 1865, losing money heavily.

== Cheshire Lines ==
As well as the push towards Liverpool, Watkin wanted the MS&LR to expand into the industrial, chemical and mineral areas of the Cheshire Plain as well. It did so by encouraging a number of apparently independent companies.

=== Cheshire Midland Railway ===
The Cheshire Midland Railway was authorised by an act of Parliament, the Cheshire Midland Railway Act 1860 (23 & 24 Vict. c. xc), on 14 June 1860, to build a line from Altrincham on the MSJ&AR to Northwich. It opened from Altrincham to Knutsford on 12 May 1862, and from Knutsford to Northwich on 1 January 1863.

=== West Cheshire Railway ===
The West Cheshire Railway was incorporated by the West Cheshire Railways Act 1861 (24 & 25 Vict. c. cxliii) on 11 July 1861. Although a line from Northwich to Chester had been proposed, the powers were limited to a line as far as Mouldsworth, then running north to Helsby. In 1862 a second attempt to get approval for the line to Chester was also refused, although a short branch to Winsford was allowed. Construction was rather delayed, and the line from Northwich to Helsby opened for goods traffic on 1 September 1869, and for passenger trains on 22 June 1870; the Winsford branch opened in 1870.

=== Stockport, Timperley and Altrincham Junction Railway ===
In concert with the Great Northern Railway, the MS&LR promoted the Stockport, Timperley and Altrincham Junction Railway (ST&AJR). It was authorised by an act of Parliament, the Stockport, Timperley and Altrincham Junction Railway Act 1861 (24 & 25 Vict. c. clxxv), of 22 July 1861, to build from Stockport (on the Stockport and Woodley Junction Railway) to a junction at Broadheath on the Warrington and Stockport Railway, with a spur to Timperley on the Manchester, South Junction and Altrincham Railway, facing away from Manchester. The ST&AJR opened from Portwood, east of Stockport, to Deansgate Junction, on the MSJ&AR, on 1 December 1865. A short spur (Skelton Junction to Broadheath Junction) connected to the Warrington and Stockport Railway, opening on 1 February 1866. This line gave access south-west of Manchester avoiding the congestion of the approaches to the conurbation. The line was managed by a joint committee of the GNR and the MS&LR.

== Resignation of Watkin ==
Watkin had interests in railways outside the MS&LR and, being granted three months leave of absence to recover his health, agreed to examine the affairs of the Grand Trunk Railway of Canada. The MS&LR was once again on the verge of an association with the GNR and, possibly the LNWR, that would resolve its financial problems. However an event in the final months of 1861, during his absence, upset his plans. The Midland Railway was determined to find a path into Manchester. It was already building an extension to Buxton from Rowsley but the LNWR was proceeding into Buxton from the other direction. One day, it is said, some directors of the MS&LR met James Allport and others, while the latter were prospecting an alternative route. The upshot was that the MS&LR agreed to share their line from New Mills with the Midland, the latter extending their line to meet it. This, which was later approved as the Sheffield and Midland Railway Companies' Committee, threatened to cause a schism with the GNR, who saw this as bad faith regarding their co-operative agreement with the MS&LR. Clearly the MS&LR could not countenance another major line in their territory, but Watkin was incensed, and tendered his resignation. Dow refers to Watkin's behaviour as "petulance which smacked unpleasantly of his departed tutor Huish". Robert George Underdown was immediately appointed General Manager.

It was obvious that Watkin regretted his departure from the General Managership of the MS&LR. He retained directorial posts but was glad to attain the Chairmanship of the company on 27 January 1864.

The company's financial performance had long been disappointing: ordinary dividends from 1846 until 1899 never exceeded 3 1/2% for a whole year and for nine years were in default.

== Establishment of the Cheshire Lines Committee ==
The Great Northern Railway (Cheshire Lines) Act 1863 (26 & 27 Vict. c. cxlvii) allowed the GNR and the MS&LR to regulate traffic on lines built, or proposed to be built in the Cheshire area. The Midland Railway was something of a latecomer to the area and became a natural ally of the MS&LR and the GNR locally, and was admitted to the controlling group.

The Cheshire Lines Transfer Act 1865 (28 & 29 Vict. c. cccxxvii) of 5 July 1865 therefore allowed the Midland Railway to join in the committee which it did in 1866. The Cheshire Lines Act 1867 (30 & 31 Vict. c. ccvii) of 15 August 1867 named the resultant group as the Cheshire Lines Committee (CLC) and gave it complete autonomy. (Note: Although referred to as a "committee" the Cheshire Lines Committee was an incorporated body, and the owner of physical assets.)

The constituent companies absorbed by the committee were;

- The Stockport and Woodley Junction Railway;
- The Stockport, Timperley and Altrincham Junction Railway;
- The West Cheshire Railway;
- The Cheshire Midland Railway;
- The Garston and Liverpool Railway.

The powers of the Liverpool Central Station Railway were acquired on 30 July 1866.

Smith and Anderson describe the rolling stock:

Initially the CLC hired carriages and wagons from the owning partners, but soon purchased its own rolling stock. By the grouping of 1923 it had nearly 600 coaches and over 4,000 goods vehicles on its books. Many of the former were used on Liverpool-Manchester expresses and they exuded luxury. Handsome composites built by the Lancaster Carriage & Wagon Company had first class compartments lined in mahogany and upholstered with green or brown velvet, whilst the exceptionally fine coaches supplied by Great Central workshops (in 1914) featured first class accommodation finished in walnut and sycamore with fittings of oxidised copper and deep blue cloth seats. Such opulence was understandable in view of the popularity of the CLC service, but this was only possible because of the extension to Liverpool Central.

== Chester and West Cheshire Junction Railway ==
The West Cheshire Railway had been denied direct access to Chester in 1861 and 1862. Finally an act of 5 July 1865, the Chester and West Cheshire Junction Railway Act 1865 (28 & 29 Vict. c. ccxcii) authorised the Chester and West Cheshire Junction Railway to build from the West Cheshire Railway at Mouldsworth to a new Chester station, named Northgate. The company was acquired by the Cheshire Lines Committee (CLC) on 10 August 1866. Construction was greatly delayed, and the line was opened on 2 November 1874 for goods trains and on 1 May 1875 for passengers.

== Sheffield and Midland Railway Companies' Committee ==
The Marple, New Mills and Hayfield Junction Railway (MNM&HJR), sponsored by the MS&LR was incorporated on 15 May 1860. It opened as far as New Mills on 1 July 1865 (goods) and 1 February 1867 (passengers). Meanwhile, the Midland Railway had built a line up from Miller's Dale, joining the MNM&HJR at New Mills, and opening on 1 October 1866. This gave the Midland Railway access to Manchester, and the MS&LR regarded it as an ally. The inbound journey for Midland trains was via Romiley, Hyde and Guide Bridge. The MNM&HJR company was acquired by the MS&LR on 5 July 1865.

On 16 July 1866 the Manchester and Stockport Railway was incorporated by the Manchester and Stockport Railway Act 1866 (29 & 30 Vict. c. ccvii), sponsored by the MS&LR. This sanctioned a line of 4 1/2 miles from Ashburys to Brinnington Junction on the Stockport and Woodley (now CLC) line, with a branch of 2 3/4 miles from Reddish junction to Romiley on the New Mills line. It was conceived chiefly to give the Midland Railway access into Manchester, and it was intended that the Midland would adopt joint ownership of the line, as well as the existing line between Hyde Junction and New Mills. Midland trains started to use London Road from 1 February 1867. On 24 June 1869 the still unfinished Manchester and Stockport Railway, and the line from Hyde to New Mills, and the branch from New Mills to Hayfield, were vested jointly in the MS&LR and the Midland, from then onwards known as the Sheffield and Midland Committee Lines. Like the CLC, this committee was a corporate body owning physical assets.

== South Yorkshire Railway ==
The South Yorkshire Railway (SYR) had established a small network primarily oriented to mineral traffic, opened from Doncaster to Swinton in 1849, and to Barnsley in 1851. On 10 September 1859 the SYR opened from Doncaster and Keadby. Already in 1861 the SYR had carried a million tons of coal. On 23 June 1864 the MS&LR was authorised to lease the SYR for 999 years. The MS&LR got a follow-up act of Parliament, the Manchester, Sheffield and Lincolnshire Railway (Purchase, &c.) Act 1865 (28 & 29 Vict. c. ccxlviii), on 5 July 1865 which provided for an extensive interchange of running powers with the Midland Railway. The MS&LR was to connect from Barnsley on to the Midland main line by means of a new branch to Cudworth, and then continue northwards to the West Riding & Grimsby Railway near Oakenshaw.

The SYR had started the process of reaching Hull, having agreed with the North Eastern Railway (NER) to construct such a line, the SYR portion finishing at Thorne. That line opened on 2 August 1869 and the MS&LR started running through to Hull over the NER. The southern fork to Keadby opened on the same day.

On 16 July 1874 the South Yorkshire Railway and River Dun Company's Vesting Act 1874 (37 & 38 Vict. c. cxxxi) dissolved the SYR, transferring it to the MS&LR absolutely. 76 route miles of railway and 60 miles of canal transferred to MS&LR ownership.

=== Cleethorpes ===
On 6 April 1863 the Cleethorpes extension from Grimsby was opened; it was a single line, later doubled in 1874.

=== Scunthorpe line ===
In 1858 ironstone deposits were discovered at Frodingham, a few miles east of the River Trent, where Keadby was located on the west side. The Trent, Ancholme and Grimsby Railway was sponsored by the MS&LR and the SYR together to fill in the gap from Keadby to Barnetby. It was authorised by the Trent, Ancholme and Grimsby Railway Act 1861 (24 & 25 Vict. c. clvi), and required a bridge at Althorpe to cross the Trent. The line opened to goods on 1 May 1866 and passengers on 1 October 1866. The Frodingham ironstone resource gave rise to the massive Scunthorpe ironworks.

== West Riding and Grimsby Joint Railway ==
The West Riding and Grimsby Joint Railway was promoted by the South Yorkshire Railway (SYR) in 1862 as the West Riding, Hull and Grimsby Railway, extending from Wakefield to a junction with the SYR at Stainforth, with a branch from Adwick to Doncaster. Hull and Grimsby were included in the title as distant objectives, rather than places to be included in the network: the SYR was separately planning a line to Hull, and already ran to Keadby with aspirations to continue to Grimsby. Hull was omitted from the title by the time of incorporation on 7 August 1862.

The Great Northern Railway was alarmed by the interest that the MS&LR was taking in the line: it was leasing the SYR. The MS&LR appeared to be friendly with the Great Eastern Railway, which the GNR was at pains to keep out of the area. After much negotiation the West Riding and Grimsby Railway (Transfer) Act 1866 (29 & 30 Vict. c. clxii) authorised the GNR and the MS&LR to become joint owners of the line. The settlement gave the MS&LR running powers over existing GNR lines north-west of Wakefield. The direct benefit to the GNR was a route from Doncaster to Wakefield avoiding dependency on the Lancashire and Yorkshire Railway.

The Doncaster – Adwick – Wakefield part of the WR&GR was opened in February 1866, but the section from Adwick junction to Stainforth junction was delayed until the SYR finished its Doncaster – Thorne direct line, in November 1866.

== Independent access to Liverpool ==
Manchester, Sheffield and Lincolnshire Railway (Extension to Liverpool) Act 1865
- Act of Parliament
- Parliament of the United Kingdom
- Long title: An Act for amalgamating the Undertaking of the Marple New Mills and Hayfield Junction Railway Company with that of the Manchester, Sheffield, and Lincolnshire Railway Company; and for authorizing the last-mentioned Company to subscribe to the Undertaking of the Liverpool Central Station Railway Company; and for other Purposes.
- Citation: 28 & 29 Vict. c. ccclxxviii

Dates
- Royal assent: 5 July 1865

Text of statute as originally enacted

Notwithstanding the construction of the Garston and Liverpool line, the MS&LR could only get access to Liverpool by running over a lengthy section of the LNWR from Timperley Junction to Garston. Watkin saw that this was untenable, and determined to build an independent line. He deposited a bill for a new line from Old Trafford (on the MSJ&AR on the edge of Manchester) to a junction with the Garston and Liverpool line near Cressington, as well as a link from Timperley to Glazebrook, joining the proposed line. The Old Trafford to Garston line was sanctioned by the Manchester, Sheffield and Lincolnshire Railway (Extension to Liverpool) Act 1865 (28 & 29 Vict. c. ccclxxviii) of 5 July.

Manchester, Sheffield, and Lincolnshire Railway (Liverpool Extension) Act 1866
- Act of Parliament
- Parliament of the United Kingdom
- Long title: An Act for constituting the Great Northern and Midland Railway Companies joint Owners of the Railway authorized by the Manchester, Sheffield, and Lincolnshire Railway (Extension to Liverpool) Act, 1865; and for other Purposes.
- Citation: 29 & 30 Vict. c. cxci

Dates
- Royal assent: 16 July 1866

Text of statute as originally enacted

In 1866 authorisation was given for a slight change to the point of junction at Old Trafford, and for a loop line to give a Warrington station in the town; the original plan was a straight route some distance out on the north side. The (unbuilt) line was vested in the CLC on 16 July 1866 by the Manchester, Sheffield, and Lincolnshire Railway (Liverpool Extension) Act 1866 (29 & 30 Vict. c. cxci), thus making the Midland and Great Northern each responsible for one-third of its £750,000 share capital. The construction was not easy; at last on 1 March 1873 the first section, from Timperley to Cressington junction, near Garston, was opened for goods traffic; on 14 May a short spur to the LNWR at Allerton was opened. Passenger services started on 1 August 1873. The remaining section, from Cornbrook junction to Glazebrook junction was opened on 2 September. The two sections added 33 route miles of line to the system.

After a difficult construction period, Liverpool Central station opened on 1 March 1874. The passenger service from there to Manchester was sixteen trains each way, increasing steadily over subsequent decades. The passenger business at Brunswick station was discontinued from 1 March 1874. A connection to the dock lines was put in during 1884: a major traffic was bunkering coal for liners: in Great Central days the RMS Lusitania and RMS Mauretania needed 6,000 tons of coal for a trans-Atlantic crossing.

== North Liverpool Lines ==
The CLC still lacked practicable access to the northern docks at Liverpool, and having spent several years considering how an affordable route could be created, obtained the CLC North Liverpool Lines Act 1874 of 30 July 1874. This sanctioned an eleven-mile branch from Hunt's Cross on the main line to a terminus at Sandhills and a two and a quarter-mile connection from Fazakerley to the L&YR at Aintree. Triangular junctions were to be created by spurs from Hunt's Cross East to Halewood North and Fazakerley West to North.

In 1878 the name Huskisson was adopted in place of Sandhills for the terminus. The line opened on 1 December 1879, although the spurs at the junctions took until 1888. The two-mile section from Walton on the Hill to Huskisson opened for goods traffic on 1 July 1880. Passenger trains from Liverpool Central via Walton on the Hill were run from 2 August 1880, but they were an abject failure and were discontinued on 1 May 1885.

== Macclesfield ==
The Macclesfield, Bollington and Marple Railway was incorporated on 14 June 1864 (Note: 14 June 1864 according to Holt & Biddle (1986); 14 July 1864 according to Grant (2017).) to build a line from Marple Wharf Junction, on the Sheffield & Midland Joint line, to its own Macclesfield terminus, a distance of ten miles. It opened the line to passengers on 2 August 1869, and to goods in March 1870. A connection to the North Staffordshire Railway for goods traffic was made on 3 August 1871. (Note: Dates from Holt & Biddle (1986); Grant (2017) has "The line was opened throughout on 3 July 1871 for goods and on 1 July 1873 for passengers.")

The company was vested in the MS&LR and NSR on 25 May 1871, and the joint owners opened a new station, Macclesfield Central, on 1 July 1873.

== Manchester Central station and the South District Railway ==
The CLC was progressing towards having its own independent terminus, Manchester Central, authorised by the Cheshire Lines Act 1872 (35 & 36 Vict. c. lvii). The station opened on 9 July 1877. Immediately the CLC introduced an hourly express service to Liverpool, with a journey time of 45 minutes. The first station was a temporary building and the permanent structure was opened on 1 July 1880.

The South District Railway had been authorised by the Manchester South District Railway Act 1873 (36 & 37 Vict. c. ccxxii), an act of Parliament passed on 5 August 1873, to build from the CLC Liverpool Extension Railway at Throstle Nest Junction (east of Trafford Park Station) via Chorlton-cum-Hardy, and Didsbury to Alderley. It never reached Alderley, and the company was acquired by the Midland Railway on 12 August 1877. It opened to Heaton Mersey (CLC) on 1 January 1880, giving the Midland Railway access to the CLC lines and Central station.

The MS&LR was able to build a line from Fairfield junction (facing east) to Chorlton junction passing round the south of Manchester giving the MS&LR direct access from the east to the South District Line and Manchester Central station. It opened on 1 October 1891 from Chorlton Junction to Fallowfield, and the portion of the South District Line between Chorlton Junction and Throstle Nest Junction was transferred to the CLC on the same day. The line was extended to Fairfield Junction on 2 May 1892.

== Wigan Junction Railways ==
Expanded colliery activity around West Leigh and Wigan encouraged the MS&LR and the Midland Railway, working collaboratively as the Sheffield and Midland Committee to plan a line to get access. The scheme materialised as the Wigan Junction Railways, making a junction with the CLC west of Glazebrook and running north-west; junctions were planned with the LNWR and Lancashire Union Railway on the approach to Wigan. The company was incorporated on 16 July 1874. It was slow to make progress and the Midland withdrew its financial support; the MS&LR ensured that the line was solvent, to prevent it from falling into the hands of the LNWR. It opened from Glazebrook to Strangeways Hall Colliery, immediately west of Hindley, 16 October 1879; the MS&LR working the goods and mineral traffic. Connections with the LNWR at Amberswood East and West Junctions were made in July 1880. A passenger service was started on 1 April 1884; the line was extended to a temporary terminus at Darlington Street, on the edge of Wigan. A quarter-mile extension of the line to Wigan Central station was opened on 3 October 1892. The company was later taken over by the Great Central Railway.

== Southport and Cheshire Lines Extension Railway ==
In 1878 municipal authorities in Southport asked the CLC to extend the North Liverpool line from Aintree to Southport. In 1880 the CLC set up a separate company for the purpose and a bill was prepared for a Southport and Cheshire Lines Extension Railway; it passed as the Southport and Cheshire Lines Extension Railway Act 1881 (44 & 45 Vict. c. cxciii) on 11 September 1881. The line opened on 1 September 1884, to Birkdale, and throughout on 18 August 1882. It was worked by the Cheshire Lines Committee although it retained its separate identity.

== The Liverpool, St Helens and South Lancashire Railway ==
After the Wigan Junction Railways opened in 1879, a branch from them to St Helens was promoted locally, as the St Helens and Wigan Junction Railway. It was authorised on 22 July 1885, and the MS&LR supported it financially. It was renamed the Liverpool, St Helens and South Lancashire Railway on 26 July 1889, but the possibility extending it beyond St Helens to Liverpool gradually faded. It opened for goods traffic on 1 July 1895, and a passenger service started on 3 January 1900. It was worked by the MS&LR.

== Wrexham, Mold and Connah's Quay Railway ==
The Wrexham, Mold and Connah's Quay Railway (WM&CQR) had established itself as a carrier of minerals from the Brymbo area west of Wrexham to the River Dee and to the main lien railways nearby. In 1881 it proposed to cross the river and expand into the Wirral, but the scheme was unsuccessful for the time being.

It was revived and in 1884 a crossing of the Dee was authorised. The London and North Western Railway was unhelpful, and the WM&CQR asked the MS&LR for financial assistance. The MS&LR agreed to build from the WM&CQR at Hawarden, on the south side of the Dee, crossing the river and swinging east to run to Chester. The MS&LR part of this was called the Chester and Connah's Quay Railway; it was authorised on 31 July 1885. At Chester it connected to the Cheshire Lines Committee network giving the MS&LR access from its own network further east. The Dee crossing, by means of the Hawarden Bridge, was a huge structure: it was opened on 3 August 1889, and the line from Chester to Connah's Quay, crossing the bridge, was opened on 31 March 1890. A Chester to Wrexham passenger service of three trains a day was started, worked by the MS&LR.

The MS&LR and the WM&CQR together built a line from Hawarden to Bidston, connecting there with the Wirral Railway. The line was called the North Wales and Liverpool Railway. The WM&CQR relied on heavy financial support from the MS&LR, which had acquired a majority share holding in the Wrexham company. The Bidston line opened for goods trains on 16 March 1896, and passenger services (to Seacombe via Bidston) followed on 18 May 1896, worked by the WM&CQR but using hired MS&LR locomotives. The MS&LR did not have running powers over the Wirral Railway at Bidston, so the WM&CQR worked the line itself, using hired MS&LR engines hired to them, but with their numbers painted out and WM&CQR numbers added.

== Growth of mineral traffic ==
Mineral traffic, especially coal, had long been dominant in the business of the MS&LR. In the final three decades of the nineteenth century, the volume of mineral trade expanded considerably, and overwhelmed the capacity of the network to carry it. Following serious complaint by the business community, a series of widenings was carried out.

== The London extension ==
Manchester, Sheffield, and Lincolnshire Railway Act 1878
- Act of Parliament
- Parliament of the United Kingdom
- Long title: An Act for authorising the Manchester, Sheffield, and Lincolnshire Railway Company to make a new Branch Railway and other works; for conferring upon them additional powers; and for other purposes.
- Citation: 41 & 42 Vict. c. xxx

Dates
- Royal assent: 16 April 1878

Text of statute as originally enacted

Manchester, Sheffield and Lincolnshire Railway Act 1887
- Act of Parliament
- Parliament of the United Kingdom
- Long title: An Act to confer further powers on the Manchester Sheffield and Lincolnshire Railway Company in connection with their undertaking and the undertakings of other companies and for other purposes.
- Citation: 50 & 51 Vict. c. xvii

Dates
- Royal assent: 28 April 1887

Text of statute as originally enacted

From 1883 at the latest Watkin had considered that the MS&LR should try to extend to London, which was the principal market for coal from its area. The means of achieving this were not obvious, but on 26 July 1889 parliamentary permission was obtained for a line from Beighton, where the MS&LR crossed the Midland Railway, to Annesley, and a branch to Chesterfield. This was the first step on the road to London. The years 1890–1894 were dominated by the campaign for the London extension.

When it had been won, Watkin withdrew from the centre of the railway stage. Dow (1962) says:

"To his successors Watkin left the well-nigh impossible task of making pay a line which Sir John Clapham, a contemporary economic historian, described as 'a belated, and almost entirely superfluous, product of the original era of fighting construction'."

Construction of the so-called Derbyshire lines, which were to extend the MS&LR to the Great Northern at Annesley junction and its trains to Nottingham proceeded: the first section from Beighton to Staveley Works opened on 1 December 1891; on 4 June 1892 the section from Staveley Town to Chesterfield was opened. Then from Staveley Town to Annesley junction was opened on 24 October 1892; MS&LR coal and goods trains began running to Nottingham; Colwick, instead of Doncaster, now became the exchange point with the LNWR for coal bound for the south.

Watkin's clear intention now was to get a line to London, using the Metropolitan Railway for the southernmost lap, but he knew that he risked warfare with allied railways, especially the Great Northern Railway, if he did not tread carefully. On 16 September 1889 he wrote to the Great Northern Railway (GNR), consulting its chairman about the GNR's possible reaction. He suggested that the GNR could avoid necessary piecemeal widenings of its own main line by joining a traffic agreement with the MS&LR for London traffic. Watkin's diplomacy deserted him, however, when he wrote again adding a second "string to your bow would give great strength and profit to the Great Northern, and would in all senses be better than wasting your shareholders' capital on the plastering of your old line."

Manchester, Sheffield, and Lincolnshire Railway Act 1893
- Act of Parliament
- Parliament of the United Kingdom
- Long title: An Act to confer further powers upon the Manchester Sheffield and Lincolnshire Railway Company and upon the St. Helens and Wigan Junction Railway Company the Wrexham Mold and Connah's Quay Railway Company and the Blackpool Railway Company and for other purposes.
- Citation: 56 & 57 Vict. c. lxxix

Dates
- Royal assent: 28 March 1893

Text of statute as originally enacted

The MS&LR went ahead on its own, and after a false start obtained royal assent in the Manchester, Sheffield and Lincolnshire Railway (Extension to London, &c.) Act 1893 (56 & 57 Vict. c. i) for the line to Marylebone on 28 March 1893. The line would need £6 million of capital. (In fact the outturn was about double that figure.) The times were bad for raising money. By now Watkin had had enough of railway politics, and his health was imperfect. He wrote resigning his chairmanship on 19 May 1894; it was accepted on 25 May.

In 1896 the London extension was progressing, and thought was given to changing the company's name. On 27 March 1896 "Manchester, Sheffield and London" was considered, but then "Central" or "Great Central". The Central London Railway objected, but to no avail. "Great Central Railway" was decided upon, and the new title was assumed on 1 August 1897 under section 80 of the Great Central Railway Act 1897 (60 & 61 Vict. c. liv).

There was still much to do on the London extension and associated railways. The ordinary dividend paid by the MS&LR had been poor for many years, and the huge expenditure on the London extension would need to be serviced. The Manchester, Sheffield and Lincolnshire Railway had been a west-to-east railway, handing over much of its lucrative traffic to partner railways or in some cases to hostile companies. Soon it would have its own line to London, and would earn revenue from mineral traffic to the southern counties. In addition it would serve some of the great towns of the Midlands and the northern Home Counties.

The narrative of the next years appears in the article Great Central Railway.

== Locomotive works ==
The locomotive works was situated at Gorton, Manchester, opened in 1849. They were known as "The Tank".

== Principal railway stations ==
- Manchester Central
- Sheffield Victoria
- Lincoln Central
- Grimsby

== Docks ==
Grimsby docks, in later days named "the largest fishing port in the world" (but also with a large trade in timber) became part of the railway at its inception. It was opened in 1801, using the natural harbour. Once it became railway property, the MS&LR increased the facilities by starting to construct a New Dock covering 25 acres (10 ha) in 1846; it was opened on 18 April 1852. Over the years more docks were added.

At Hull the MS&LR had a goods depot on Kingston Street, established 1879, built by and rented from the North Eastern Railway. The site of the goods station has been redeveloped as an ice arena, Hull Arena.

== Locomotive engineers ==
- 1846–1854 Richard Peacock
- 1854–1859 W. G. Craig
- 1859–1886 Charles R Sacre
- 1886–1893 Thomas Parker
- 1893–1897 Harry Pollitt (served the GCR until 1900)

== MS&LR locomotives ==
- Class D5 4-4-0 1894–1897 six of the class were built
- Class D7 4-4-0 1887–1894 operated the MS&LR express trains, Manchester to London (Kings' Cross, via Retford and G.N.R. line)
- Class D8 4-4-0 1888
- Class E2 2-4-0 1888 3 built for the Manchester-Grantham expresses
- Class F1 2-4-2T 1889–1893 39 built
- Class F2 2-4-2T 10 built
- Class J8 0-6-0
- Class J9 0-6-0
- Class J12 0-6-0
- Class J10 0-6-0
- Class J62 0-6-0ST 1897
  - (details of each of the above)

== Accidents and incidents ==
- On 12 December 1870, a goods train was being marshalled at Barnsley, and part of the train was left on a falling gradient of 1 in 119. The wagons were inadequately secured. When other wagons were fly-shunted on to them, they ran away down the gradient and collided with a passenger train at Stairfoot station. Fifteen persons were killed and 59 injured.
- On 16 July 1884, an express passenger train was derailed between Hazlehead Bridge and Penistone, Yorkshire due to the fracture of the crank axle on the locomotive hauling it. Nineteen people were killed.

== Bibliography ==
- Bairstow, Martin (2014). The Manchester South Junction & Altrincham Railway. Leeds: Martin Bairstow. ISBN 978-1-871944-43-3.
- Boyd, James I. C. (1991). The Wrexham, Mold and Connah's Quay Railway. Headington: Oakwood Press. ISBN 978-0-85361-417-3.
- Carter, Ernest F. (1959). An Historical Geography of the Railways of the British Isles. London: Cassell.
- Dixon, Frank (1994). The Manchester South Junction and Altrincham Railway. Headington: Oakwood Press. ISBN 978-0-85361-454-8.
- Dow, George (1945). The First Railway Across the Pennines. York: London and North Eastern Railway.
- Dow, George (1959). Great Central. Vol. I: The Progenitors, 1813–1863. London: Locomotive Publishing.
- Dow, George (1962). Great Central. Vol. II: Dominion of Watkin, 1864–1899. London: Locomotive Publishing.
- Grant, Donald J. (2017). Directory of the Railway Companies of Great Britain. Kibworth Beauchamp: Matador. ISBN 978-1-78589-353-7.
- Griffiths, R. Prys (1947). The Cheshire Lines Railway. Oakwood Press.
- Hall, Stanley (1990). The Railway Detectives. London: Ian Allan. ISBN 978-0-7110-1929-4.
- Holt, Geoffrey; Biddle, Gordon (1986). A Regional History of the Railways of Great Britain: volume 10: the North West. Nairn: David St John Thomas. ISBN 978-0-946537-34-1.
- Hoole, Ken (1983). Trains in Trouble. Vol. 4. Redruth: Atlantic Books. ISBN 978-0-906899-07-6.
- Joy, David (1984). A Regional History of the Railways of Great Britain. Vol. VIII: South and West Yorkshire. Newton Abbot: David & Charles. ISBN 978-0-946537-11-2.
- Leleux, Robin (1976). A Regional History of the Railways of Great Britain. Vol. IX: The East Midlands. Newton Abbot: David & Charles. ISBN 978-0-7153-7165-7.
- Stretton, Clement E. (1901). History of the Midland Railway. London: Methuen.
- Tomlinson, William Weaver (1914). The North Eastern Railway. Newcastle-upon-Tyne: Andrew Reid.
