= Stockport Tiviot Dale railway station =

Former railway station in Greater Manchester, England

Stockport Tiviot Dale
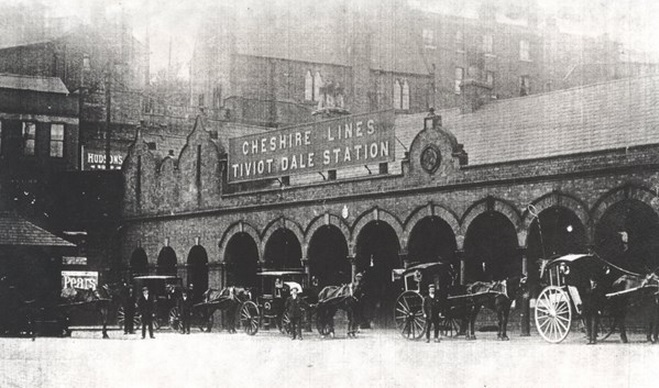
- Stockport Tiviot Dale railway station c.1902

General information
- Location: Stockport, Metropolitan Borough of Stockport; England
- Coordinates: 53.4148°N 2.1579°W
- Grid reference: SJ896908
- Platforms: 3

Other information
- Status: Disused

History
- Original company: Stockport, Timperley and Altrincham Junction Railway
- Pre-grouping: Cheshire Lines Committee
- Post-grouping: Cheshire Lines Committee

Key dates
- 1 December 1865: Station opened as Stockport Teviot Dale
- circa 1874: Renamed Stockport Tiviot Dale
- 2 January 1967: Station closed
Location

Stockport Tiviot Dale was one of two main railway stations serving the town of Stockport, Cheshire, England; the other being Stockport Edgeley, which is now simply referred to as Stockport. It was a stop on the Cheshire Lines Committee-operated Stockport, Timperley and Altrincham Junction Railway line.

Tiviot Dale was named after Teviotdale in Scotland. Prince Charles Stuart camped to the north of the town in 1745.

== History ==
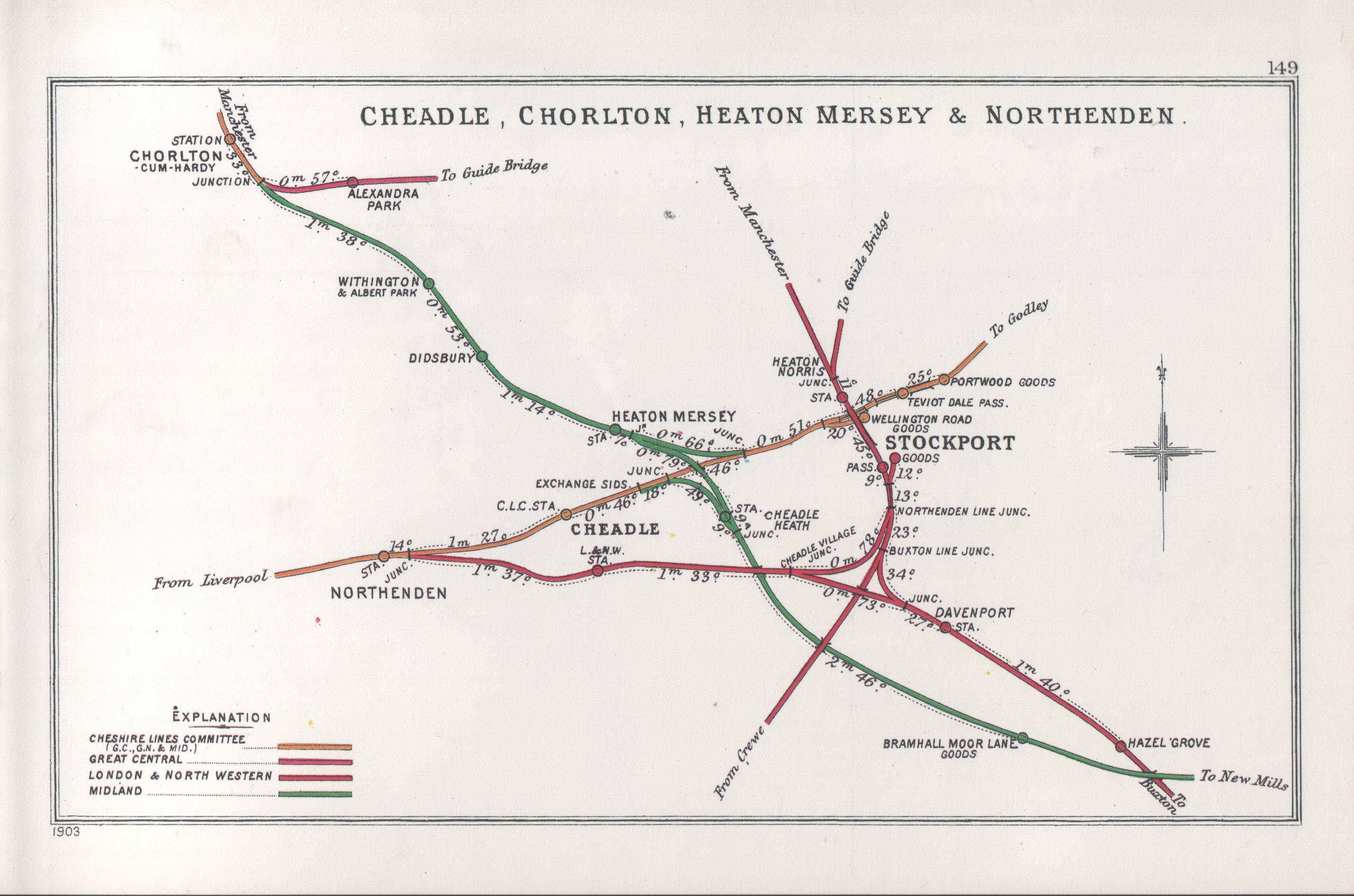
A 1903 Railway Clearing House Junction Diagram showing the station as Teviot Dale, a name often used locally; also the CLC line (in orange) through the station. The joining Midland Railway line (in green) is shown near Heaton Mersey, as are the nearby goods depots at Wellington Road and Portwood

Tiviot Dale station was located on the Cheshire Lines Committee (CLC) operated Stockport, Timperley and Altrincham Junction Railway line from Portwood to Skelton Junction, a section of what became the Woodley to Glazebrook line. It was situated at the bottom of Lancashire Hill, next to the present concrete motorway bridge. It was opened on 1 December 1865 and was originally known as Stockport Teviot Dale. From 1880, Tiviot Dale was also served by long-distance trains running on the Manchester South District Railway to London St Pancras.

Tiviot Dale remained a part of the CLC, which was jointly owned from 1923 by the London and North Eastern Railway (two-thirds) and the London Midland and Scottish Railway (one-third), until 1948 when it became part of the British Railways London Midland Region.

== Facilities ==
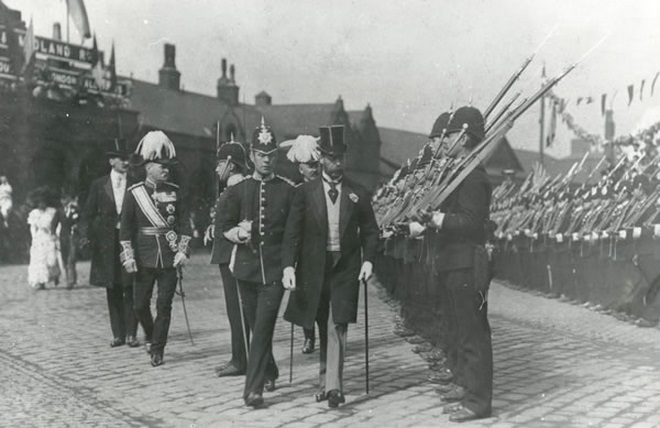
The Prince of Wales inspecting the guard of honour at Tiviot Dale station, 1908

The station buildings were substantially built. The main building, with the booking hall and waiting rooms, was located on the south side of the line, approached from Tiviot Dale. It had an ornate Jacobean-style external facade incorporating a long covered portico. There were four lines passing through the station; the central pair permitting goods and other trains to pass through without affecting trains stopping in the two main passenger platforms. There were shorter stub lines to the outer sides of the main platforms to accommodate local trains. A covered footbridge with an unusual arched profile linked the two sides of the station. Tiviot Dale signal box was located just west of the station, on the south side of the lines.

A small two-line engine shed was located immediately to the north of the station between 1866 and 1889, with a turntable and six short storage lines. It closed on the opening of Heaton Mersey engine shed in early 1889.

== Services ==
Services from the station included routes to Manchester Central, Liverpool Central via Warrington Central, Sheffield via the Hope Valley Line, Buxton and Derby, via Millers Dale.

Preceding station	Disused railways	Following station
Cheadle North; Line and station closed	Cheshire Lines Committee	Reddish North; Line closed, station open
Cheadle North; Line and station closed	Cheshire Lines Committee	Woodley; Line closed, station open
Cheadle North; Line and station closed	Cheshire Lines Committee	Romiley; Line closed, station open
Heaton Mersey; Line and station closed	Midland Railway	Reddish North; Line closed, station open

== Closure ==
The station was closed by British Railways on 2 January 1967, with most of its services having fallen victim to the Beeching Axe between 1964 and 1966. It was demolished the following year.

The lines through the station remained in heavy use by coal trains heading to Fiddlers Ferry power station, near Warrington, from the Woodhead Line; these ceased in 1980 when damage was caused to the nearby Tiviot Dale tunnel during construction work on the M63 motorway, now the M60, and the line closed temporarily for safety reasons.

The closure was made permanent west of Bredbury's stone terminal in 1982, following the demise of the Woodhead route; the track was lifted in 1986.

== The site today ==
The site of the main station building now lies under the M60 motorway. Most of the platform area has been buried under earth, but parts of the eastbound bay platform are still extant. The tunnel has been partially filled in and strengthened with steel supports.

The area surrounding the station was altered at the beginning of the 21st century to allow for the construction of a Tesco supermarket; further retail units on the other side of Tiviot Way were added later.
