= Macclesfield railway station (disambiguation) =

Macclesfield railway station serves Macclesfield, Cheshire, England.

Macclesfield railway station may also refer to:

- Macclesfield railway station (Macclesfield, Bollington and Marple Railway), a former station
- Macclesfield Hibel Road railway station, a former station

== See also ==
- Macclesfield (disambiguation)
