= Macclesfield railway station (Macclesfield, Bollington and Marple Railway) =

Former railway station in Cheshire, England

Macclesfield

General information
- Location: Macclesfield, Cheshire East; England
- Coordinates: 53.2641°N 2.1230°W
- Grid reference: SJ918741
- Platforms: 2

Other information
- Status: Disused

History
- Original company: Macclesfield, Bollington and Marple Railway
- Pre-grouping: Macclesfield Committee of the Manchester, Sheffield and Lincolnshire Railway and North Staffordshire Railways
- Post-grouping: Group Committee No. 1 of the London, Midland and Scottish Railway and London and North Eastern Railways

Key dates
- 2 August 1869: Opened
- 1 July 1873: Closed
Location

Macclesfield railway station was a short lived railway station serving the town of Macclesfield, in Cheshire, England. It was opened in 1869 by the Macclesfield, Bollington and Marple Railway (MB&M) – a joint line constructed and operated by the Manchester, Sheffield and Lincolnshire Railway (MS&L) and North Staffordshire Railways (NSR) – and closed in 1873.

== History ==
The MB&M was built with the intention of connecting to the main London and North Western Railway (LNWR) / NSR line between Manchester and Stoke however there were numerous difficulties to be overcome; the route through town, the reluctance of the local authority to allow the railway to bridge over the River Bollin and the lack of co-operation from the LNWR to agree to a site for a station on the Manchester—Stoke line.

The board of the MB&M therefore decided to open a temporary station on land they already owned to allow services to commence. The station, known simply as Macclesfield, opened on 2 August 1869 and was the southern terminus of the line. From there, passengers made a short walk to the joint LNWR/NSR station at Macclesfield Hibel Road to catch services to and from the south.

Four years elapsed before a route for the line through the town was constructed and a new joint NSR/MS&L station at Macclesfield Central built. The new Central station opened on 1 July 1873 and the old station closed the same day.

Following closure the old station buildings were used as stables for the horses working in the MB&M goods yard. In 1919, they had seen temporary use, once again, as a passenger station when rebuilding work of the section of line to Central station was undertaken. The buildings were demolished in 1947.

Preceding station	Disused railways	Following station
Bollington	Great Central Railway & North Staffordshire Railway; Macclesfield, Bollington and Marple Railway	Terminus

== The site today ==
No trace of the station is visible today; it lies between the Silk Road and a Tesco supermarket.
