= Higher Poynton railway station =

Disused railway station in Cheshire, England

Higher Poynton
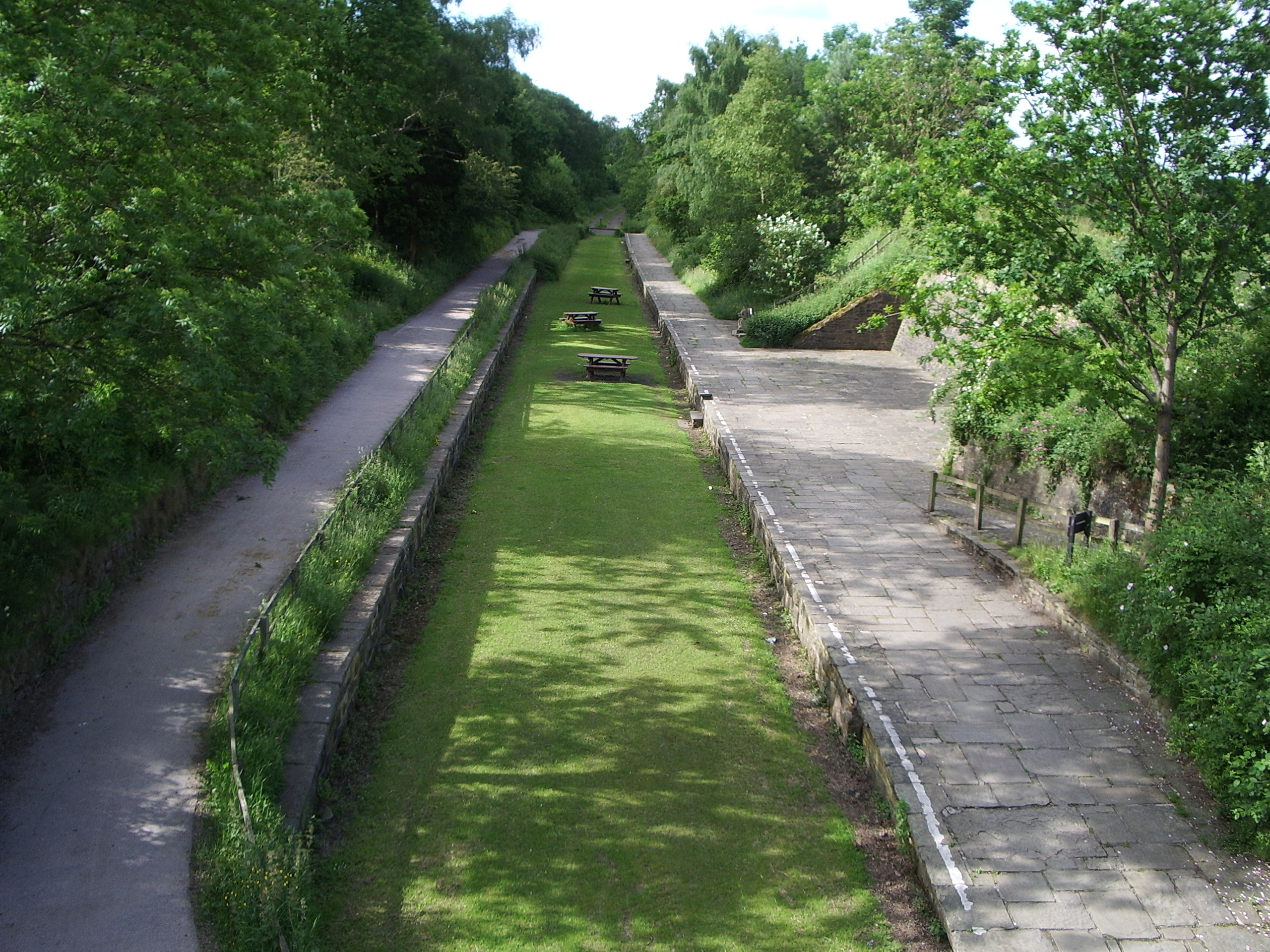
- The site of the former station in 2010

General information
- Location: Poynton, Cheshire East; England
- Coordinates: 53.3467°N 2.0853°W
- Grid reference: SJ944833
- Platforms: 2

Other information
- Status: Disused

History
- Original company: Macclesfield, Bollington and Marple Railway
- Pre-grouping: Macclesfield Committee of the Manchester, Sheffield and Lincolnshire Railway and North Staffordshire Railway
- Post-grouping: Group Committee No. 1 of the London, Midland and Scottish Railway and London and North Eastern Railway

Key dates
- 2 August 1869: Opened as Poynton
- 13 April 1930: Renamed Higher Poynton
- 5 January 1970: Closed
Location

Higher Poynton was a railway station serving the eastern side of the town of Poynton, in Cheshire, England. It was opened in 1869 by the Macclesfield, Bollington and Marple Railway (MB&M), a joint line constructed and operated by the Manchester, Sheffield and Lincolnshire Railway (MS&L) and North Staffordshire Railway (NSR).

== History ==
Initially, the station was known simply as Poynton; however, in some MS&L timetables, it was described as Poynton for Lyme Park.

The station buildings were built to NSR designs, as were most other structures on the MB&M, while train services were operated by the MS&L (later the Great Central Railway).

Much of the goods revenue for the station came from the coal mines and, when these closed in the 1920s, the track on the spur leading off the line to the collieries was lifted.

To avoid confusion with Poynton railway station, on the main line between Manchester Piccadilly and Stoke-on-Trent, the station was renamed Higher Poynton in 1930. During the Second World War, the signal box at Higher Poynton was only operational as required for shunting; most of the time, it remained shut saving the need to employ three signalmen. The station also employed two female porters for the duration of the war and a short period after.

The station closed in January 1970, along with the line between Macclesfield and Rose Hill Marple; the buildings were demolished and the track was lifted by the end of spring 1971.

Preceding station	Disused railways	Following station
Middlewood Higher	Great Central Railway & North Staffordshire Railway; Macclesfield, Bollington and Marple Railway	Bollington

== The site today ==
The trackbed now forms part of the Middlewood Way, a shared-use path between Macclesfield and Manchester; it was opened by David Bellamy in 1985. A car park is located close by and the trackbed is a picnic site; the platforms are extant, which walkers and cyclists use to pass through the former station site.
