= GCR petrol-electric railcar =

GCR railcar introduced in 1912

- In service: 1912-1935
- Manufacturers: British Westinghouse; United Electric Car Company
- Designer: British Westinghouse
- Assembly: Trafford Park, Manchester
- Diagram: 6E4
- Fleet numbers: 51907 (LNER)
- Capacity: 50
- Operators: GCR; LNER
- Depot: Guide Bridge Sidings
- Lines served: London Marylebone Suburban lines; Glossop branch; Macclesfield – Bollington

Specifications
- Car length: 41 ft 7 in (12.7 m)
- Width: 8 ft 8 in (2.6 m)
- Height: 12 ft 2 in (3.7 m)
- Wheel diameter: 2 ft 9 in (840 mm)
- Wheelbase: 33 ft 0 in (10.1 m)
- Maximum speed: 40 mph (64 km/h)
- Weight: 27 LT (27 metric tons)
- Engine type: Petrol
- Cylinder count: 6
- Cylinder size: 140 mm × 156 mm (5.5 in × 6.1 in)
- Power output: 90 hp (67 kW)
- Wheels driven: 4
- Seating: 50 passengers
- Track gauge: 4 ft 8 1/2 in (1,435 mm) standard gauge

The GCR petrol-electric railcar, also informally known as the Bollington Bug, was a 2-bogied motorised coach purchased by the Great Central Railway in 1912 from British Westinghouse of Trafford Park, with the body being built by the United Electric Car Company of Preston. The engine, of an unknown maker, had a power output of 90 hp (67 kW), providing a top speed of 50 mph (80 km/h), although it was only permitted to operate at a maximum speed of 40 mph (64 km/h).

Driving positions were provided at either end of the railcar, with the leading cab being combined with the engine compartment, with notably large, externally mounted sliding doors either side of the engine and an engine silencer on the roof. The railcar could carry up to 50 3rd class passengers, with the seats being built to a similar design seen on trams with reversible backs. The railcar was out-shopped in a GCR Teak livery with gold lining, and cut-out brass lettering of the companies initials, although the railcar would not be numbered under the GCR, only being numbered "51907" in 1923 when it passed into the ownership of the London and North Eastern Railway. It would be withdrawn in 1935.

== Background and Design ==
=== Background ===
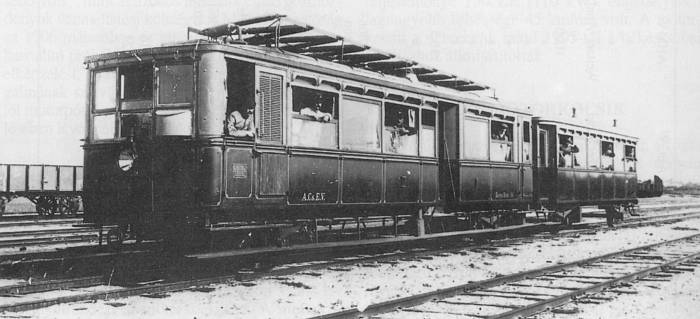
A Weitzer railmotor from Hungary, first built in 1903, and serially from 1905/6

Prior to the purchase of the railcar in 1912, the then General Manager of the GCR, Sam Fay, had been impressed by similar types of petrol-electric railcars operating in Europe at the time, specially ones found in Hungary such as the Weitzer railmotors, which had been first built in 1903, with serial production starting from 1905/6. Alongside this, the North Eastern Railway had also built two Petrol Electric Autocars, with assistance from British Westinghouse, in the form of a Westinghouse multi-dynamo generator. As such, a purchase order was placed with British Westinghouse to construct a petrol-electric railcar for the GCR, with the body being constructed by the United Electric Car Company of Preston, then well known for its tramcars.

=== Design ===
When compared to earlier 1903 Petrol Electric Autocars ordered by the NER, the GCR's railcar is considerably shorter, coming in at 41 ft 7 in (12.7 m), 10 ft (3 m) shorter than the NER Autocars. Despite this, it was able to seat a similar number of passengers, totalling in 50 3rd class seats, 2 less than the Autocars. This also meant it was much lighter, and thus more powerful. The passenger compartments were accessible via a central passenger vestibule, and the seating was of the standard rattan moquette-covered tramcar seating, meaning the backs where also reversible.

The railcar was equipped with driving controls at either end, permitting the railcar to be easily reversed at a terminus. The leading driving compartment was also notably merged with the engine compartment, which itself housed the 6-Cylinder petrol engine, and was able to produce 90 hp (67 kW). The cylinders where housed in water jackets, with the resulting hot water being pumped through a notably large radiator placed on top of the roof in order to be cooled back down. An engine silencer was also positioned on top of the roof, which itself sat over a raised section of roof with ventilation built in. Alongside this, there were also two large, externally mounted sliding doors either side of the engine compartment, giving the railcar a rather unique appearance. The engine was directly connected to a 55 kilowatt D.C. generator, this was then connected to two 64 hp (48 kW) series-wound motors on the rear bogie, which was done in order to balance the weight of the railcar against the considerably large engine at the leading end. The rear motor bogie as such also has a wheelbase of 7 ft 0 in (2 m), whilst the leading bogie was only 5 ft 6 in (2 m).

The voltage supplied to the traction motors, which dictated the maximum speed of the railcar, was done via a Westinghouse tramcar type controller. The main control handle was that of a "dead man's handle", meaning the railcar would lose power and come to a stop if this handle was not held down. In the engine compartment there was also a smaller petrol-electric set which powered the vacuum braking system as well as the railcars lighting. Standard buffing and draw-gear was fitted in order to permit the railcar to be able to haul up to two coaches if required. As for its speed, during trial runs it was able to obtain a top speed of 50 mph (80 km/h), although in service this was capped at 40 mph (64 km/h). The petrol tank it carried was able to hold up to 50 imp gal (227 L; 60 US gal), giving the railcar an operational range of 150 mi (241 km).

The unit was out-shopped in the GCR's Teak coach livery with golden lining, as well as being given cut-out brass lettering in the form of the companies initials, although it would not be given a number.

== Operational History ==
=== Trials ===
It is unknown when the railcar was exactly delivered to the GCR, although it has been noted to have begun trial operations during 1912 in the Manchester area, under supervision of the Electrical Engineer, C.W. Neele. It would then later be noted to have undertaken a press run between London Marylebone and Sudbury Hill Harrow railway station, then known as South Harrow, on 28th March 1912.

=== Service ===
After these trials, it is unknown what occurred with the railcar until 1914, with it presumed to have operated some rush-hour suburban services out of London Marylebone, evidenced by a singular photo of it pulling a 6-wheeled composite coach in the London area. In 1914, the railcar would be moved up to Guide Bridge Sidings, operating between Dinting railway station and Glossop railway station. Here it is noted from drivers that the railcar was not particularly reliable, specially during colder months, when the engine cooling system had to be drained each night.

It would continue operating this route until 1921, when it was moved to Macclesfield to operate a service from its Central station to Bollington railway station, referred to as the "Bollington shuttle", in order to compete against the sudden rise in road traffic after World War I. It would operate this service for the next 14 years, departing empty from Macclesfield at 07:10 am, and arriving at Bollington at 07:23 am to start its weekday service consisting of 12 trips, followed by an extended trip to Romiley railway station at 08:00 pm, arriving at 08:26 pm and returning to Macclesfield by 08:36 pm, which would then be followed by three more trips to Bollington, before returning the Macclesfield at 11:02 pm. During the weekend, it would only operate on Saturdays, which saw it run a trip between Poynton railway station and Macclesfield, leaving at 11:50 am and arriving at 12:05 pm respectively, and then resuming to the default service between Macclesfield and Bollington between 12:18 pm and 03:27 pm. Here it would gain the local nickname of the "Bollington Bug".

In 1923, with the amalgamation of railways across the United Kingdom into the "Big Four", the railcar would pass into the ownership of the London and North Eastern Railway. Here it would retain its GCR Teak livery, though it would finally be numbered, being given the number "51907", and remain on the Bollington Shuttle.

== Withdrawal ==
The railcar would be withdrawn in 1935, being replaced by the newer, but steam driven, Sentinel steam railcar Commerce on the Bollington shuttle service.

== Legacy ==
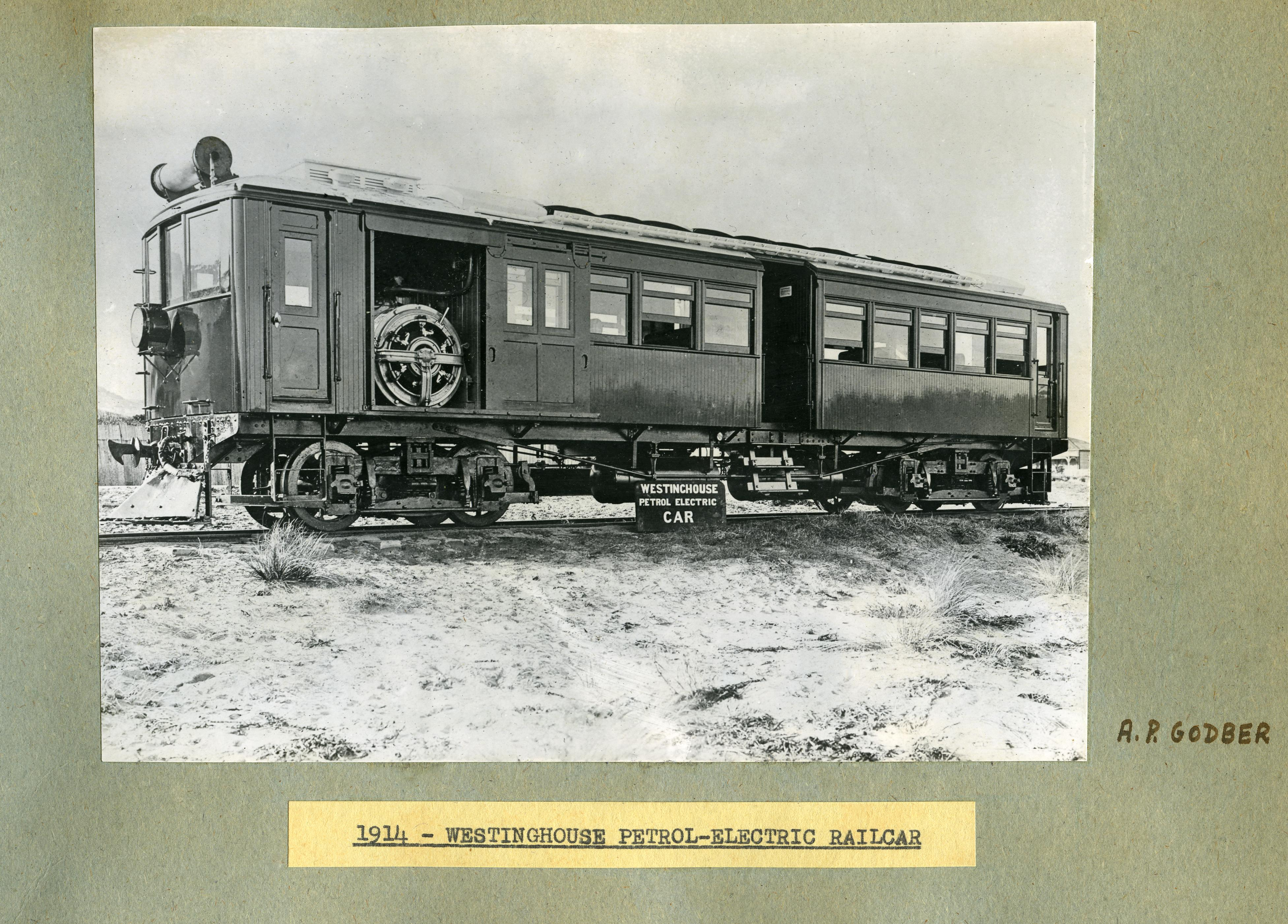
The NZR RM Class experimental railmotor, built by Westinghouse

Not long after the construction of the GCR railcar, British Westinghouse would refine the design for overseas sales, primarily in New Zealand in the form of an experimental NZR RM class railcar, of which bore a similar overall appearance to the GCR's railcar, with notable changes and refinements made. It would also be the first of the experimental NZR RM class railcar to operate in revenue earning service, though similar to the GCR railcar, it was plagued with reliability issues, which saw it withdrawn from service as early as 1917, considerably earlier than its British predecessor.
