= High Lane, Greater Manchester =

Village in Greater Manchester, England

Coordinates: 53.364°N 2.068°W

High Lane
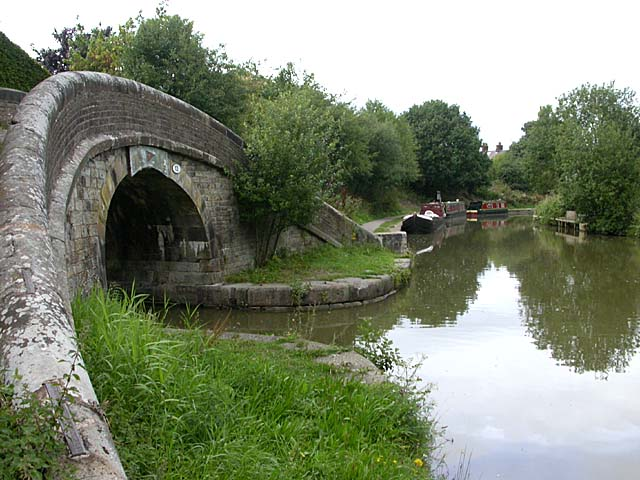
- The bridge over the entrance to the High Lane arm of the Macclesfield Canal in 2003

- Location within Greater Manchester
- Area: 675 km^{2} (261 sq mi)
- Population: 5,852 (2011 census)
  - Density: 9/km^{2} (23/sq mi)
- OS grid reference: SJ955852
- Metropolitan borough: Stockport
- Metropolitan county: Greater Manchester
- Region: North West
- Country: England
- Sovereign state: United Kingdom
- Post town: STOCKPORT
- Postcode district: SK6
- Dialling code: 01663; 0161
- Police: Greater Manchester
- Fire: Greater Manchester
- Ambulance: North West
- UK Parliament: Hazel Grove

High Lane is a village in the Metropolitan Borough of Stockport, Greater Manchester, England. It is sited 5 miles (8 km) south-east of Stockport, on the Macclesfield Canal and the A6 road.

== Governance ==
High Lane lies in the Marple South and High Lane ward of Stockport Metropolitan Borough Council, which is represented by three Liberal Democrat councillors. It forms part the Hazel Grove parliamentary constituency and, since 2024, the Member of Parliament is Lisa Smart of the Liberal Democrats.

== Geography ==
High Lane is 5 miles (8 km) south-east of Stockport. It is bordered by Marple to the north, Hazel Grove to the west, Disley to the east and Poynton to the south. Most of the village is spread along the A6.

High Lane lies in the foothills of the Pennines and on clear days it affords views of the city of Manchester and surrounding towns.

== Demography ==
The population is 5,852, of which 95% are White British; 82% give their religion as Christian and 9.8% have no religion. 64% of the population are economically active; 24% are retired.

Social class:

- Higher managerial and professional – 11%
- Lower managerial and professional – 21%
- Intermediate occupations – 11%
- Small employers and own account workers – 9.6%
- Lower supervisory and technical – 5.3%
- Semi-routine – 8.0%
- Routine – 4.8%
- Never worked and long-term unemployed – 1.3%

== Landmarks ==
There is a Grade II listed war memorial in the centre of the village, close to the church of St Thomas (also Grade II listed). The Old Court House (dated 1772) is one of a few older houses along the main road. At the edge of the village is Wyberslegh Hall. High Lane War Memorial Village Hall lies within High Lane Park, overlooking two junior football pitches.

== Transport ==
The A6 bisects the village, which a major trunk road in England connecting Luton in the south with Carlisle in the north.

Stagecoach Manchester and High Peak Buses operate bus services that serve the village. The main routes are:

- 199: Buxton to Manchester Airport
- 360: Hayfield to Stockport
- 394: Glossop to Stepping Hill Hospital.

The nearest railway station to High Lane is Middlewood, which is on the Buxton line connecting Manchester Piccadilly and Stockport with Buxton. Northern Trains operates a generally hourly service in each directions. The very long Disley Tunnel, on the Hope Valley Line, passes underneath the village.

High Lane railway station served the village on the Macclesfield, Bollington and Marple Railway (MB&MR), which connected Rose Hill Marple with Macclesfield. It was closed, as part of the Beeching cuts, in January 1970. The former trackbed now forms the Middlewood Way, a shared-use path which is accessible from the A6.

The Macclesfield Canal passes through High Lane. It runs for 26.1 miles (42 km) in a generally north to south direction from Marple Junction at Marple, where it joins the Upper Peak Forest Canal, to a junction with the Hall Green Branch of the Trent and Mersey Canal at Hall Green stop lock. The 964-foot (294 m) High Lane Arm of the Macclesfield Canal is home to the North Cheshire Cruising Club. The Arm had historically extended south 600-foot (180 m) to the Middlewood coal mine.

== Education ==
High Lane has two primary schools: High Lane Primary School and Brookside Primary School.

== Religious sites ==
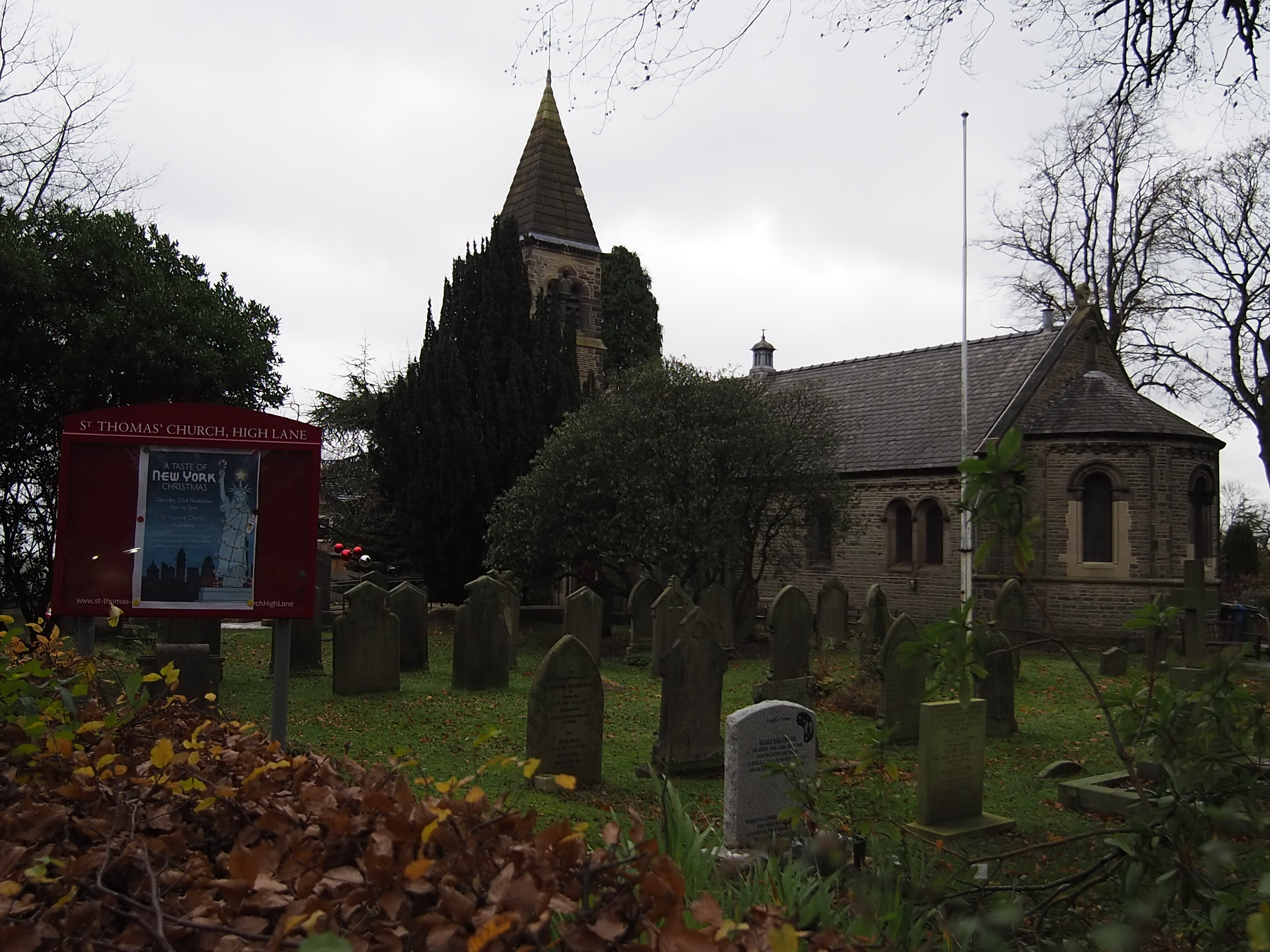
The church of St Thomas in 2019

- St Thomas' Church – Anglican. Built 1851; consecrated 1859; enlarged 1866. It was built in a modern Norman style and is now Grade II listed.
- Windlehurst Methodist Church – Methodist.

== Public services ==
There are three parks in High Lane:

- Brookside Park
- Windlehurst Park, which is known to many locals as "the little park"
- High Lane Park is the largest of the three; in 2000, it had a small skatepark installed. In the summer of 2010, renovations were completed and an extension to the children's play area was constructed.

== Notable residents ==
- John Bradshaw (1602–1659) President of the High Court of Justice (Judge) for the trial of Charles I in 1649. Lord President of the Council of State of the English Commonwealth in 1649–51, 1653
- Christopher Isherwood – novelist, playwright, screenwriter, autobiographer, and diarist
- Daniel Pepper – Paralympian swimmer
- Christopher Samba – former Blackburn Rovers football club captain
- Sir Nicholas Winstanley – author and priest.

== See also ==
- Listed buildings in Marple, Greater Manchester
