= Middlewood Higher railway station =

Former railway station in Cheshire, England

Middlewood Higher
- A view of the station, c.1962

General information
- Location: High Lane, Stockport, Greater Manchester; England
- Coordinates: 53.3599°N 2.0838°W
- Grid reference: SJ945847
- Platforms: 2

Other information
- Status: Disused

History
- Original company: Macclesfield, Bollington and Marple Railway
- Pre-grouping: Macclesfield Committee of the Manchester, Sheffield and Lincolnshire Railway and North Staffordshire Railway
- Post-grouping: Group Committee No. 1 of the London, Midland and Scottish Railway and London and North Eastern Railway

Key dates
- 2 June 1879: Opened as Middlewood
- 25 July 1951: Renamed Middlewood Higher
- 7 November 1960: Closed
Location

Middlewood Higher was a railway station near High Lane in Cheshire (now in Greater Manchester), England. It was opened in 1879 by the Macclesfield, Bollington and Marple Railway (MB&M), a joint line constructed and operated by the Manchester, Sheffield and Lincolnshire Railway (MS&L) and North Staffordshire Railway (NSR).

== History ==
The station owed its existence to the desire to create an interchange between the MB&M and the London and North Western Railway (LNWR) route between Stockport and Buxton. Without the interchange, people wishing to travel between Macclesfield and Buxton had to travel to Stockport to change trains and then travel back on themselves to get to Buxton. The board of the MB&M proposed to the LNWR that both companies should open a station where the two lines crossed at Middlewood, to allow passengers to save a considerable distance and time in their travel; the LNWR agreed and both the MB&M station, known simply as Middlewood, and the LNWR's Middlewood for Norbury station opened on 2 June 1879. They were connected by a flight of steps.

While this allowed for passenger interchange, the layout did not allow for goods interchange and, in 1882, discussion started on connecting the two lines by a rail link. The NSR and the LNWR agreed terms, but the MS&L could not agree running powers with the LNWR, so the NSR and LNWR agreed to proceed on their own. The resulting section of line, known as the Middlewood Curve, opened on 20 May 1885. Most train services on the MB&M were run using MS&L engines and rolling stock but, because of the running power agreement, services between Macclesfield and Buxton were provided by the NSR.

The station buildings, including the platforms, were all of timber construction and was built on an embankment. This made it susceptible to subsidence and landslips. In 1955, part of the down platform (towards Manchester London Road) and the waiting shelter were lost when the embankment collapsed. As the usage of the station was low, replacing the lost section was considered uneconomic and reconstruction was not carried out.

As the station served a sparsely populated area, and there were two other stations (Higher Poynton and High Lane) close by, the number of people using Middlewood Higher (as it had been renamed in 1951) was low and so, after consultation, the station closed in November 1960.

When all of the MB&M closed in January 1970, the track was lifted, although the bridge across the Buxton line remains.

Preceding station	Disused railways	Following station
High Lane; Line and station closed	Great Central Railway & North Staffordshire Railway; Macclesfield, Bollington and Marple Railway	Higher Poynton; Line and station closed

== The site today ==
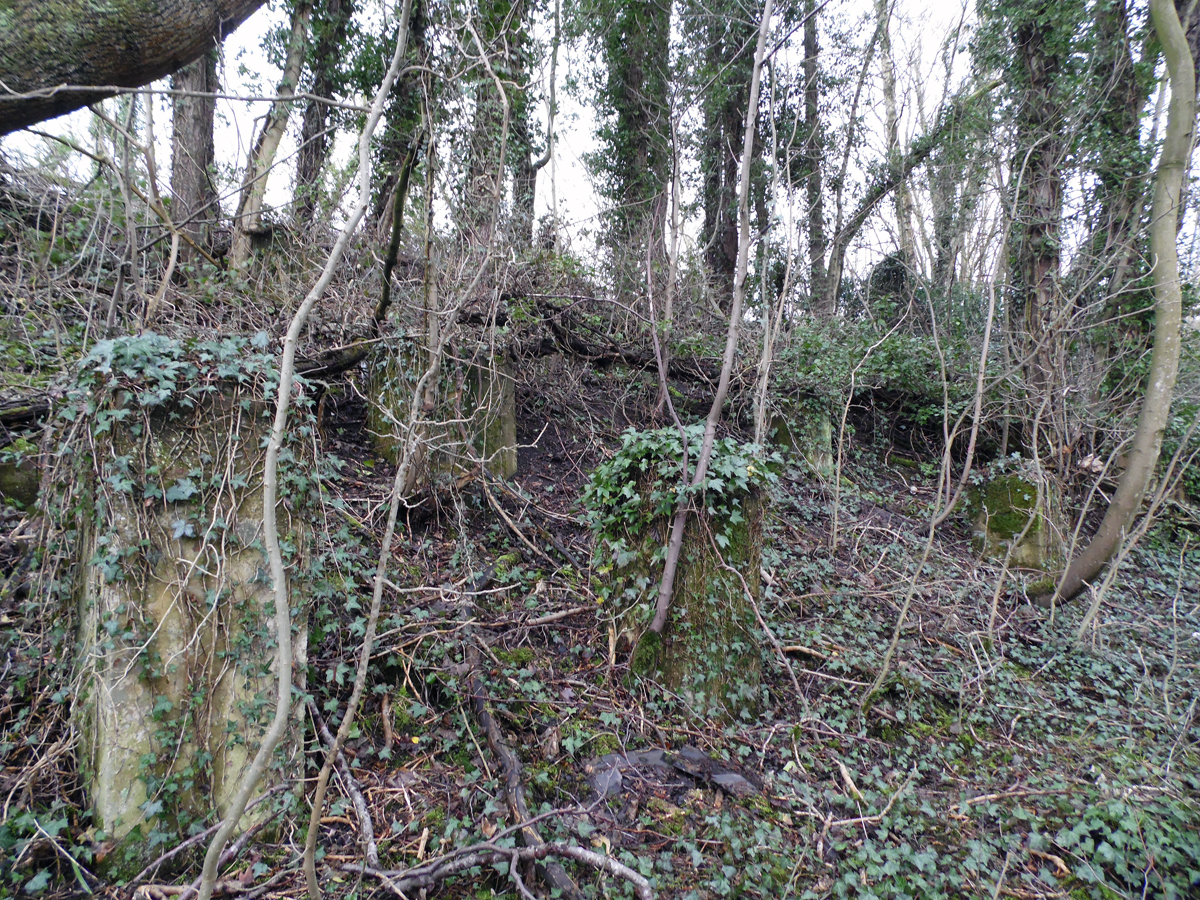
Building support pillars at the site of the former station, March 2019

Although the station buildings are long since gone, some remains of the support pillars for both sides of the station are extant.

The trackbed now forms part of the Middlewood Way, a shared-use path between Macclesfield and Marple.
