= High Lane railway station =

Disused railway station in Greater Manchester, England

High Lane
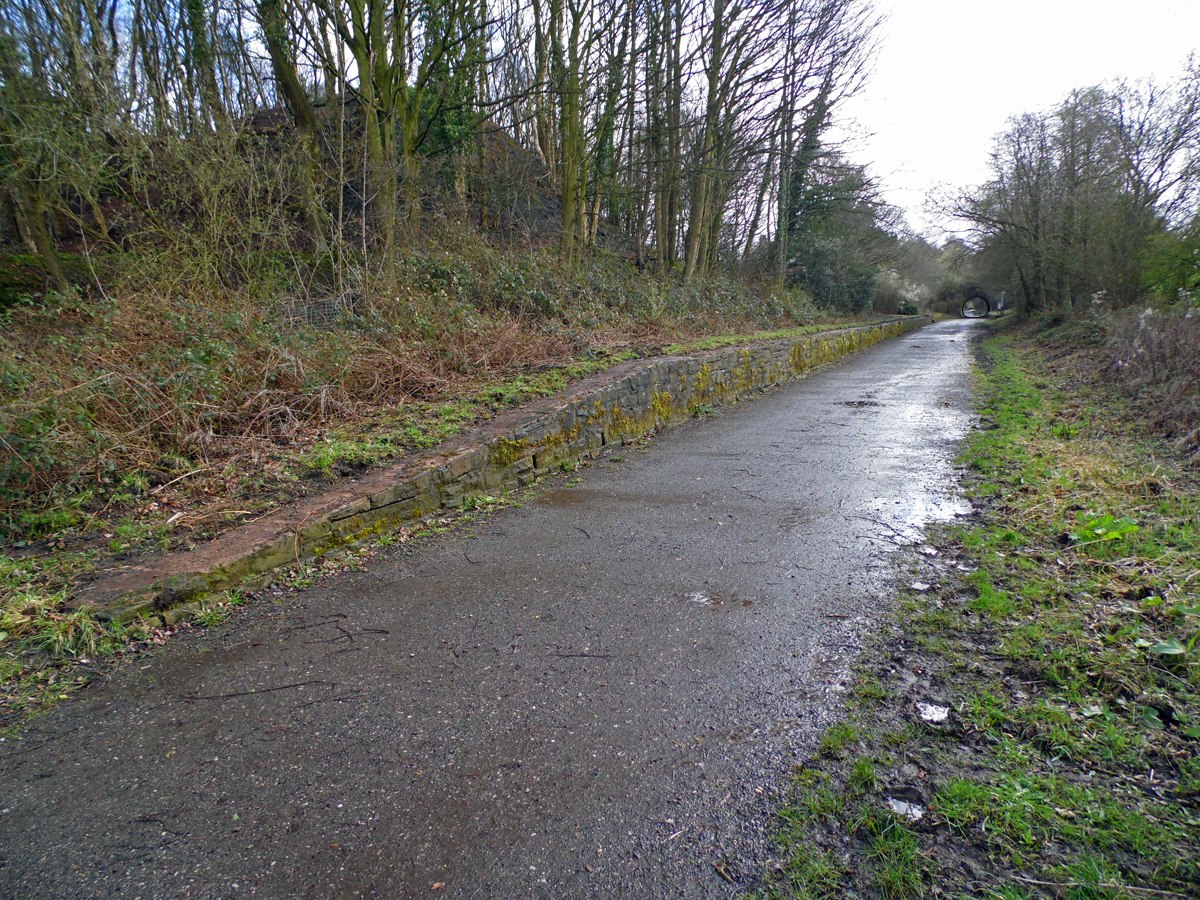
- The site of the former station, March 2015

General information
- Location: High Lane, Stockport; England
- Coordinates: 53.3677°N 2.0851°W
- Grid reference: SJ944856
- Platforms: 2

Other information
- Status: Disused

History
- Original company: Macclesfield, Bollington and Marple Railway
- Pre-grouping: Macclesfield Committee of the Manchester, Sheffield and Lincolnshire Railway and North Staffordshire Railway
- Post-grouping: Group Committee No. 1 of the London, Midland and Scottish Railway and London and North Eastern Railway

Key dates
- 2 August 1869: Opened
- 5 January 1970: Closed
Location

High Lane railway station served the village of High Lane in Greater Manchester, England. It was a stop on the Macclesfield, Bollington and Marple Railway (MB&MR).

== History ==
The station was opened in August 1869 by the Macclesfield, Bollington and Marple Railway (MB&M), which was a joint line constructed and operated by the Manchester, Sheffield and Lincolnshire Railway (MS&L) and North Staffordshire Railway (NSR).

Like the other stations on the MB&M, the station buildings and signalling were provided by the NSR and train services by the MS&L.

The station closed in January 1970, along with the entirety of the MB&M. The track was lifted in the following year.

Preceding station	Disused railways	Following station
Rose Hill Marple	Great Central Railway & North Staffordshire Railway; Macclesfield, Bollington and Marple Railway	Middlewood Higher

== The site today ==
Both platforms are extant, although the buildings have been demolished. The former trackbed now forms part of the Middlewood Way, a shared-use path between Macclesfield and Rose Hill Marple.
