= Middlewood railway station =

Railway station in Greater Manchester, England

Coordinates: 53.360°N 2.083°W

Middlewood
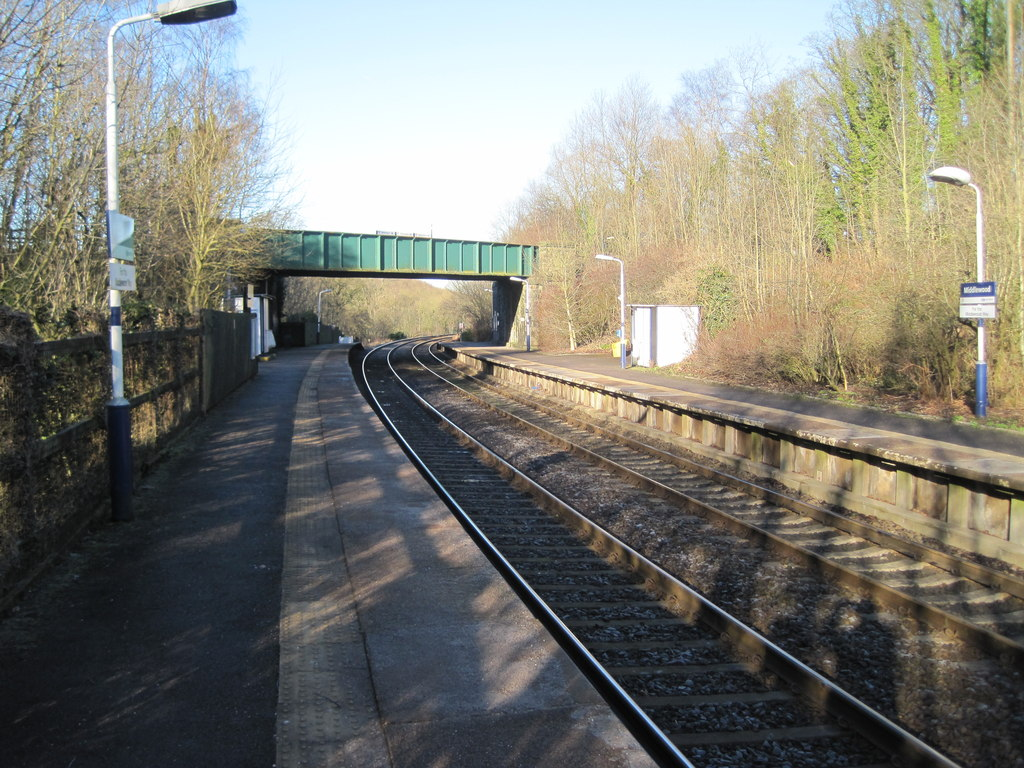
- The station in 2013

General information
- Location: High Lane, Metropolitan Borough of Stockport; England
- Grid reference: SJ945848
- Manager: Northern
- Transit authority: Transport for Greater Manchester
- Platforms: 2

Other information
- Station code: MDL
- Classification: DfT category F2

History
- Original company: London and North Western Railway

Key dates
- 2 June 1879: Opened as Middlewood for Norbury
- 1 July 1899: Renamed Middlewood for High Lane
- 25 July 1951: Renamed Middlewood Lower
- 6 May 1968: Renamed Middlewood

Passengers
- 2021/22: ▲21,116
- 2022/23: ▼18,758
- 2023/24: ▲19,218
- 2024/25: ▲21,278
- 2025/26: ▲29,108
Location
Notes
- Passenger statistics from the Office of Rail and Road

Middlewood railway station serves the villages of High Lane in the Metropolitan Borough of Stockport, Greater Manchester, and Middlewood, near Poynton in the Cheshire East district of England. It is on the Buxton Line between Manchester Piccadilly, Stockport and Buxton. The station is managed and served by Northern Trains; it is the last station on the line within the Transport for Greater Manchester ticketing area.

There is no vehicular access to the station. Access is only by woodland paths, with the nearest road (Middlewood Road) being some 300 yards (270 m) away on foot. It is one of the three stations that provide access to the Middlewood Way rail trail.

== History ==
The station was opened in 1879 by the London and North Western Railway on the Stockport, Disley and Whaley Bridge Railway, which they had acquired in 1866. The construction and opening of the station was concurrent with the construction and opening of the adjacent Middlewood Higher station on the Macclesfield, Bollington and Marple Railway to provide an interchange for passengers wishing to travel between Macclesfield and Buxton with the two stations linked by a flight of steps. Originally called Middlewood for Norbury, the station was renamed three times. In 1899, it became Middlewood for High Lane; then it was retitled Middlewood Lower in 1951, before becoming simply Middlewood in 1968.

In July 2009, Poynton Town Council announced their intention to install a bicycle rack and improve signage in and around the station, partly funded with the aid of a grant from the High Peak and Hope Valley Community Rail Partnership. These improvements were implemented, along with the installation of additional lighting, a new PA system and a Hearing Induction Loop.

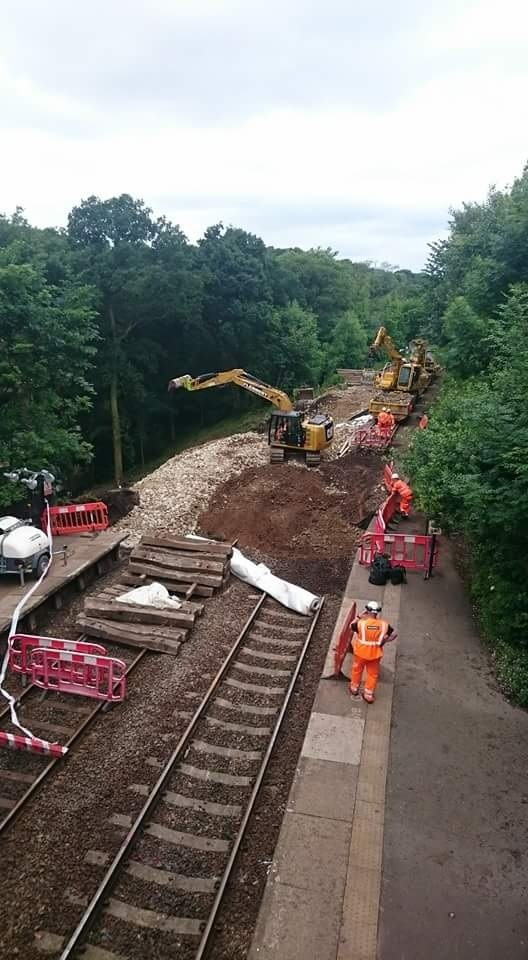
Work to repair the 2016 landslip just past the station's platforms

In June 2016, a landslip at the station following heavy rain meant that all services were suspended between Hazel Grove and Buxton until 25 June. Parts of the track and platform were both affected.

== Service ==
There is generally a two-hourly service in each direction, Mondays-Sundays; services run to Manchester Piccadilly northbound and to Buxton southbound. There are additional services at peak periods. Other trains pass through the station without stopping.

Preceding station	National Rail	Following station
Hazel Grove	Northern Trains Buxton line	Disley
