= Macclesfield (ship) =

Several vessels have been named Macclesfield for Macclesfield, or the Earl of Macclesfield:

- Macclesfield (1699 ship) was a galley or "frigate" that the British East India Company (EIC) hired in 1699. She made two voyages for the EIC, the first to China (Canton), and the second to Bombay.
- Macclesfield (1720 EIC ship) was launched in October 1720 on the River Thames. She made four voyages for the British East India Company (EIC) before she was sold in 1732.
- Macclesfield was a hired armed ship that served the Royal Navy between 1756 and 1758.
- Macclesfield (1803 ship) was launched at Lancaster in 1803. She made three voyages as a slave ship in the triangular trade in enslaved people. After the end of British participation in the trans-Atlantic slave trade she became a West Indiaman. She was wrecked in 1809.
- SS Macclesfield

== See also ==
- Macclesfield (disambiguation)
