= Middlewood Way =

Rail trail in Greater Manchester and Cheshire, England

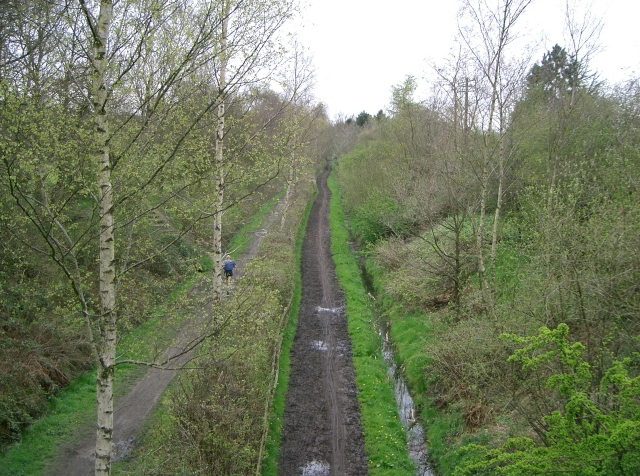
- A typical view of the Middlewood Way, on the Marple-Bollington section, with separate tracks for walkers and horses
- Length: 10 mi (16 km)
- Location: Greater Manchester and Cheshire, England
- Designation: Shared-use path
- Trailheads: Rose Hill Marple – Macclesfield
- Use: Walking, hiking, running, cycling and horseriding

The Middlewood Way is a ten-mile (16.1 km) shared-use path in north-west England, between Rose Hill Marple, in Greater Manchester, and Macclesfield, in Cheshire; it was opened on 30 May 1985 by Dr David Bellamy. It serves the needs of walkers, dog walkers, cyclists, joggers and horse riders, hosting a wide range of flora and fauna. The management of the length of the Middlewood Way is shared between Stockport Metropolitan Borough Council and Cheshire East Council's Countryside Ranger Service.

== Railway history ==
The Middlewood Way follows the route of the former Macclesfield, Bollington and Marple railway, which had operated between 1869 and 1970. This section of railway connected Macclesfield and Rose Hill Marple, with trains continuing on to Manchester London Road. The railway played a significant role in transporting goods, particularly cotton and coal, and provided passenger services connecting Macclesfield to Marple.

Initially, there were five stations on the line: Marple (Rose Hill), High Lane, Higher Poynton, Bollington and Macclesfield. In 1879, a new station was opened at Middlewood; it was later renamed Middlewood Higher, where the line crossed over Middlewood Lower on the Buxton line.

On 5 January 1970, the section between Rose Hill Marple and Macclesfield was closed to all traffic, as part of the Beeching cuts; the track was lifted in early 1971. Only Rose Hill Marple station remained in operation, due to the high number of passengers commuting to Manchester Piccadilly; the station is now a single-tracked terminus for a spur off the Hope Valley Line.

Recognising the potential for recreational use, Cheshire County Council converted the disused railway line into the Middlewood Way in 1985, creating a green corridor that preserved the area's natural and industrial heritage.

== Route ==
The path runs approximately parallel to the Macclesfield Canal, passing through High Lane, Higher Poynton and Bollington. It can be reached by National Rail services at Rose Hill Marple, Middlewood and Macclesfield, via the Goyt Valley Connect 2 scheme.

The trail forms part of National Cycle Network Route 55 between Ironbridge and Preston.

Key access points and features along the route include:

- Rose Hill Marple: (Note: Rose Hill Marple station's location: 53.3950°N 2.0774°W) The northern terminus, offering access to Marple and the Peak Forest Canal; there are regular railway services on the Hope Valley Line to Manchester Piccadilly
- High Lane: Features a disused railway station and a picnic site; the A6 crosses over the line
- Middlewood: Access to the Ladybrook Valley Interest Trail; Middlewood station, on the Buxton Line, provides services between Manchester Piccadilly, Stockport and Buxton
- Higher Poynton: Features a disused railway station, a picnic site, a café, a public house and access to the Macclesfield Canal; there is also a car park at Nelson's Pit
- Bollington: A historic mill town, home to the iconic White Nancy monument and several industrial heritage sites; the Macclesfield Canal passes by the old station site
- Macclesfield: (Note: Macclesfield station's location: 53.2601°N 2.1229°W) The southern terminus, connecting to National Rail services, the wider network of trails and the Silk Road.

The route is mostly flat, making it suitable for users of varying abilities. It traverses woodlands, meadows and farmland, providing a peaceful escape and opportunities to enjoy local wildlife.

== Cultural and historical significance ==
In addition to its natural beauty, the Middlewood Way is a reminder of the region’s industrial past. Structures, such as old railway bridges, station buildings and remnants of sidings, can be seen along the route which add a historical dimension to its appeal. The trail passes through Bollington, nicknamed Happy Valley, which is known for its rich textile heritage.

== Gallery ==
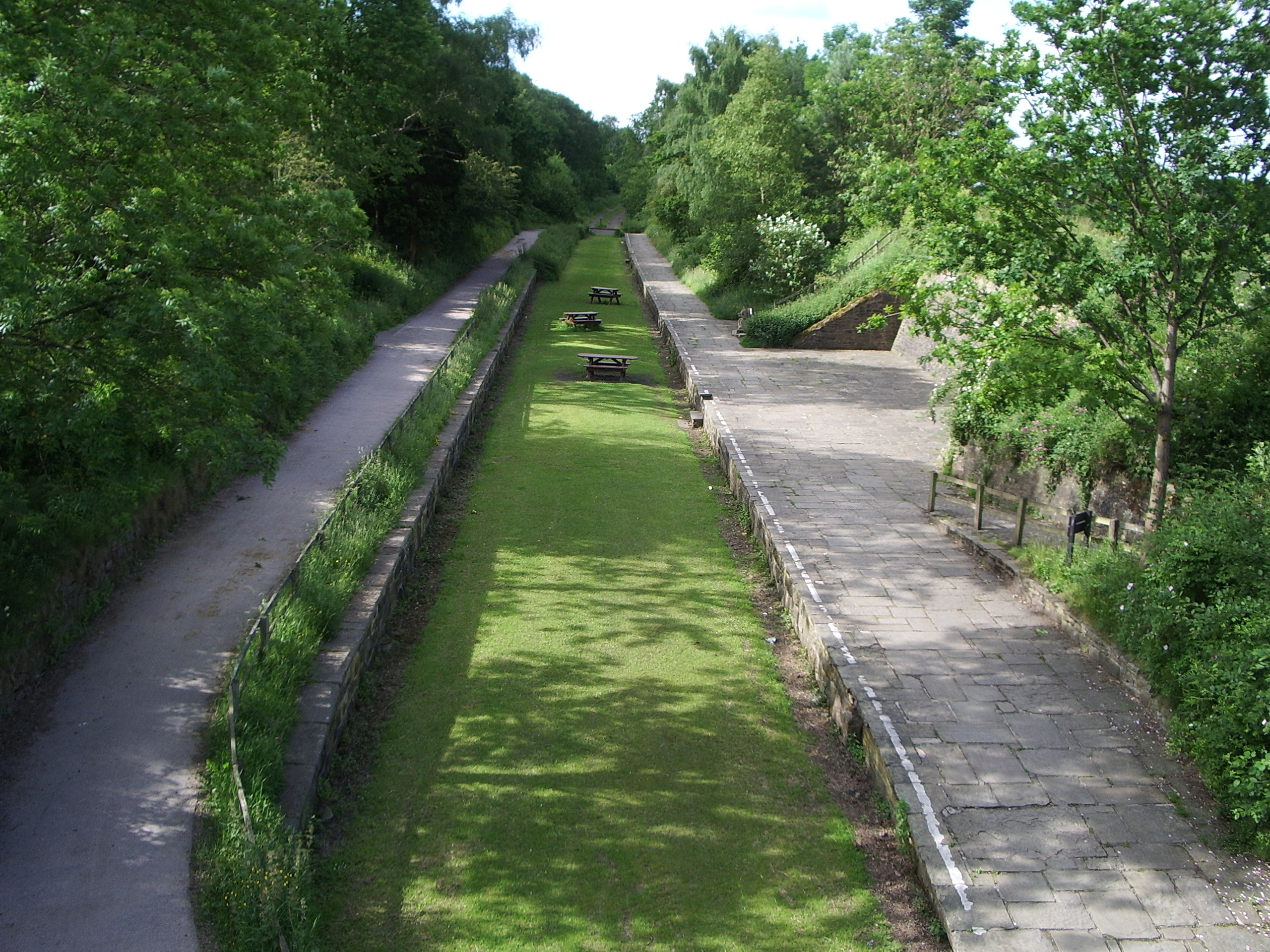
The old station platforms at Higher Poynton

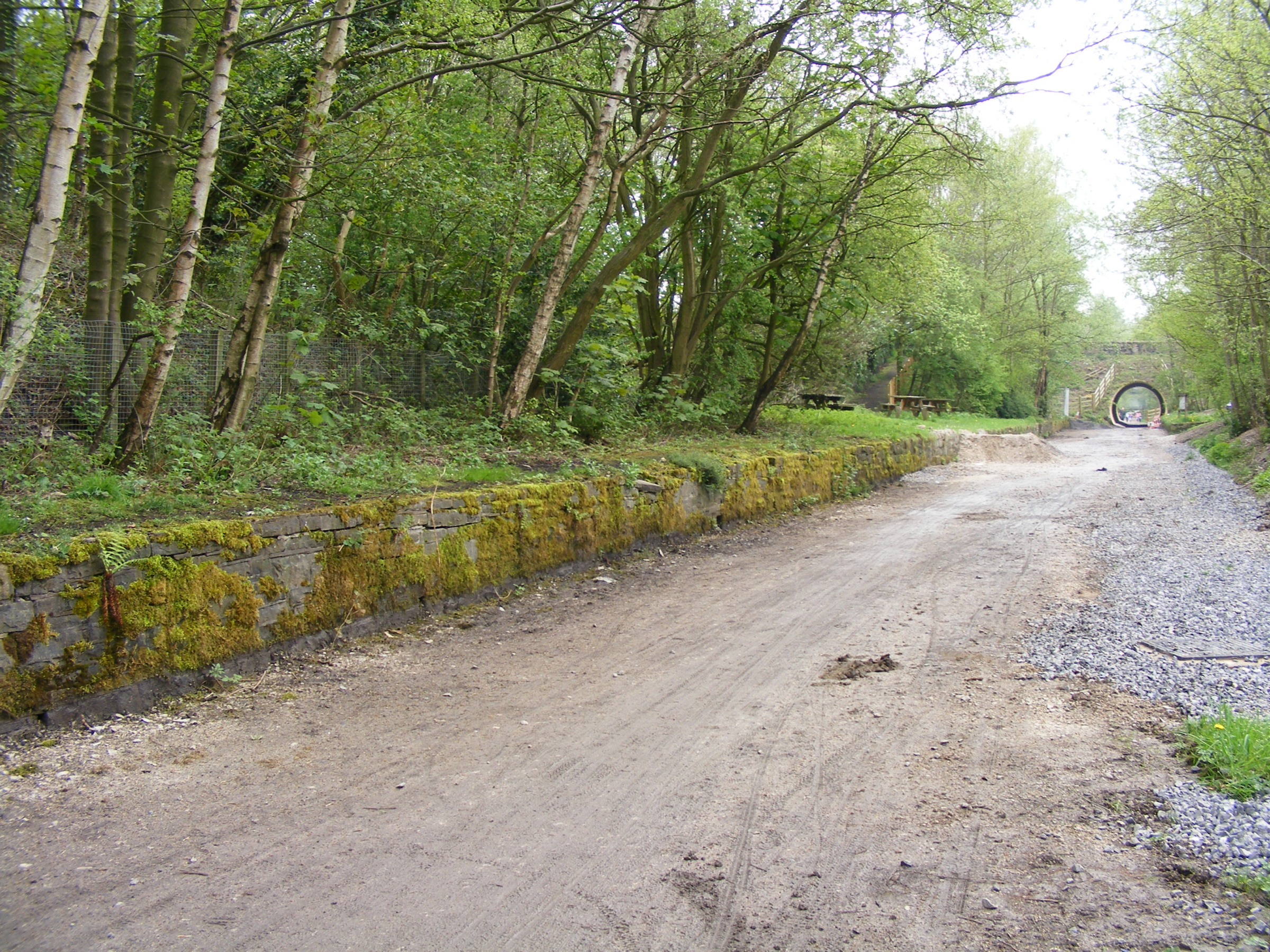
The old station at High Lane, with the A6 bridge in the background

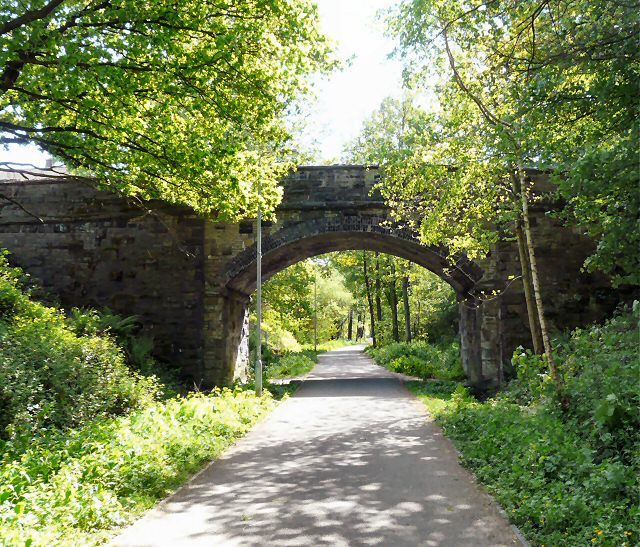
The path in summer

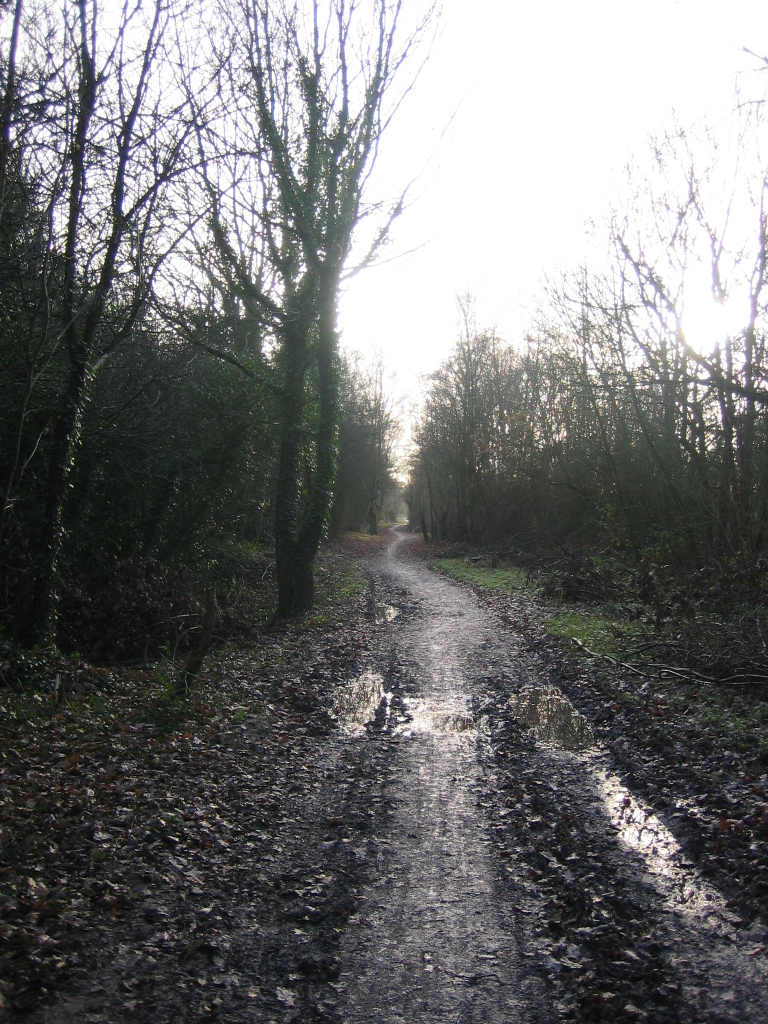
The path in winter.

== See also ==
- Recreational walks in Cheshire
