= Macclesfield (disambiguation) =

Macclesfield is a market town in Cheshire, England.

Macclesfield may also refer to:

- Macclesfield (UK Parliament constituency), a constituency represented in the British House of Commons
- Macclesfield (borough), a local government district and borough in Cheshire, England
- Macclesfield, South Australia, a town in the Adelaide Hills area of South Australia
- Macclesfield, Victoria, another town in Australia
- Macclesfield Bank or Zhongsha Islands is an elongated sunken atoll of underwater reefs and shoals in South China Sea and part of the disputed South China Sea Islands
- Macclesfield, North Carolina, a town in eastern North Carolina, U.S.A.
- William of Macclesfield, English cleric
- Macclesfield, a plantation in Isle of Wight County, Virginia that belonged to Josiah Parker

== See also ==
- Macclesfield railway station (disambiguation)
- Macclesfield (ship) – any one of several vessels by that name
- Earl of Macclesfield
- Macclesfield Town F.C., an English football club in Cheshire
