= Macclesfield Hibel Road railway station =

Former railway station in Cheshire, England

Macclesfield Hibel Road
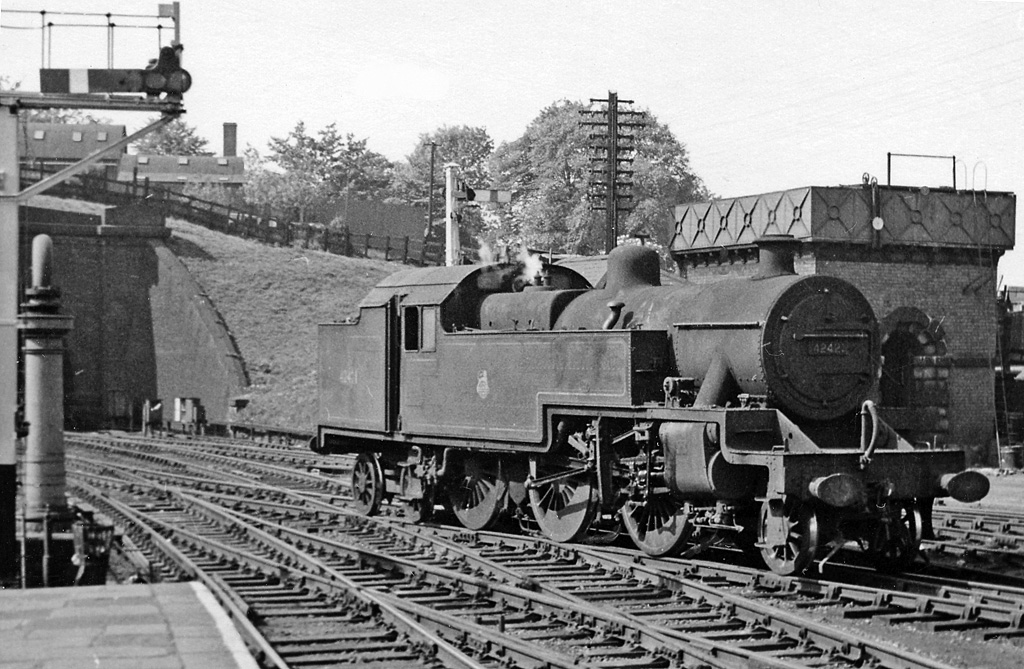
- View northward towards Stockport and Manchester, in 1959

General information
- Location: Macclesfield, Cheshire East; England
- Coordinates: 53.263931°N 2.124154°W
- Grid reference: SJ918741
- Platforms: 3

Other information
- Status: Disused

History
- Original company: North Staffordshire Railway and London and North Western Railway
- Post-grouping: London, Midland and Scottish Railway

Key dates
- 13 July 1849: Opened
- 7 November 1960: Closed
Location

Macclesfield Hibel Road railway station served the town of Macclesfield, in Cheshire, England, between 1849 and 1960.

== History ==
It was opened as a joint station by the North Staffordshire Railway (NSR) and the London and North Western Railway (LNWR) on 13 July 1849, with the opening of the NSR route to Uttoxeter via North Rode and Leek and it replaced an earlier, temporary LNWR station at Beech Bridge. Built right at the point where the track of the two companies made an end-on junction, the station was managed by a joint committee of the two companies.

With the opening of the Macclesfield, Bollington and Marple Railway in 1871, the NSR opened a new station less than 500 yards (457 m) further south called Macclesfield Central. It had been hoped that the new line could run into Hibel Road, but the LNWR objected to this and neither would the LNWR agree to share Central station.

Both stations remained open until 1960, when the decision was taken by British Railways to concentrate services on a redeveloped Central station. The refurbished Central station, now renamed simply Macclesfield, opened on 7 November 1960; the same day that Hibel Road closed.

=== Passenger services ===
LNWR services to/from Manchester London Road terminated at Hibel Road but, if they continued to Stoke-on-Trent via Congleton, then many stopped at Central too. NSR services, either on the main line to Stoke or via the Churnet Valley line, used both stations. Express trains between London Euston and Manchester London Road tended only to use Hibel Road.

=== Freight traffic ===
The area around the station was very cramped. To the south of the station was the NSR goods yard, which dealt mostly with coal for Macclesfield gas works. North of the station was the LNWR goods yard and NSR's motive power depot. As the track north of the station was LNWR owned, the NSR could only access its engine shed using running powers over the LNWR track.

Preceding station	Disused railways	Following station
Prestbury; LNWR	LNWR/NSR	Macclesfield Central; NSR

== The site today ==
The station was demolished and the site has now been redeveloped.
