= Macclesfield (1720 EIC ship) =

British East India Company ship 1720–1732

History

Great Britain
- Name: Macclesfield
- Namesake: Macclesfield, or the Earl of Macclesfield
- Owner: 1720: Robert Hudson; 1726: Dodding Bradyll
- Operator: British East India Company
- Launched: October 1720, Thames
- Fate: Sold 1732

General characteristics
- Tons burthen: 450, or 475 (bm)
- Complement: 90
- Armament: 30 guns

Macclesfield was launched in October 1720 on the River Thames. She made four voyages for the British East India Company (EIC) before she was sold in 1732.

== Career ==
1st EIC voyage (1721–1722): Captain Robert Hudson sailed from the Downs on 4 February 1721, bound for China. She reached Batavia on 20 June and arrived at Whampoa Anchorage on 24 July. On her way she sighted Macclesfield (or La Paix Rock). Homeward bound, she reached Mew Island (an island in Mew Bay, about two miles east of Tanjung Layar), on 16 December, and St Helena on 25 February 1722. She arrived back at the Downs on 19 May.

2nd EIC voyage (1724-1725): Captain Hudson sailed from the Downs on 29 January 1724, bound for China and Madras. Macclesfield reached Batavia on 10 June, and arrived at Whampoa on 27 July. On her return voyage, she was at Malacca on 7 December, and Madras on 26 December. She reached St Helena on 17 May 1725 and arrived at the Downs on 9 August.

3rd EIC voyage (1727–1729): Captain Hudson sailed on 20 December 1827, bound for China, and returned on 25 May 1729.

4th EIC voyage (1730–1732): Captain Hudson sailed from the Downs on 13 December 1730, bound for China. She reached Bantam on 25 April 1731, and arrived at Whampoa on 26 July. She reached Mew Bay on 11 January 1732 and St Helena on 8 March. She arrived back at the Downs on 2 June.

== Fate ==
Macclesfield was sold on 31 August 1732 at Lloyd's Coffee House.
