= Bollington railway station =

Former railway station in Cheshire, England

Bollington
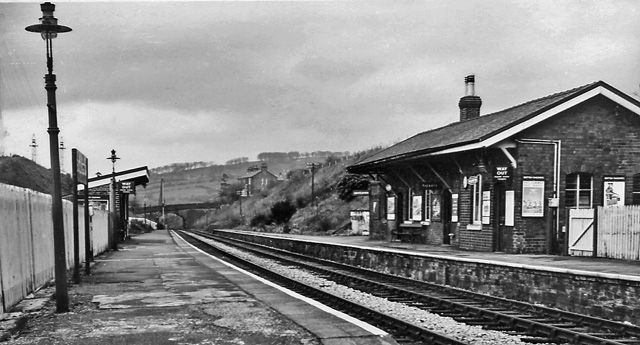
- View northward towards Manchester, 1965

General information
- Location: Bollington, Cheshire East; England
- Coordinates: 53.2934°N 2.1080°W
- Grid reference: SJ929774
- Platforms: 2

Other information
- Status: Disused

History
- Original company: Macclesfield, Bollington and Marple Railway
- Pre-grouping: Macclesfield Committee of the Manchester, Sheffield and Lincolnshire Railway and North Staffordshire Railway
- Post-grouping: Group Committee No. 1 of the London, Midland and Scottish Railway and London and North Eastern Railway

Key dates
- 2 August 1869: Opened
- 5 January 1970: Closed
Location

Bollington railway station served the town of Bollington, in Cheshire, England. It was opened in 1869 by the Macclesfield, Bollington and Marple Railway (MB&M), a joint line constructed and operated by the Manchester, Sheffield and Lincolnshire Railway (MS&L) and North Staffordshire Railway (NSR). The passenger station was sited on the north side of Grimshaw Lane, with a goods yard on the south side.

== History ==
Initially, services ran between Macclesfield and Rose Hill Marple, but this was soon extended so that direct trains ran between Macclesfield and Manchester London Road. A number of additional services were supplied between Bollington and Macclesfield, as a significant number of Macclesfield workers lived in Bollington. In 1921, there were 14 additional shuttle services between the two towns using a petrol railcar purchased by the Great Central Railway (GCR) (successor to the MS&L); it was nicknamed the Bollington Bug. The Bug was replaced in 1935 by a Sentinel steam railcar that ran the shuttle service, until it was withdrawn at the start of 1939.

The station buildings were built to NSR designs, as were most other structures on the MB&M, while most train services were operated by the MS&L and later the GCR; an exception to this being the NSR Summer Saturday services between Macclesfield and Buxton.

The station closed in January 1970, along with the line between Macclesfield and Marple; the buildings were demolished and the track was lifted by the end of 1971.

Preceding station	Disused railways	Following station
Higher Poynton	Great Central Railway & North Staffordshire Railway; Macclesfield, Bollington and Marple Railway	Macclesfield

== The site today ==
The former trackbed now forms part of the Middlewood Way, a shared-use path between Macclesfield and Marple. Part of the goods station site provides a car park for the path.
