= Rose Hill Marple railway station =

Railway station in Greater Manchester, England

Rose Hill Marple
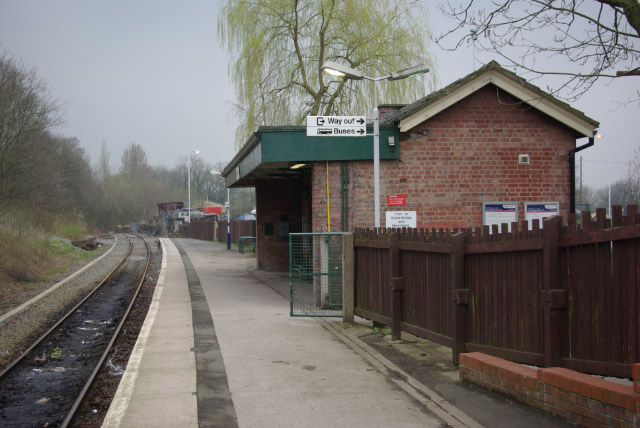
- View looking toward the buffer stop. Prior to 1970, the line continued south towards Macclesfield.

General information
- Location: Marple, Stockport, England
- Coordinates: 53.3951°N 2.0766°W
- Grid reference: SJ950887
- Manager: Northern Trains
- Transit authority: Transport for Greater Manchester
- Platforms: 1

Other information
- Station code: RSH
- Classification: DfT category E

History
- Original company: Macclesfield, Bollington and Marple Railway
- Pre-grouping: Macclesfield Committee (GCR & NSR)
- Post-grouping: Macclesfield Committee (LMS & LNER)

Key dates
- 2 August 1869: Opened as Marple (Rose Hill)
- ?: Renamed Rose Hill (Marple)
- ?: Renamed Rose Hill Marple

Passengers
- 2020/21: ▼26,124
- 2021/22: ▲83,720
- 2022/23: ▲99,900
- 2023/24: ▼99,192
- 2024/25: ▲0.120 million
Location
Notes
- Passenger statistics from the Office of Rail and Road

Rose Hill Marple is one of two railway stations that serve the town of Marple, in the Metropolitan Borough of Stockport, Greater Manchester, England; the other is Marple. The station, which opened in 1869, is the last surviving stop on the former Macclesfield, Bollington and Marple Railway (MB&MR). It is connected via a short branch to the Hope Valley Line. The original line to Macclesfield was closed in January 1970, leaving Rose Hill Marple as the terminus of the route; the Middlewood Way, a shared-use path, now follows the preserved route of the disused MB&MR.

== History ==
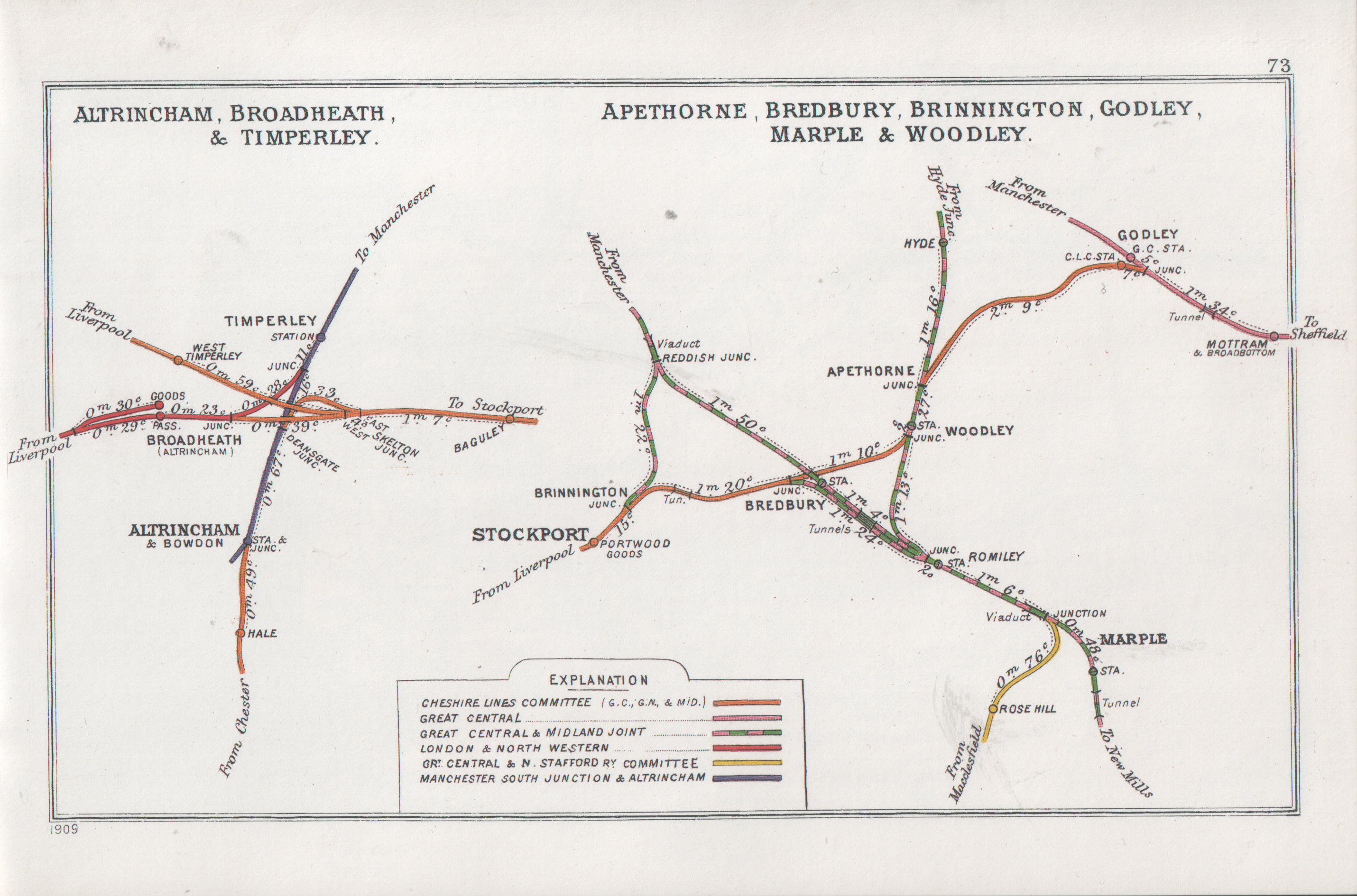
A 1909 Railway Clearing House junction diagram showing (right) railways in the vicinity of Rose Hill (lower right, in yellow)

The station opened on 2 August 1869. Originally named Marple (Rose Hill), it was later renamed Rose Hill (Marple), before the current form Rose Hill Marple was adopted.

It was built on the Macclesfield, Bollington and Marple Railway, with dual tracks and two platforms. The second southbound platform had a waiting shelter. The remaining station building previously provided an indoor waiting area and was only recently brought back into use in 2007, with a new ticket window operating on weekday mornings.

On 5 January 1970, the route south to Bollington and Macclesfield was closed to all traffic; the majority of travellers between Macclesfield and Manchester Piccadilly preferred to use the faster West Coast Main Line route via Stockport instead. Though it had also been listed for closure in the 1963 Beeching Report, Rose Hill itself avoided a similar fate due to its high levels of commuter traffic towards Manchester Piccadilly. The second platform was removed subsequently, as the spur to the main Hope Valley Line is now operated as a single track.

Subsequent diesel services to and from Manchester Piccadilly originally alternated between the two available routes: one train running via Bredbury, followed by a train travelling via Hyde Central and Guide Bridge. In the late 1990s, the services to the two railway stations in Marple were streamlined; most Rose Hill services now run via Hyde and most Marple services take the faster and more direct route via Bredbury.

Most services since the late 1980s were operated with Class 142 Pacer diesel multiple units but, following their withdrawal from service in 2019/20, they are now run by Class 150s, Class 156s and Class 195s.

From 13 December 2010, Rose Hill Marple gained an extra second service per hour off-peak, due to the diversion of a service which previously turned back at Marple station.

In July 2020, Northern informed local residents that services between Manchester Piccadilly and Rose Hill Marple would not operate between 14 September and 14 December 2020, due to the impact of the COVID-19 pandemic on their operations. Services were restored afterwards.

== Facilities ==
Rose Hill Marple is a park and ride station, with its own 80-space car park. There is a ticket office, which is open on weekdays from 6:20 until 12:50; there is also a ticket machine at the station. The covered area provides a shelter with a three-seater bench. The original waiting room can be accessed during ticket office opening hours.

In addition to exposed railings around the station area, three secure bicycle lockers are provided at the north end of the platform, which require a 'BLUC' key for use.

Railway Road gives access to the Middlewood Way, a shared-use path for walkers, cyclists and horse-riders, which follows the line's previous route to Macclesfield. The initial section of this route was tarmacked and given street lighting in 2006; this was to encourage its use by residents of local residential developments in reaching the station and Stockport Road.

== Service ==
Northern Trains operates a typical service of three trains every two hours to Manchester Piccadilly, via the Hyde loop, reducing to hourly in the evening. There is no service on Sundays.

Preceding station	National Rail	Following station
Romiley	Northern Trains Hope Valley Line Mondays-Saturdays only	Terminus
	Disused railways	
Romiley	Great Central Railway & North Staffordshire Railway; Macclesfield, Bollington and Marple Railway	High Lane

== Future planning ==
As part of Manchester's Transport Innovation Fund (TIF) bid, which would have seen a weekday peak time congestion charge introduced on roads into the city centre, Rose Hill was among the stations listed to receive station improvements and improved services from the proposed £3bn injection into the region's public transport. This scheme was dropped after the plans were rejected substantially in a public referendum in December 2008.

Rose Hill Marple has been touted as a suitable terminus for a new Manchester Metrolink tram service to the area, with possible routes being either a simple conversion of the existing line to Manchester or a new link into Stockport town centre, via Bredbury and Portwood. The latter would provide an Eastern extension from the proposed Western link into Stockport town centre from Didsbury, linking together many towns in the borough along the Goyt and Mersey rivers. Despite heavy road traffic from private cars and buses, the local centres of Marple, Romiley and Bredbury have not been linked to their borough centre of Stockport by a direct passenger rail route since January 1967.

In March 2020, a bid was made to the Restoring Your Railway fund to get funds for a feasibility study into reinstating the line between Rose Hill Marple, Hazel Grove and Stockport (although incorrectly labelled as Maple Grove in DfT document). The bid was unsuccessful, but a further bid in 2021 has been accepted. A consultation on the link was launched in June 2022 for a new service from Rose Hill Marple to Stockport, which would involve a new chord in the Reddish Vale Country Park area.
