= Macclesfield, Bollington and Marple Railway =

Former railway line in North West England

Overview
- Status: Closed
- Owner: North Staffordshire Railway; Manchester, Sheffield and Lincolnshire Railway
- Locale: Cheshire
- Termini: Marple; Macclesfield
- Stations: 6

Service
- Type: Heavy rail

History
- Opened: 1869
- Closed: 1970

Technical
- Line length: 11 mi (17.7 km)
- Track gauge: 4 ft 8 1/2 in (1,435 mm) standard gauge

The Macclesfield, Bollington and Marple Railway (MB&MR) was a railway line between Macclesfield and Marple, England; it was 11 miles (18 kilometres) in length. The route was opened jointly by the Manchester, Sheffield and Lincolnshire Railway (MS&LR) and the North Staffordshire Railway (NSR) in 1869. It was part of an alternative link between Manchester and destinations south of Macclesfield. The line was closed in 1970 and its route now forms the Middlewood Way, a trail used by walkers, cyclists and horse riders.

== History ==
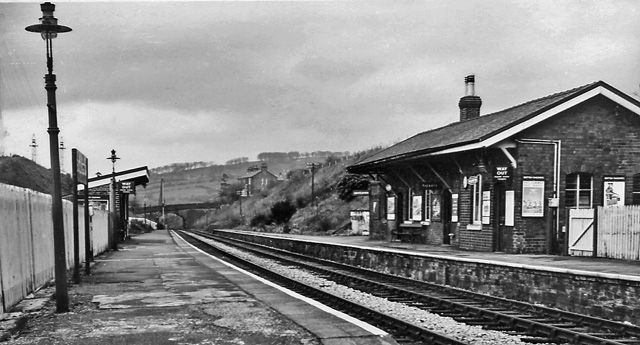
Bollington station, looking north, in 1965

In the 1840s and 1850s, the NSR was trying to find a route from Macclesfield to Manchester independent of the London and North Western Railway (L&NWR), which insisted on any NSR traffic going via Crewe, thus ensuring a higher L&NWR mileage and charges.

In 1863, a Macclesfield businessman, Thomas Oliver, promoted a scheme for a local line from Macclesfield to Marple, via Bollington, where it would connect with the MS&LR. It was hoped that the line would revive Bollington's cotton industry, carry the stone from quarries in Kerridge and serve the collieries around Poynton.

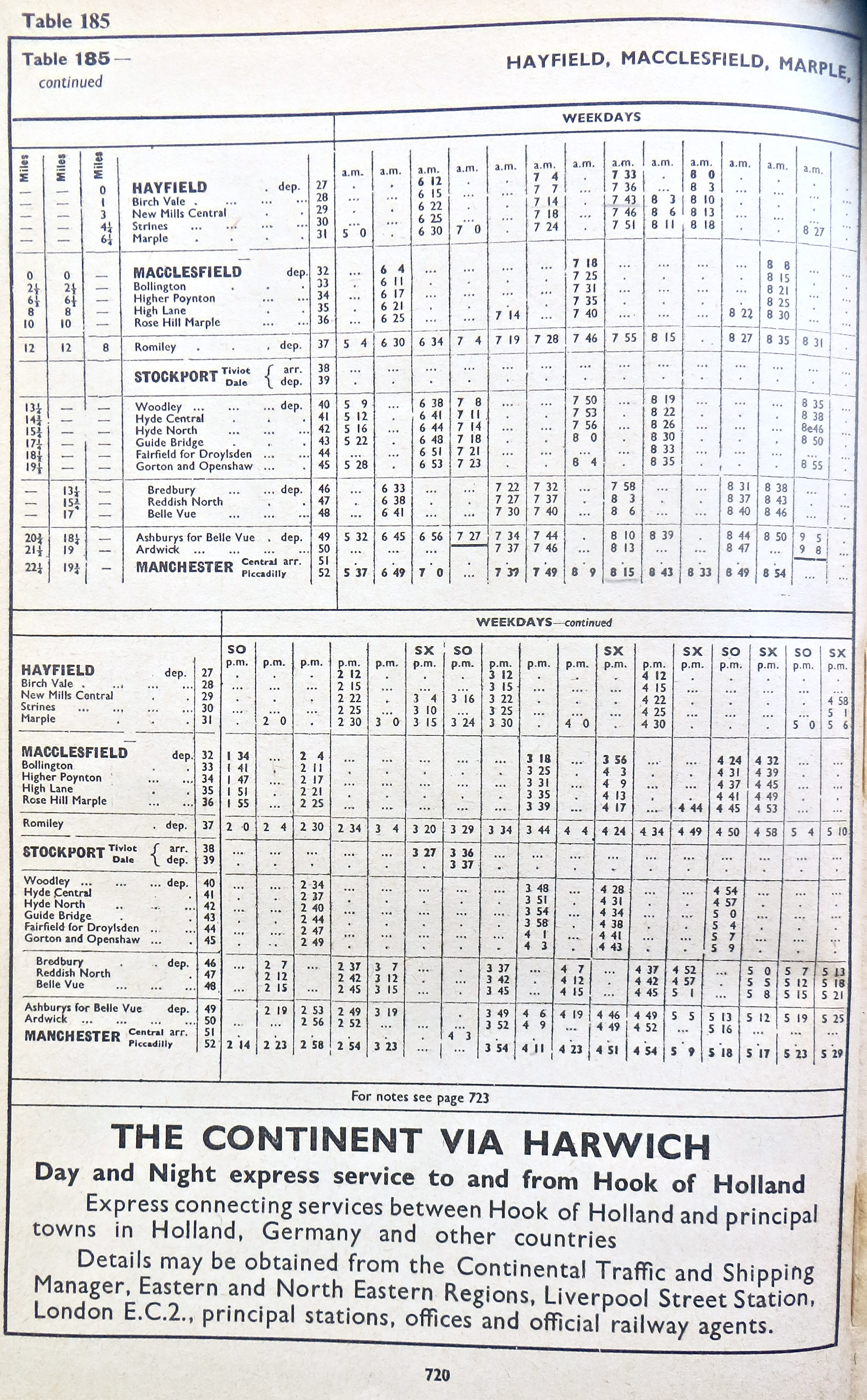
Summer 1961 timetable

Macclesfield, Bollington and Marple Railway Act 1864
- Act of Parliament
- Parliament of the United Kingdom
- Long title: An Act for incorporating a Company, and for making and maintaining the Macclesfield, Bollington, and Marple Railway; and for other Purposes.
- Citation: 27 & 28 Vict. c. cciv

Dates
- Royal assent: 14 July 1864

Text of statute as originally enacted

The MS&LR seized on this scheme because the company needed another line from which to start a possible independent extension line to London. In 1864, Parliament authorised the creation of the railway by passing the Macclesfield, Bollington and Marple Railway Act 1864 (27 & 28 Vict. c. cciv). Both the MS&LR and NSR were empowered to subscribe £80,000 each for its construction, and for its operation and maintenance once open.

In response to such competition, the L&NWR, which was surprised by the success of the MB&MR's proposal, quickly came to an amicable traffic agreement with the NSR. This deal negated the original purpose and urgency of the line because the NSR now no longer needed an independent route to Manchester, as it could use L&NWR lines.

Under these conditions, and with a general trade depression of the mid-1860s, construction of the new line was very slow. On 2 August 1869, a single-track line opened for passengers only; goods traffic started on 1 March 1870. In 1871, the whole line was double-tracked.

Macclesfield, Bollington, and Marple Committee Act 1871
- Act of Parliament
- Parliament of the United Kingdom
- Long title: An Act for dissolving the Macclesfield, Bollington, and Marple Railway Company, and for transferring their undertaking to the Manchester, Sheffield, and Lincolnshire and North Staffordshire Railway Companies jointly; and for other purposes.
- Citation: 34 & 35 Vict. c. xxxviii

Dates
- Royal assent: 25 May 1871

Text of statute as originally enacted

Initially, there were five stations on the line: Marple (Rose Hill), High Lane, Higher Poynton, Bollington and Macclesfield. In 1879, a new station was opened at Middlewood; it was later renamed Middlewood Higher.

In 1948, the line became part of the London Midland Region of British Railways. In 1960, Middlewood Higher station closed. By the 1960s, the line was considered to be a loss maker and was recommended for closure under the Beeching cuts.

On 5 January 1970, the section between Rose Hill (Marple) and Macclesfield closed to all traffic; the track was lifted in early 1971. Only Rose Hill remained in operation due to the high number of passengers commuting to Manchester Piccadilly. It is now a terminus for a spur off the Hope Valley Line.

The station buildings at Higher Poynton and Bollington were demolished at around the same time. High Lane station remained derelict for seven years after closure; the buildings were demolished in 1977. Bollington station goods yard is now the site of the Clough Bank industrial estate.

== Middlewood Way ==
Since closure, the trackbed has been turned into the Middlewood Way, a shared-use path between Macclesfield and Rose Hill in Marple. It was officially opened on 30 May 1985 by Dr David Bellamy. The platforms of High Lane and Higher Poynton stations are still extant; they have been restored and include picnic sites.

The trail crosses over a small valley of the River Dean at Bollington, via a curved 23-arch stone viaduct. The viaduct was originally slated to be demolished but, after protests, it was saved to form part of the trail.
