= Macclesfield railway station =

Railway station in Cheshire, England

Coordinates: 53.2595°N 2.1217°W

Macclesfield
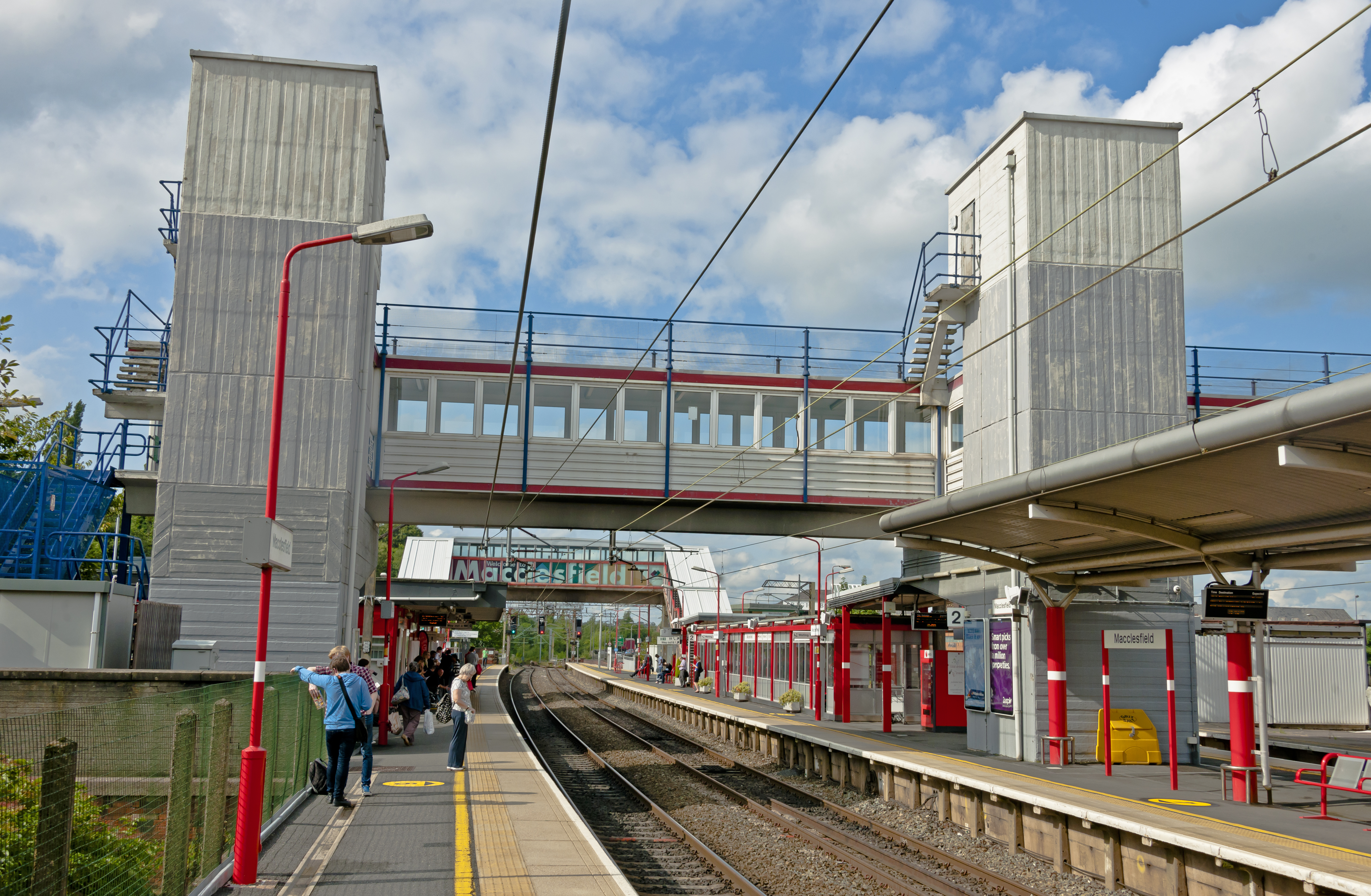
- Macclesfield station in August 2014

General information
- Location: Macclesfield, Cheshire East; England
- Grid reference: SJ919735
- Manager: Avanti West Coast
- Line: Stafford-Manchester
- Platforms: 3

Other information
- Station code: MAC
- Classification: DfT category C1

History
- Opened: July 1873
- Electrified: 1967

Key dates
- 26 August 2022: Signal Box closed

Passengers
- 2021/22: ▲0.996 million
- Interchange: ▲5,971
- 2022/23: ▲1.184 million
- Interchange: ▲7,693
- 2023/24: ▲1.354 million
- Interchange: ▲10,725
- 2024/25: ▲1.486 million
- Interchange: ▼8,728
- 2025/26: ▼1.451 million
- Interchange: ▲29,358
Location
Notes
- Passenger statistics from the Office of Rail and Road

Macclesfield railway station serves the Cheshire market town of Macclesfield, England. It lies on the Stafford to Manchester branch of the West Coast Main Line.

It is one of the three stations that provide access to the Middlewood Way, which follows the route of the former Macclesfield, Bollington and Marple Railway.

== History ==
The London and North Western Railway (LNWR) opened the line between Manchester and Macclesfield on 19 June 1849. On this date, the North Staffordshire Railway (NSR) completed the Congleton to Macclesfield section of its main Macclesfield - Stoke - Norton Bridge line. A new joint station, managed by a committee of both companies, was opened at Hibel Road a month later, replacing the temporary LNWR station at Beech Bridge.

During the 1860s, the North Staffordshire Railway collaborated with the Manchester, Sheffield and Lincolnshire Railway (MS&LR) to construct a joint railway between Macclesfield and Marple, near Manchester. For the NSR, this would provide a route to Manchester independently of the LNWR. For the MS&LR, it would provide a link to Stoke-on-Trent and the south. The joint railway was constituted as the Macclesfield, Bollington and Marple Railway (MB&M). It was opened throughout to a second, temporary Macclesfield station for passengers on 2 August 1869 and to goods on 1 March 1870. The MB&M then constructed its own permanent station in the town called Macclesfield Central. It was sited just south of the LNWR station, which was renamed Macclesfield Hibel Road for clarity. The new MB&M station was connected to the rest of the joint line for goods on 3 April 1871 and opened for passengers on 1 July 1873. It closed to all traffic south of Rose Hill in January 1970.

Some North Staffordshire Railway through trains from Macclesfield railway station used the Potteries Loop Line.

By the late 1920s, there was one freight train a day from Macclesfield Central to Normacot; this train used the Potteries Loop line.

On 7 November 1960, British Railways closed Macclesfield Hibel Road. Macclesfield Central was vastly remodelled and is now called simply Macclesfield station. As with many other stations on the West Coast Main Line, it was rebuilt in the Brutalist style of architecture; the beauty of the building was perceived to be its very functionality and its design follows the Modernist approach.

The station won the "Best Kept Station in Cheshire Award" for 2007 but, in summer 2011, it was reported to be "distinctly shabby", with peeling paintwork.

=== Accidents and incidents ===
- On 26 July 1971, an electric multiple unit departed from the station against signals and was derailed by trap points.

== Facilities ==
Facilities at the station include ticket sales, a kiosk, a waiting room and public toilets.

== Services ==
Trains arriving and departing station

Macclesfield is served by three train operating companies: Avanti West Coast, CrossCountry and Northern Trains.

Northbound to Stockport and Manchester Piccadilly, Avanti West Coast and Northern operate hourly services, with some peak time extras, and CrossCountry runs two services an hour.

Southbound, there are also four trains per hour: one stopping service to Stoke-on-Trent, operated by Northern Trains; one inter-city service to London Euston, operated by Avanti West Coast; one to Bournemouth, via Birmingham New Street and Reading; and one to Bristol Temple Meads, both operated by CrossCountry.

Sunday services are similar, with a reduced local stopping service operated by Northern Trains.

Grand Central is applying for permission to operate a limited number of services between Manchester Piccadilly and London ST Pancras, these services are planned to start in 2029 and are planned to call at Macclesfield.

Preceding station	National Rail	Following station
Stoke-on-Trent	Avanti West Coast London – Manchester via Stoke-on-Trent	Stockport
Stoke-on-Trent	CrossCountry Cross Country Route	Stockport
Congleton	Northern Trains Stoke-on-Trent – Manchester Piccadilly (Local stopping service)	Prestbury
Congleton	Northern Trains Stoke-on-Trent – Manchester Piccadilly (Local stopping service)	Poynton
Terminus	Northern Trains Macclesfield – Manchester Piccadilly (Local stopping service) (Limited service)	Poynton
	Proposed services	
Congleton	Grand Central Manchester Piccadilly to London ST Pancras (limited service)	Stockport
Preceding station	Historical railways	Following station
North Rode; Line open, station closed	North Staffordshire Railway; Churnet Valley Line	Terminus
Preceding station	Disused railways	Following station
Terminus	North Staffordshire Railway; Manchester, Sheffield and Lincolnshire Railway; Macclesfield, Bollington and Marple Railway	Bollington; Line and station closed
Terminus	London, Midland and Scottish Railway Potteries Loop Line (Once a day freight train only)	Normacot Line and station closed
