= Buxton Baths =

Listed buildings in Derbyshire, England

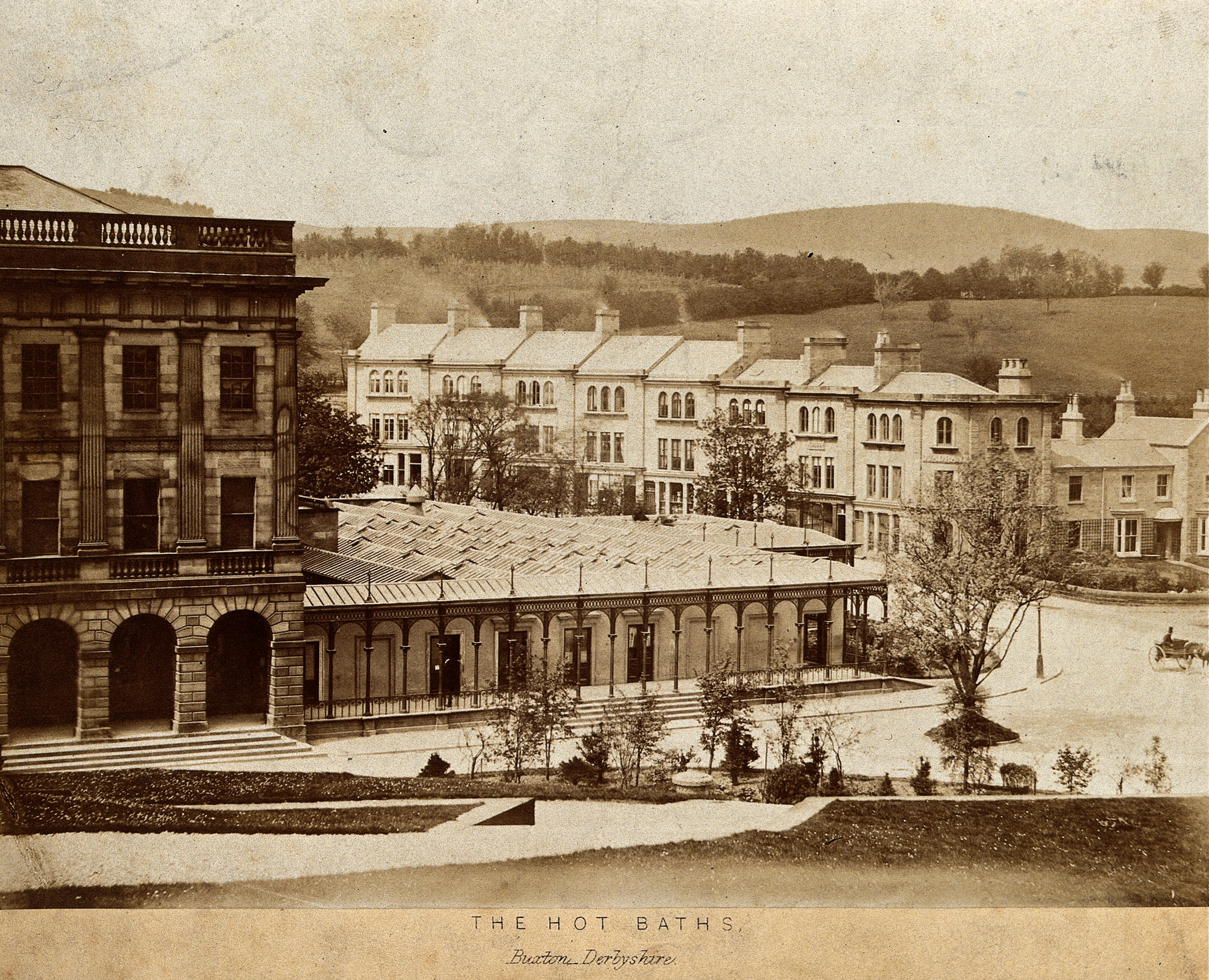
- Buxton Thermal Baths
- Interactive map of the Buxton Baths area

General information
- Location: Buxton, Derbyshire, England
- Coordinates: 53.2585°N 1.9158°W
- Construction started: 1851
- Completed: 1853

Design and construction
- Architect: Henry Currey
- Designations

Listed Building – Grade II
- Official name: Buxton Thermal Baths
- Designated: 25 January 1951
- Reference no.: 1257910

Listed Building – Grade II
- Official name: Natural Mineral Baths
- Designated: 25 January 1951
- Reference no.: 1257914

The Buxton Baths using natural thermal spring water are in Buxton, Derbyshire, England. The baths date back to Roman times and were the basis for developing Buxton as a Georgian and Victorian spa town. The present buildings of the Thermal Baths and the Natural Mineral Baths were opened in the 1850s. They are positioned on either side of the Buxton Crescent at the foot of The Slopes in the town's Central Conservation Area. They are both Grade II listed buildings designed by Henry Currey, architect for the 7th Duke of Devonshire.

== Geothermal spring ==
The geothermal spring that feeds the baths rises from about 1km below ground and produces about a million litres of water per day. The mineral water emerges at a steady 27°C / 80°F. Analysis of the water has indicated that it has a high magnesium content and that it originates from rainfall around 5,000 years ago (based upon its tritium content). The source of the natural spring lies beneath the Old Hall Hotel.

== Natural Mineral Baths ==
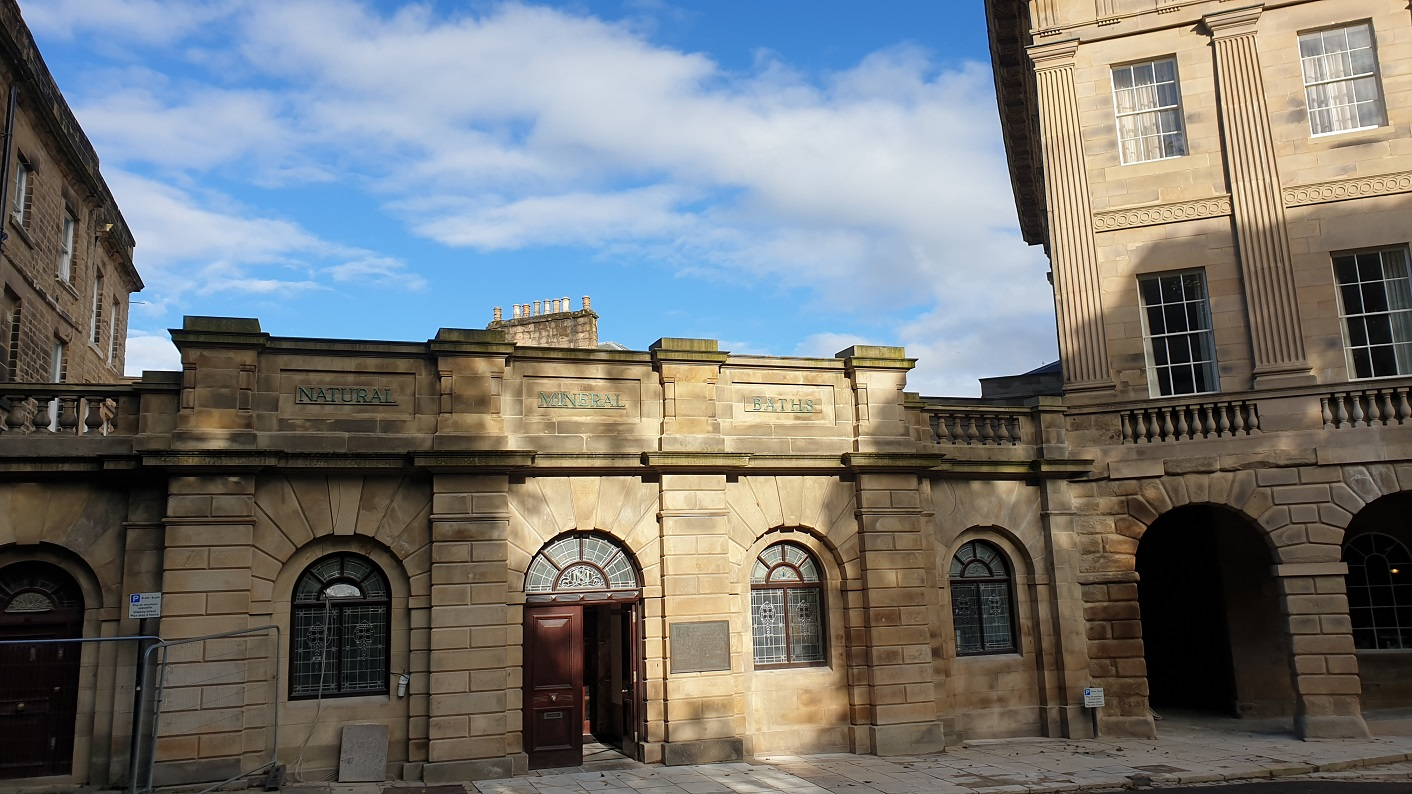
Natural Mineral Baths in 2020

The warm spring emerges in two main locations, which are where the 'Great Bath' (Gentlemen's Public Bath) was built in the 1600s behind the Old Hall Hotel. It was housed in the stately Arch Room, which was 10 yards long by over 5 yards wide. In 1696 Cornelius White built an outer bath for the poor. The bathhouse was rebuilt in 1712 by John Barker. The Georgian Crescent was built in the 1780s next to the baths. There were seven baths by 1793 for gentlemen and for ladies, both public and private, a charity bath for the poor, a cool bath and a 'Matlock' bath (where warm and cool waters were mixed to replicate the 19.8°C temperature of the fashionable spring at Matlock).

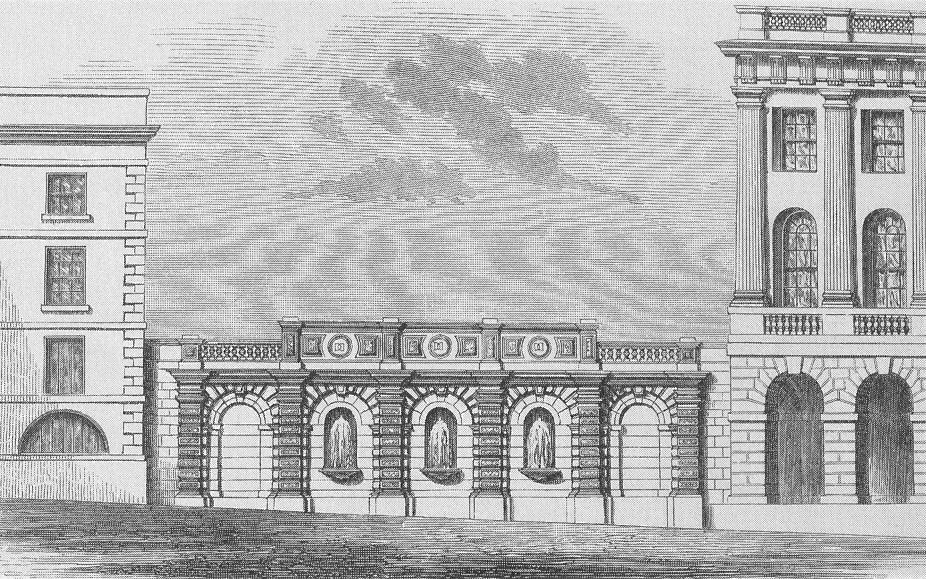
Natural Mineral Baths in the 1850s

The present Natural Mineral Baths building was designed by Henry Currey and built in ashlar gritstone from 1851 to 1852. The building included a public bath, a charity bath, two private ladies' baths and two private gentlemen's baths. The building originally had a fountain in each of the three arched niches of its facade. Currey also designed the new drinking fountain of St Ann's Well in 1852, opposite the Natural Baths.

In 1894 the Pump Room, also designed by Currey, was opened opposite the Crescent to extend the facilities where people could drink the spring water and socialise. It was built in response to overcrowding of the drinking well at the Natural Baths by both paying and charity patients.

Following World War I, the baths were also used to help injured soldiers with their recovery. The building was altered in the 1920s to move the covered side entrance to the open front of the building. In 1924 the Borough Council used a loan from the Ministry of Health to upgrade the Natural Baths with a multitude of the latest electro-water treatments and Italian mud treatment. In the 1960s the Natural Baths was converted into a public swimming pool, but it closed in 1972 when a new swimming pool complex was opened in the Pavilion Gardens.

The Natural Mineral Baths building has now been renovated into a modern spa for the newly restored Crescent Hotel. It incorporates the original warm springwater pool as well as an indoor and outdoor swimming pool, sauna, steam room and spa treatments.

== Thermal Baths ==
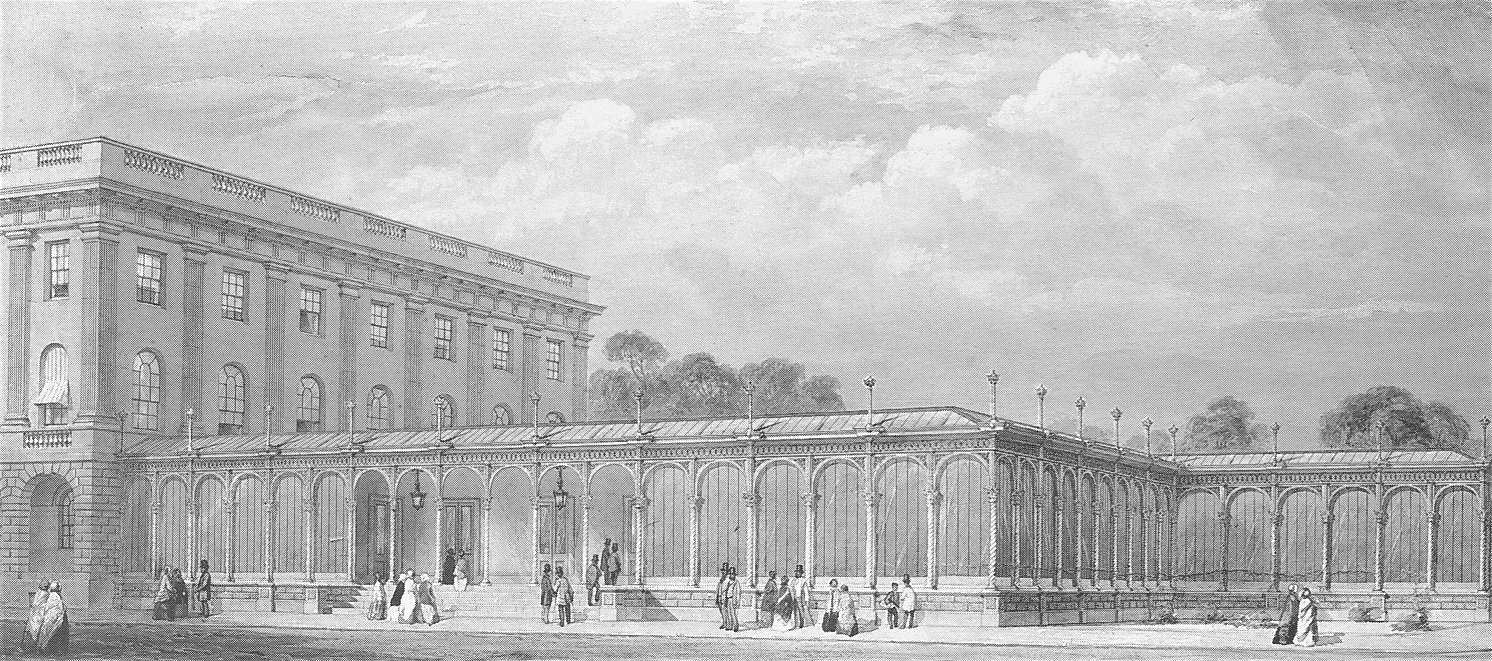
Thermal Baths in the 1850s

The Duke of Devonshire's agent Phillip Heacock lobbied for establishing coal-fired hot baths in the town in the early 1800s. The modest flat-roofed Hot Baths, designed by Charles Sylvester, were built in 1817 next to the east wing of The Crescent. In 1837 the Hot Baths were expanded, with two ladies' baths and two gentlemen's baths as well as the addition of a vapour and shower bath. These were all replaced in 1853 with the grand Thermal Baths iron and glass building designed by Henry Currey in the style of The Crystal Palace. Various hydrotherapy treatments were provided for the guests. There was a cold swimming pool at the side, which became a billiard room in the 1860s. A new water tower, waiting room and shops were added in the 1880s. The building was remodelled by William Radford Bryden in 1900 with the removal of the glass and iron colonnades and a new ashlar gritstone facade. There were separate entrances for ladies and gentlemen.

A memorial to Samuel Turner (an activist in town improvements and public welfare) stands outside the Hot Baths. Designed by Robert Rippon Duke, it was erected in 1879 and has a drinking fountain on each side. After World War II, the use of the baths declined, with no funding by the new National Health Service for medical water treatments. The Hot Baths closed in 1963.

=== The Cavendish Arcade ===
The building was converted between 1984 and 1987, by conservation architects Derek Latham and Company, into specialist shops and opened as the Cavendish Arcade. An arcade was formed by the introduction of a barrel-vaulted stained-glass roof, designed by artist Brian Clarke, creating a covered public space and linking together the Baths buildings. The restoration kept the Baths’ original, external structure and much of the interiors, including two of the small former baths, and retained, restored and, where necessary, replaced with facsimile equivalents, the Victorian Minton tilework.

== Water medicine ==
The claimed health-giving properties of the chalybeate (mineral-bearing) spring water was behind the popularity of the Buxton Baths. This reputation went back for centuries. In the 1460s antiquarian William Worcester wrote of the Buxton spring waters in his book Itinerarium: "Memorandum that Holywell ... makes many miracles, making the infirm healthy, and in winter it is warm, even as honeyed milk." Mary Queen of Scots visited St Ann's Well in Buxton most years from 1573 to 1584 to ‘take the cure’ for her rheumatism.

During the Victorian era the reputation of Buxton's curative waters was given scientific credibility by Sir Charles Scudamore. In 1820 he published his analysis of the water's chemistry and its effectiveness for treating gout. Hydrotherapy became an established treatment for a variety of medical conditions. Dr William Henry Robertson moved to Buxton in 1835 and he also studied the effects of the local mineral waters on disease. He promoted their benefits in the treatment of gout, rheumatism, sciatica, etc. His Guide To The Use Of The Buxton Waters ran to twenty-four editions. By the turn of the century, over 75,000 baths were being taken each year.

== Buxton Bath Charity ==
The Buxton Bath Charity was founded in 1779 to pay for poor people to have access to the Buxton waters. All visitors to Buxton's hotels and lodging houses were expected to contribute one shilling to the charity and sign the subscription book. In 1822 there were nearly 800 patients admitted through the charity, which paid for board and lodging, medicines and water treatments for up to five weeks. By the 1850s the numbers exceeded 1000 and half of the Great Stables was converted to a hospital for the charity. Henry Currey designed the conversion to the Devonshire Hospital which opened in 1859 with 120 beds for the poor. The charity became The Devonshire Hospital and Buxton Bath Charity. The stables on the ground floor were converted into hospital rooms between 1879 and 1882 and a great dome was added (the building is now called the Devonshire Dome). 300 hospital beds "for the relief of the poor" were now accommodated in Robert Rippon Duke's design. Sir Charles Scudamore and Dr Robertson were both honorary physicians for the charity and in 1865 Dr Robertson became chairman of The Devonshire Hospital and Buxton Bath Charity.

King Edward VII (a friend of the 8th Duke of Devonshire) and Queen Alexandra came to Buxton in 1905 to tour the Devonshire Hospital and Buxton Bath Charity. The royals also visited the Thermal and Natural Baths, the Pump Room and the Pavilion Gardens. The hospital became known as the Devonshire Royal Hospital in 1934.

== Roman baths ==
Aquae Arnemetiae (Roman Buxton) and Aquae Sulis (modern town of Bath in Somerset) were the only two Roman bath towns in Britain. The Romans built a bath at the location of the main thermal spring. In the late 17th century, Cornelius White operated bathing facilities at the hot spring at the site of the Buxton Old Hall. In 1695 he discovered an ancient smooth stone bath (20m long by 7m wide) as well as a lead cistern (2m square) on an oak timber frame. When the Crescent hotel was built on the site in 1780, a Roman bath was identified and described as ‘a leaden cistern'. The bath is now buried beneath the Crescent, next to the Natural Mineral Baths building that was constructed next to the hotel. Near to the site of the main spring, excavations in 2005 revealed the entry passage and doorways to the Roman baths. Between 2009 and 2012 further underground cisterns and a large iron cauldron were revealed.

The main spring was excavated in the 1970s and a hoard of 232 Roman coins was found, spanning 300 years of the Roman occupation of Britain. Coins would have been thrown into the sacred waters to seek the favour of the Gods. The coins and pieces of bronze jewellery found with them are on display in the Buxton Museum.

== See also ==
- List of hot springs
- Listed buildings in Buxton
