= Henry Currey (architect) =

British architect

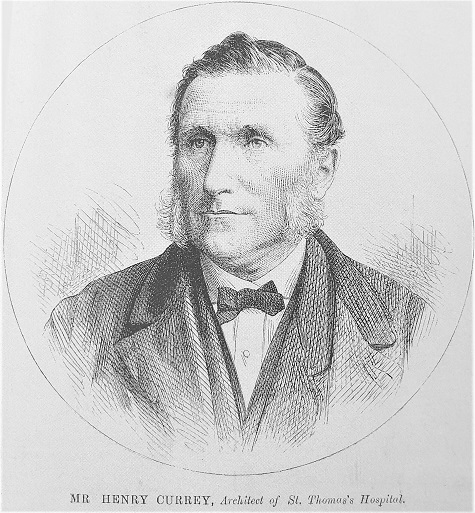
Henry Currey

Henry Currey (1820–1900) was an English architect and surveyor.

== Family life ==
He was born in October 1820, the third son of a solicitor, Benjamin Currey of Old Palace Yard, Westminster. He married Emily Harriet Rugge-Price in Spring Grove, London on 2 April 1845. Emily, born in 1818 and two years Henry's senior, was the daughter of Sir Charles Rugge-Price. There were four children from the marriage: Annette, Charles, Henrietta and Percival, who also became an architect.

== Education and work ==
Educated at Dr Pinckney's School at East Sheen and at Eton College, where he rowed in the school eight against Westminster, Currey was articled to the architect Decimus Burton for five years. He then worked for five years at the office of William Cubitt (1791–1863) and Company of Gray's Inn Road, London. His first medical works were for the Surrey Lunatic Asylum, and soon after, in 1847, he was appointed as the architect and surveyor to the governors of St Thomas' Hospital, a post he held until his death. In this post, he designed the new hospital, built in the 'pavilion style', which opened on the Albert Embankment by Westminster Bridge in 1871, including a teaching hospital and a nursing school to a design approved by Florence Nightingale. He was also the architect and surveyor to Coram's Foundling Hospital and to the Magdalen Hospital in London.

Other notable works include the hotel at London Bridge Station, 1861–62, a grand 250-room terminus hotel built at a cost of £111,000, later turned into offices for the LBSCR in 1892 and demolished after bomb damage in 1941

He was a Fellow of the RIBA from 1856 and served as its vice-president in 1874–77 and 1889–93. He was also a fellow of the Surveyors' Institute (now the RICS) and an associate of the Institution of Civil Engineers.

In 1859, he was appointed by the 7th Duke of Devonshire to replace his former architect, James Berry. Currey held the position for 40 years.

== Work at Buxton ==
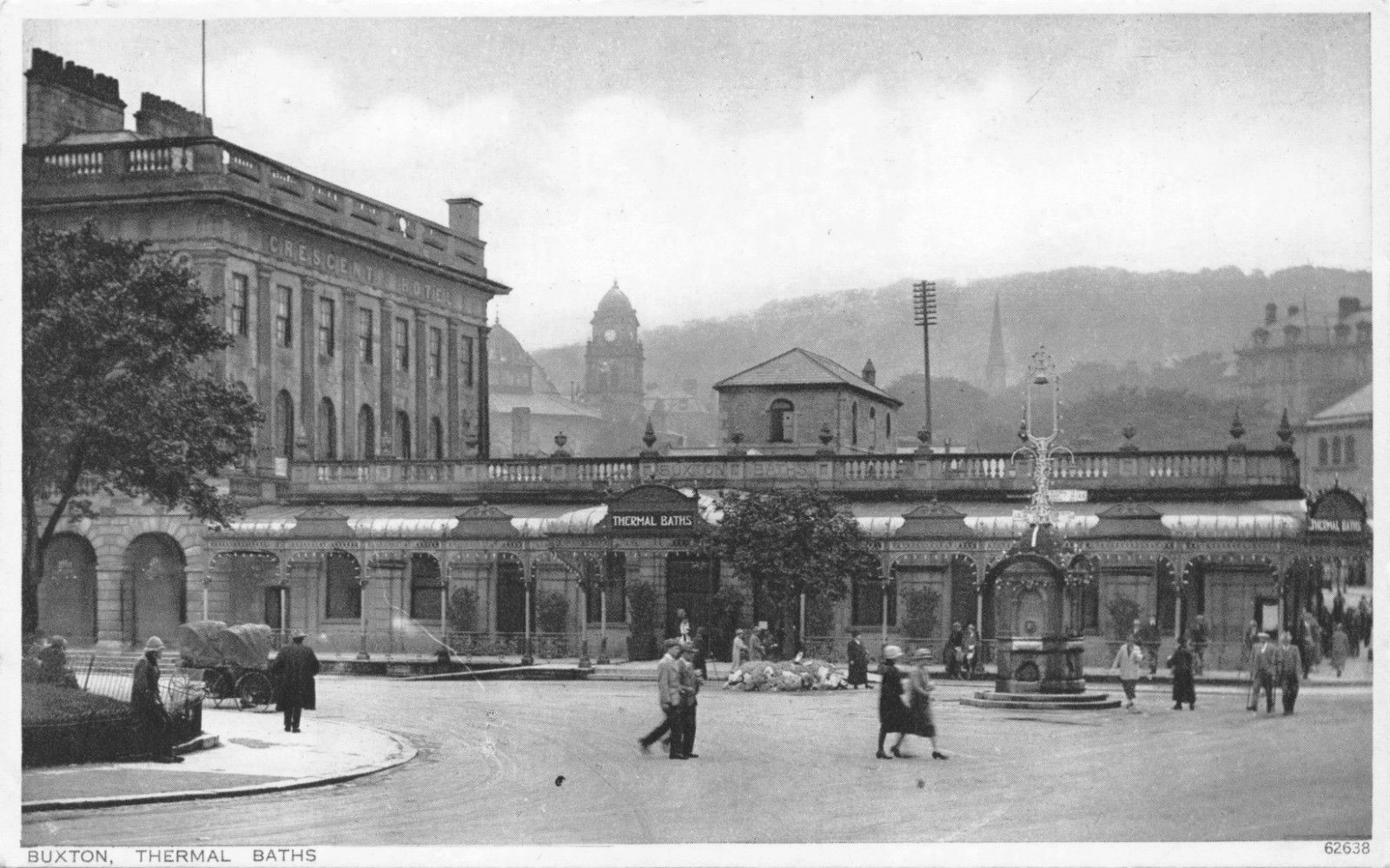
Henry Currey's Grade II listed Buxton Thermal Baths

As architect for the extensive Devonshire Estate in Buxton, Currey was highly influential in the town's development as a Victorian spa resort, much in his preferred Italianate design. Between 1852 and 1853 the Thermal Baths and Natural Baths (on either side of The Crescent) were completely rebuilt to his designs. He also designed Buxton's St Ann's Well of 1852. He was the architect of Corbar Hall and Devonshire Villas in the same year. Currey's Market Hall was built in 1857 but it was destroyed by fire in 1885 (the present Buxton Town Hall was built on the site in 1889). In 1859 he remodelled half of John Carr's Great Stables as the Devonshire Hospital (to which Robert Rippon Duke later added the dome), now known as the Devonshire Dome. In 1863 he designed the grand Palace Hotel in the style of a French château. The dining room extension to the Old Hall Hotel was designed by Currey. During the 1860s he designed various villas on Cavendish Terrace (now the Broad Walk). He was also the architect of several churches: Holy Trinity Church (built in 1873), Christ Church at Burbage (built in 1861), Congregational Church (built in 1863, demolished in 1983), Devonshire Park Chapel (built in 1873, demolished c.1970) and the vicarage for St John's Church. In 1894 he designed Buxton's new Pump Room (at the foot of The Slopes), which was opened by the 8th Duke of Devonshire in front of a vast crowd.

== Work at Eastbourne ==
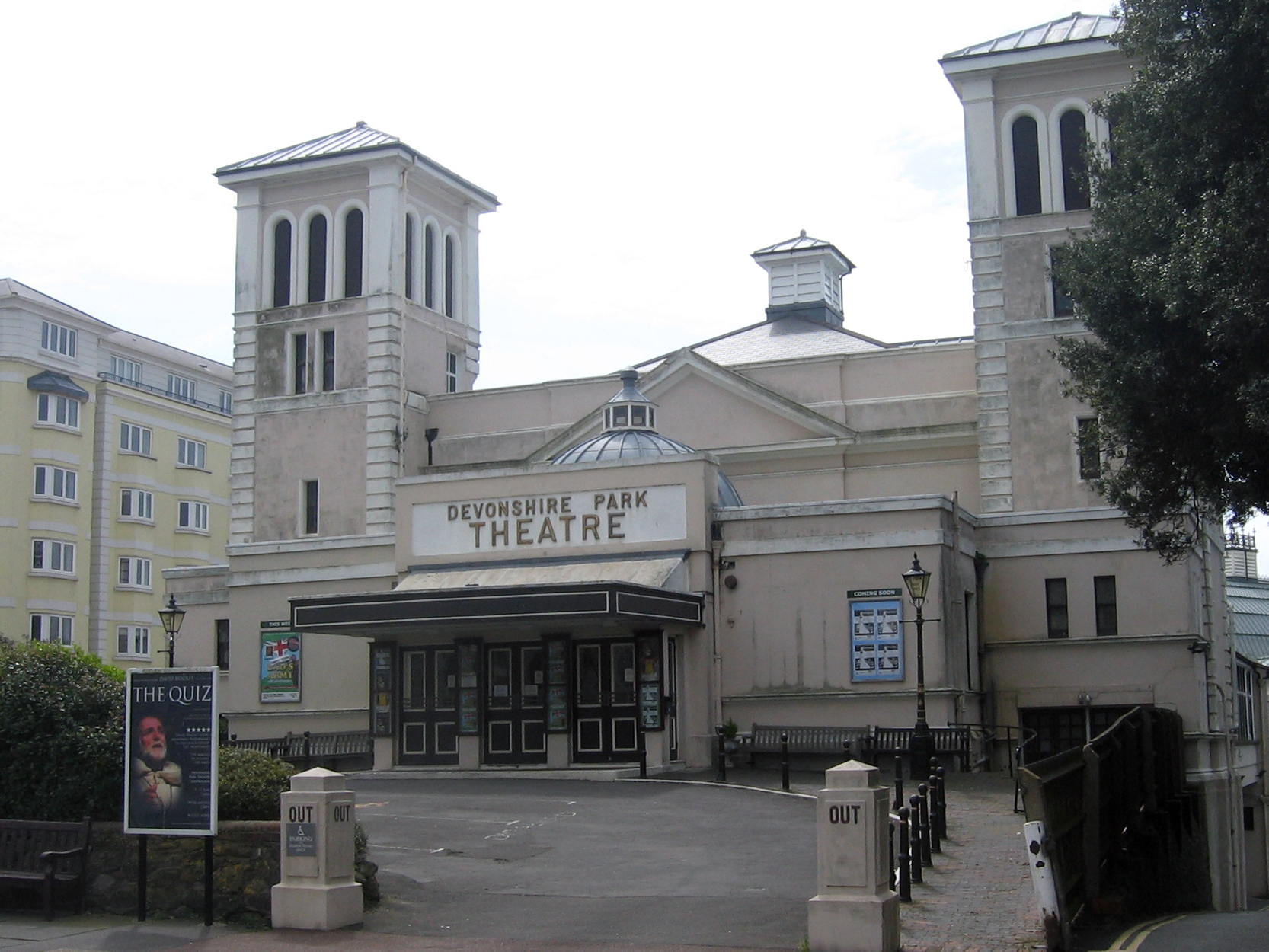
Henry Currey’s Grade II listed Devonshire Park Theatre in Eastbourne

The Duke of Devonshire owned many buildings and much land in Eastbourne. In 1870, he designed the original College House for Eastbourne College, a project which was followed three years later by drawings for the chapel, and in 1879, Currey was to design the school's Cavendish Library. The gables and dormer windows of many of the large houses in the same part of Eastbourne (now known locally as 'Lower Meads') also bear witness to his style of architecture. Between 1874 and 1875, he designed the Winter Garden and Pavilion in Devonshire Park, both of which are now Grade II listed buildings. Nearby is the Devonshire Park Theatre, in Italianate style, a building which was influenced by his travels to Italy in the early 1860s. The Queen's Hotel on Marine Parade was his largest single project in the town. The building took a mere 11 months to erect and opened for guests in June 1880. The hotel stands in a prominent position opposite the pier and enjoys easterly views to Hastings and to Beachy Head in the west. Between 1881 and 1883, he designed the Bedfordwell Pumping Station for the Eastbourne Waterworks Company; the yellow- and red-brick Classical-style building was listed at Grade II in March 2014. His Kentish ragstone and Bath Stone St Peter's Church, again in the 'Lower Meads' area of the town, was completed in 1895 in Early English Gothic Revival style and could accommodate 800 worshippers. It was, however, made redundant and demolished in 1971.

== Death and interment ==
He died at his home, The Chestnuts, Lawrie Park, Sydenham, on 23 November 1900 and was buried in West Norwood Cemetery.

== See also ==
- Listed buildings in Eastbourne
- List of demolished places of worship in East Sussex
