= The Square, Buxton =

Listed building in Derbyshire, England

The Square
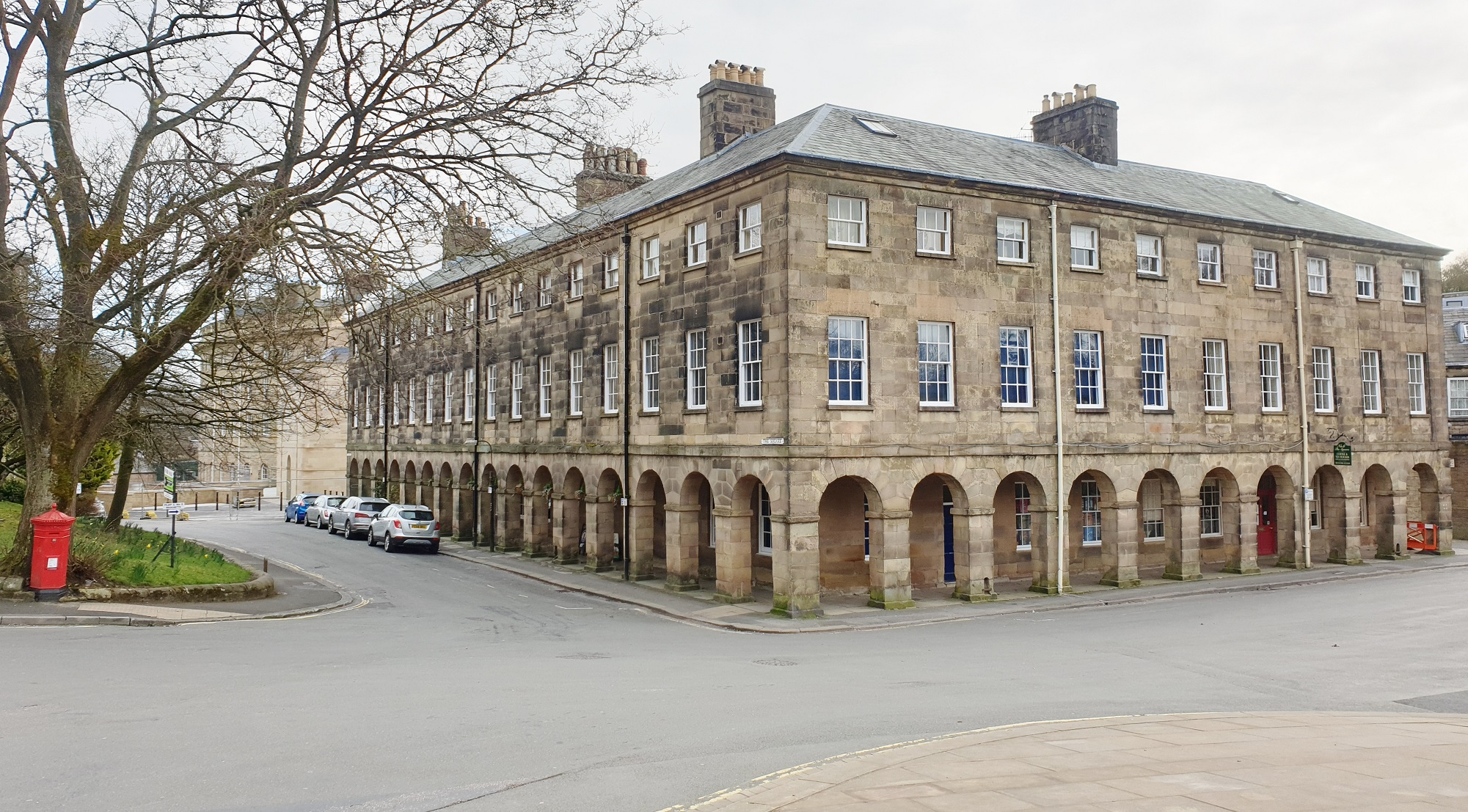

- Location within Derbyshire

General information
- Location: Buxton, Derbyshire, England
- Coordinates: 53.258°N 1.917°W
- Ordnance Survey: SK0571973512
- Construction started: 1803
- Completed: 1806
- Client: William Cavendish, 5th Duke of Devonshire

Design and construction
- Architect: John White
- Designations

Listed Building – Grade II*
- Designated: 25 January 1951
- Reference no.: 1257843

The Square is a Grade-II*-listed building in Buxton, Derbyshire, England. It lies in the town's central Conservation Area immediately between The Crescent, the Old Hall Hotel, the Pavilion Gardens and the Buxton Opera House.

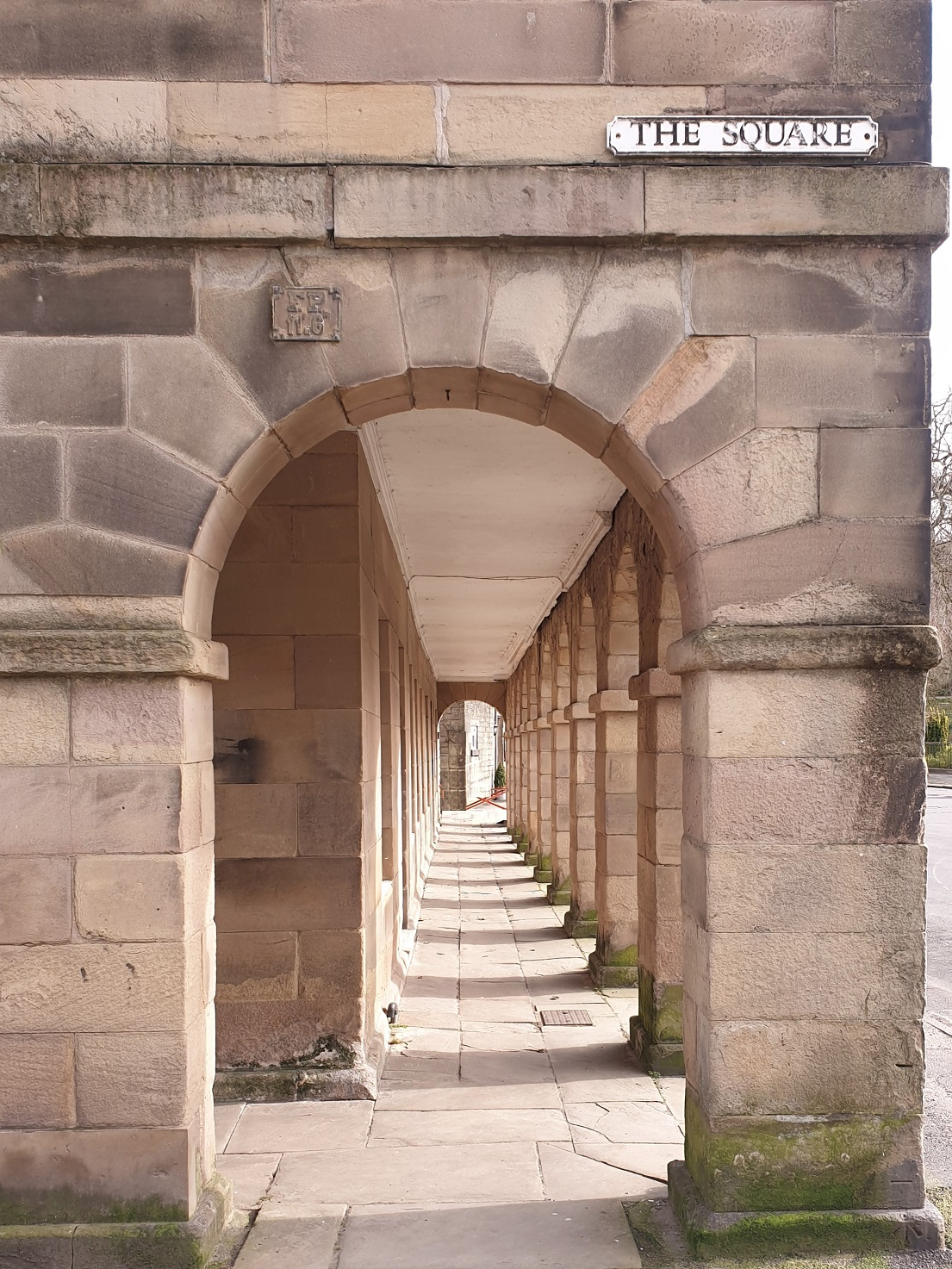
Colonnade of The Square at Buxton

The building was designed by architect John White (who also designed St John the Baptist Church, Buxton) and constructed from 1803–1806 for William Cavendish, 5th Duke of Devonshire. It was built as a series of six grand Georgian town houses from ashlar gritstone with a slate hipped roof. An arched, covered colonnade walkway at ground level features on both sides of the roadside facade.

The Square is built over the River Wye (which is channelled underneath through a culvert) due to the lack of space in the narrow river valley.

The renowned Buxton water physicians Sir Charles Scudamore and Dr William Henry Robertson lived and practised medicine at The Square. The Victorian architect Robert Rippon Duke was also an early resident.

There is a rare Grade-II-listed Victorian Penfold hexagonal post box from 1866 opposite The Square.

== See also ==
- Grade II* listed buildings in High Peak
- Listed buildings in Buxton
