= St Ann's Well (Buxton) =

Natural thermal spring at Buxton, Derbyshire

St Ann's Drinking Well
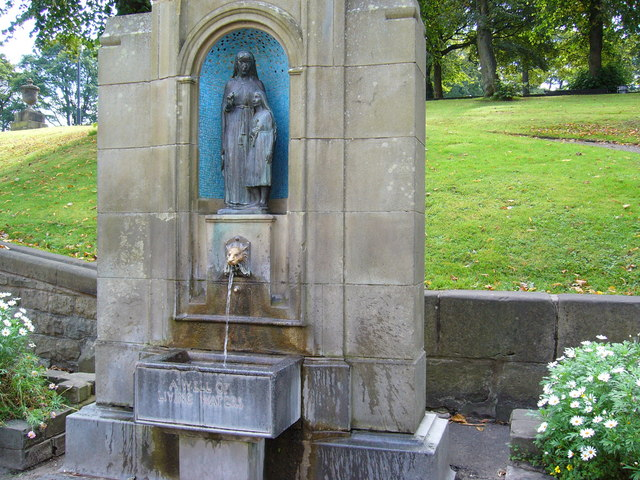
- Interactive map of the St Ann's Drinking Well area

General information
- Location: Buxton, Derbyshire, England
- Coordinates: 53.2588°N 1.9143°W
- Completed: 1940

St Ann's Well is an ancient natural warm spring in Buxton, Derbyshire in England. The drinking well is located at the foot of The Slopes (formerly St Ann's Cliff) and opposite the Crescent hotel and the Old Hall Hotel.

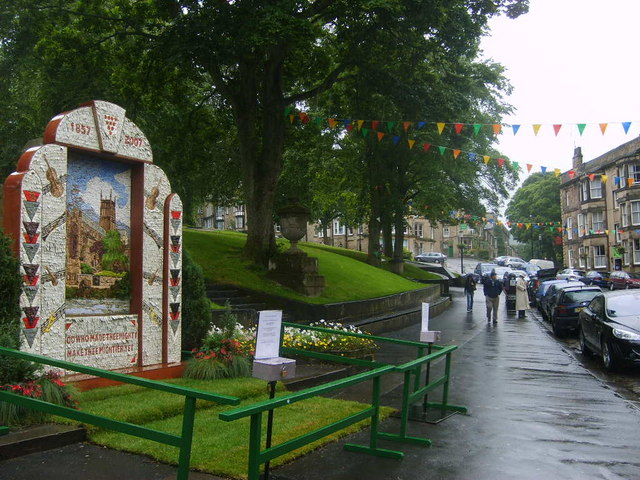
St Ann's Well Dressing in 2007

The natural warm waters of Buxton have been revered since Roman times. By the 1520s the spring was dedicated to St Anne (mother of the Virgin Mary) and the curative powers of the waters from the well were reported. A 16th-century act of Parliament ruled that a free supply of the spring water must be provided for the town's residents. The geothermal spring rises from about half a mile (1 km) below ground and about a quarter of a million gallons (a million litres) of water flow out per day. The mineral water emerges at a steady 27 °C (80 °F). Analysis of the water has indicated that it has a high magnesium content and that it originated from rainwater from around 5,000 years ago. The same spring water is bottled and sold as Buxton Mineral Water.

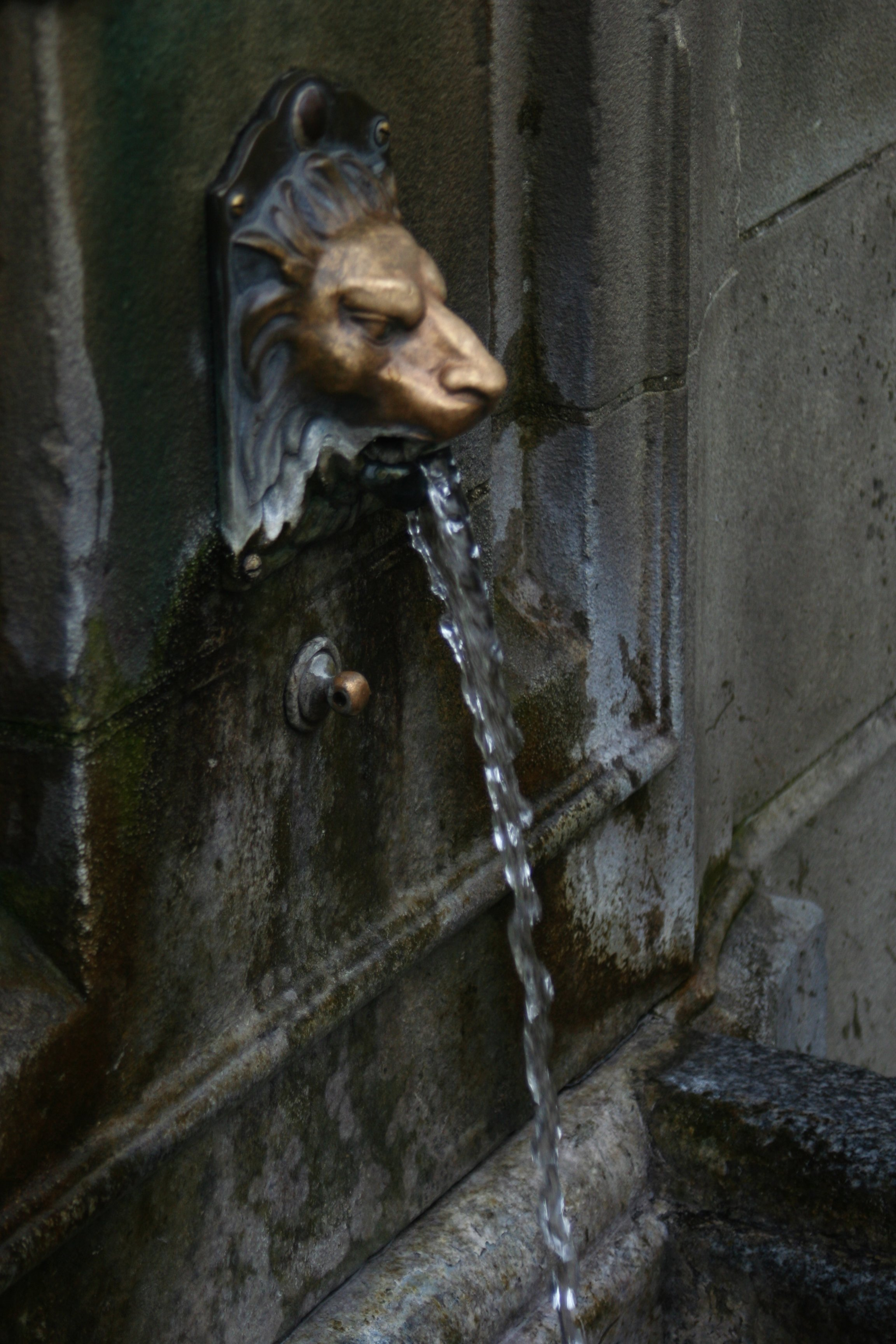
Bronze lion spout of St Ann's Well

== Roman baths ==
The Roman settlement of Aquae Arnemetiae was based around Buxton's natural warm spring. Aquae Arnemetiae means 'Waters of Arnemetia'. Arnemetia was the Romano-British goddess of the sacred grove (the name Arnemetia was derived from the Celtic for beside the sacred grove). The Romans built a bath at the location of the main thermal spring. In the late 17th-century Cornelius White operated bathing facilities at the hot spring at the site of the Buxton Old Hall. In 1695 he discovered an ancient smooth stone bath (20 metres; 65' long by 7 metres; 23' wide) as well as a lead cistern (2 metres, 6' square) on an oak timber frame. When the Crescent hotel was built on the site in 1780, a Roman bath was identified and described as 'a leaden cistern'. The bath is now buried beneath the Crescent, next to the Natural Mineral Baths building that was constructed next to the hotel. Near to the site of the main spring, excavations in 2005 revealed the entry passage and doorways to the Roman baths. Between 2009 and 2012 further underground cisterns and a large iron cauldron were revealed. The main spring was excavated in the 1970s and a hoard of 232 Roman coins was found, spanning 300 years of the Roman occupation of Britain. Coins would have been thrown into the sacred waters to seek the favour of the Gods. The coins and pieces of bronze jewellery found with them are on display in the Buxton Museum.

== Healing waters ==
In the 1460s antiquarian William Worcester wrote of the Buxton spring waters in his book Itinerarium:

"Memorandum that Holywell ... makes many miracles, making the infirm healthy, and in winter it is warm, even as honeyed milk."

In 1521, Sir Henry Willoughby made the first known reference associating St Anne with the healing powers of the well's waters. During Henry VIII's dissolution of the monasteries, Thomas Cromwell closed St Ann's Well in 1538, ordering it to be "locked up and sealed". In 1572, Dr John Jones from Derby wrote the first medical book (dedicated to the Earl of Shrewsbury) about Buxton's waters entitled The Benefit of the Auncient Bathes of Buckstones, which cureth most grievous Sickness. Mary Queen of Scots visited the well most years from 1573 to 1584, under guard and for up to a month at a time. By command of Queen Elizabeth I, she was held prisoner at Chatsworth House several times between 1569 and 1584. Mary was granted permission by the Queen to ‘take the cure’ for her rheumatism at St Ann's Well in Buxton. Before leaving in 1584, she etched in Latin on the window of her room at the Buxton Old Hall:

"Buxton, whose fame thy milk-waters tell, Whom I, perhaps, no more shall see, farewell."

The Seven Wonders of the Peak were described in the 17th century by the philosopher Thomas Hobbes. After touring the High Peak in 1626, Hobbes published his 84-page Latin poem De Mirabilibus Pecci in 1636. It was published with an English translation in 1676. He recounted:

"Of the High Peak are seven wonders writ. Two fonts, two caves. One pallace, mount and pit."

He wrote about St Ann's Well (one of the 'two fonts'):

"The Sun burnt clouds but glimmer to the fight,
when at famed Buxton’s hot bath we alight
unto St. Ann the Fountain sacred is:
With waters hot and cold its sources rise,
And in its Sulphur-veins there’s medicine lies.
This cures the palsied members of the old,
and cherishes the nerves grown stiff and cold"

— Thomas Hobbes, De Mirabilibus Pecci: Being The Wonders of the Peak in Darby-shire (1636)

In 1700 the well consisted of a stone basin with an ancient brick wall around it, a yard square inside and a yard high. Sir Thomas Delves built an arch over the spring of St Ann's Well in 1709, in thanks for his successful recuperation and in order to protect the quality of the water. The new structure provided seating on all sides for visitors. When the earlier wall around the well was demolished to make way for the arch, several Roman leaden cisterns and various utensils were discovered around the foundations.

== Georgian and Victorian spa ==
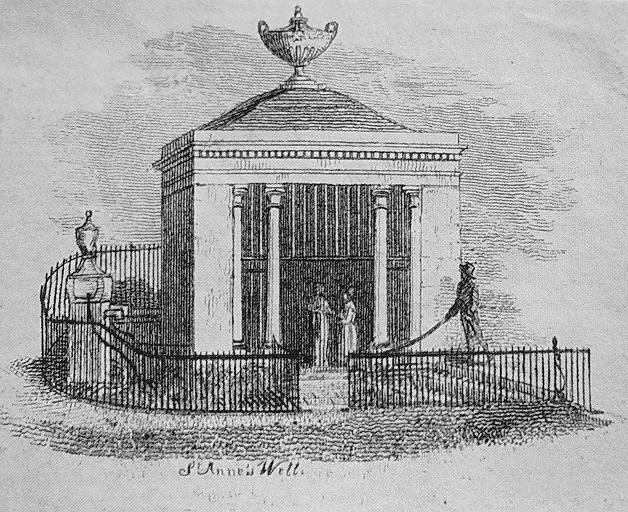
St Anne's Drinking Well in 1784

St Ann's Well was declared to be public property by the Buxton Inclosure Act 1772 (12 Geo. 3. c. 27 Pr.), with an obligation for it to be maintained in good condition. Each Easter week the parish Vestry appointed a poor woman as the 'Well Woman' to take care of the well and to help those taking the water. Martha Norton performed this role for 15 years between 1775 and 1820. The position was unpaid and depended on tips, until paid attendants were appointed from 1875. Architect John Carr designed the 1783 drinking well to comply with the Enclosure Act. The Georgian spa town blossomed with the building of the Crescent in the 1780s opposite St Ann's Well. It was commissioned by the 5th Duke of Devonshire and it was also designed by John Carr. Buxton's development as a Victorian spa town centered on the reputed healing powers of its natural mineral baths. The Buxton Bath Charity and numerous independent establishments offered hydropathic treatments using the thermal spring waters. Dr William Henry Robertson wrote the definitive guide to the Buxton waters, with its analysis of their medicinal properties.

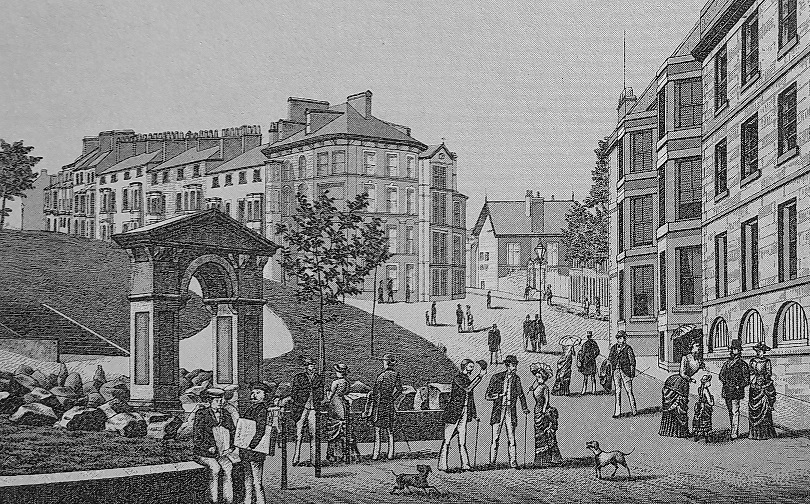
St Ann's Drinking Well of 1852

The new St Ann's drinking well of 1852 was designed by architect Henry Currey and it dispensed warm chalybeate (mineral-bearing) spring water alongside a cold water pump. The Pump Room was built next to St Ann's Well in 1894 to dispense the well's water from taps for drinking. The building (designed by Henry Currey) was a gift to the town by the 8th Duke of Devonshire, to safeguard the free public access to the water. In 1895, a new public drinking pump was erected next to the Pump Room. The current water fountain was built in 1940 and is a Grade II listed structure. It is made of ashlar gritstone with a brass lion's head spout pouring water into a marble trough. The inscription over the well is a tribute to Emelie Dorothy Bounds, Councillor of this Borough, by her husband and daughter. The bronze statue of St Ann and child is by the English sculptor Herbert William Palliser (1883–1963). The Pump Room is a Grade II listed building and is now the Buxton Tourist Information centre.

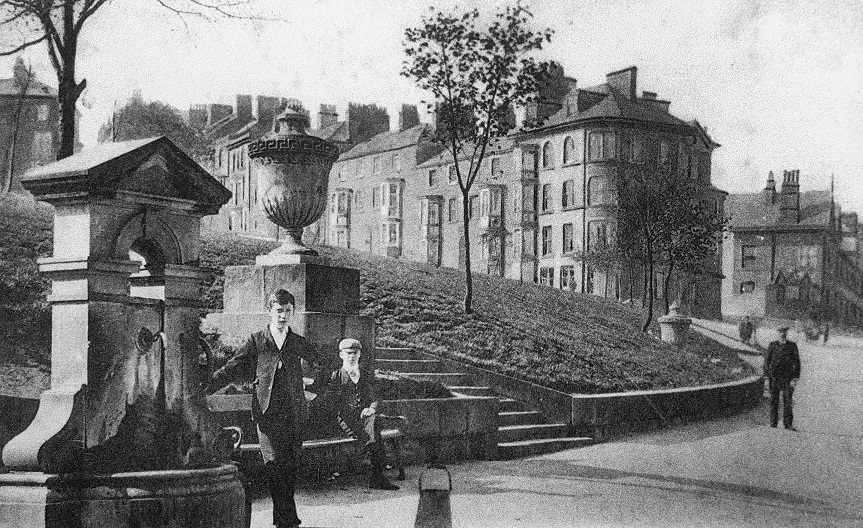
St Ann's Drinking Well of 1895

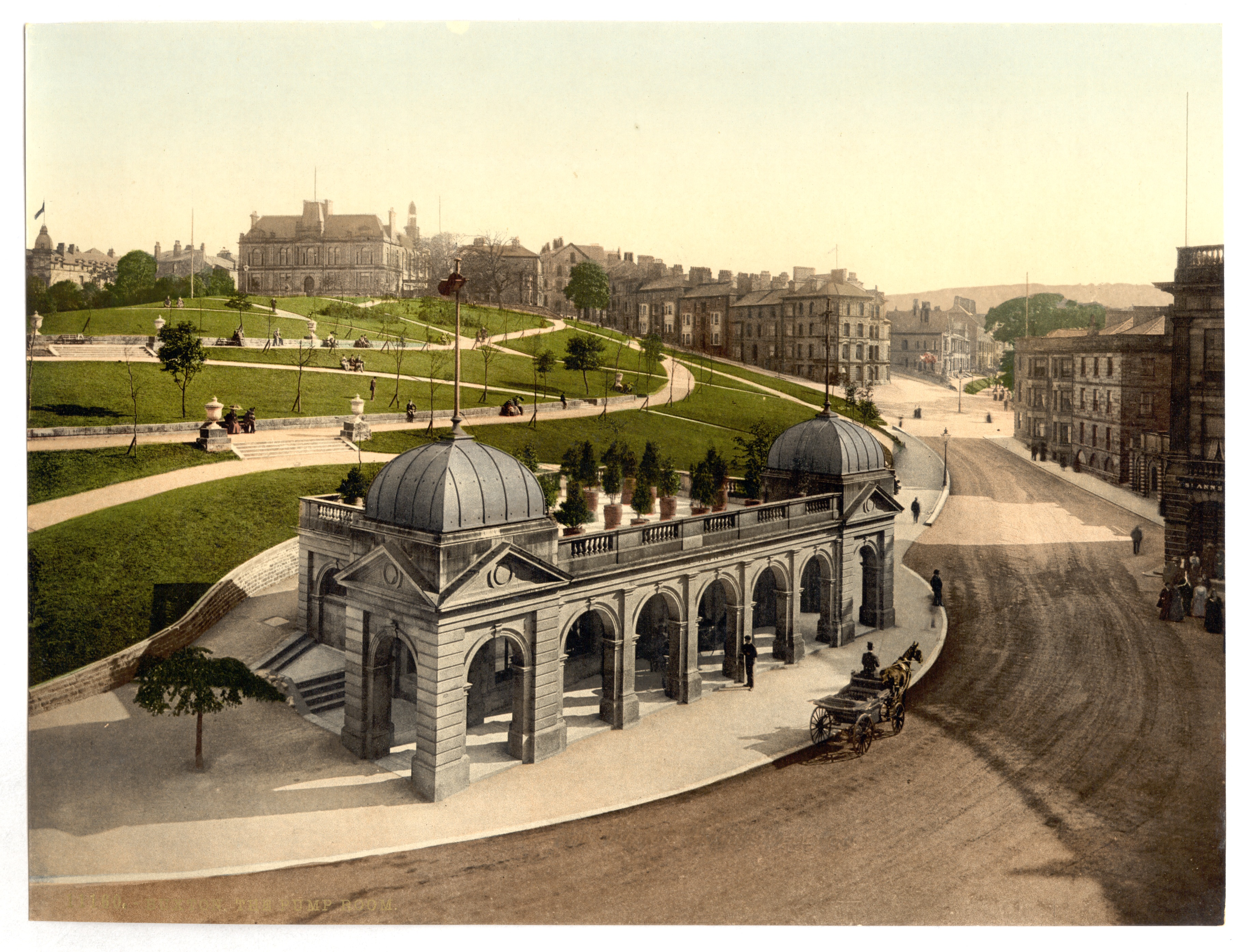
Buxton Pump Room at the foot of The Slopes

The annual celebration of well dressing (a centuries-old tradition in Derbyshire) was re-established in Victorian Buxton. In 1949, Princess Elizabeth and Prince Philip attended the St Ann's Well dressing during their visit to Buxton.

== Buxton Mineral Water ==
Drinking water from St Ann's Well has been bottled for sale since the 19th-century. The London Morning Advertiser on Tuesday 17 April 1855 carried a front page advert for:

"Buxton Mineral Waters – Bottled by authority at St. Ann’s Springs. – Sold in Pint Bottles, with direction for Use, by Francis E. Nielson, Pharmaceutical Chemist, the Quadrant, Buxton"

A trademark for bottled Buxton Water (sourced from the well) was registered by the Buxton Mineral Water Company in 1876. The trademark was embossed in a diamond shape on the glass Hamilton bottles. To retain the effervescence of the water, a Codd bottle used a rubber seal and a sliding marble within its neck. From the 1920s, soda syphons (seltzer bottles) became popular for buyers of Buxton Water. During the later 20th-century there was a move to screw caps glass bottles and more recently plastic bottles.

Nestlé acquired the Buxton Mineral Water Company in 1992. In 2012, it opened its new bottling plant at Waterswallows, with water piped from the original source at St Ann's spring two miles away.

== See also ==
- Listed buildings in Buxton
