= William Henry Robertson =

William Henry Robertson may refer to:

- William H. Robertson (1823–1898), American lawyer and politician from New York
- William Henry Robertson (physician) (1810–1897), English physician
