= Palace Hotel, Buxton =

Listed building in Derbyshire, England

Palace Hotel
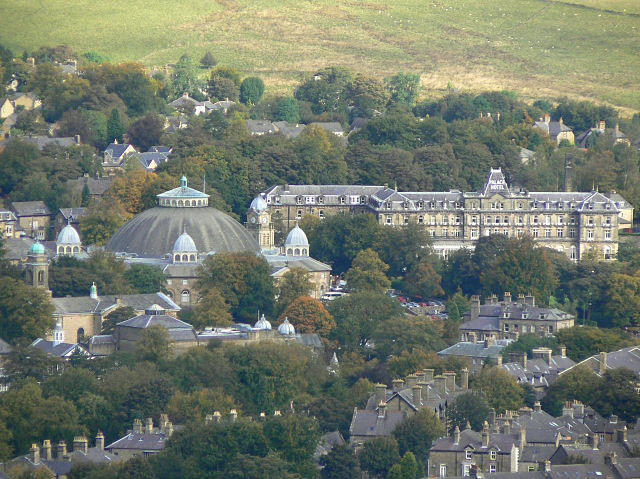
- Devonshire Dome and Palace Hotel
- Interactive map of the Palace Hotel area

General information
- Location: Buxton, Derbyshire, England
- Coordinates: 53.2608°N 1.9148°W
- Construction started: 1864; 162 years ago
- Completed: 1866; 160 years ago

Design and construction
- Architect: Henry Currey
- Designations

Listed Building – Grade II
- Designated: 18 October 1994
- Reference no.: 1258009

Website
- Official website

The Palace Hotel was opened in 1868 in Buxton, Derbyshire, England. It holds a prominent position in the town's central Conservation Area overlooking the town. It is a Grade-II listed building.

It was built from 1864 to 1866 as the first-class Buxton Hotel on the hill next to Buxton's two new railway stations. It cost £50,000 to build and had 105 rooms, a grand ballroom and 5 acres of landscaped gardens with croquet lawns and a tennis court. After its construction, the venture was liquidated and the hotel was auctioned in November 1867 at the Waterloo Hotel in Manchester. It was bought for £20,000 by a consortium including several of the original investors, the Duke of Devonshire and with the LNWR railway company as a major shareholder. It opened as the Palace Hotel in May 1868. It was the largest hotel in Buxton until the luxury Empire Hotel with 300 rooms was opened in 1903 (although the Empire never reopened after World War I and was demolished in 1964).

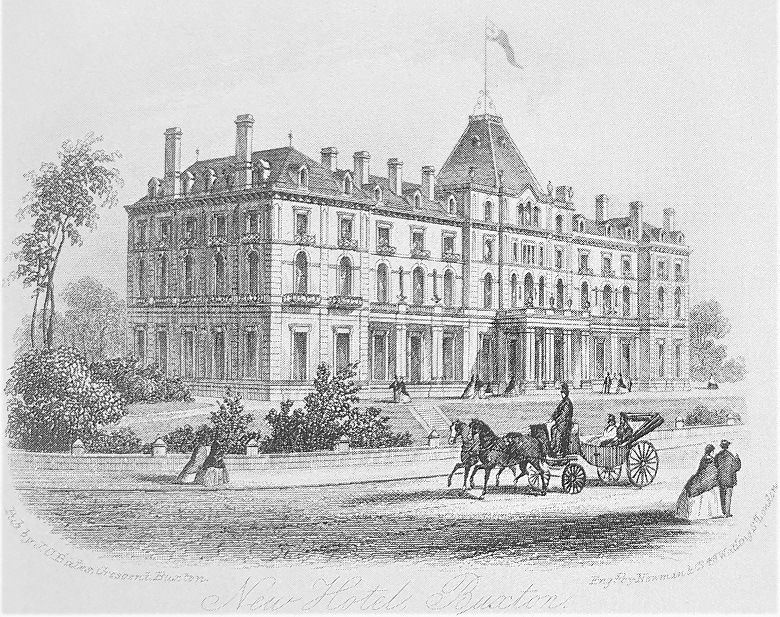
Originally the Buxton Hotel in 1867

The three-storey Palace Hotel is built of millstone grit stone and was designed in the style of a French château (with a Mansard roof with iron ridge railings and a central tower) by Henry Currey. Currey was the Duke of Devonshire's architect and he also designed Buxton's St Ann's Well of 1852, Thermal Baths, Natural Baths, Pump Room, Market Hall, Holy Trinity Church, Congregational Church, Devonshire Park Chapel, Christchurch at Burbage, Wye House Asylum and Corbar Hall. Fellow architect Robert Rippon Duke was the Clerk of Works for the hotel's construction and he designed the grand marble-decorated extensions to the building in 1887, including a large new dining room at the rear and a new west wing.

The hotel was an annexe to the Granville Military Hospital during World War I and used to billet British soldiers and later as a discharge centre for Canadian soldiers. After World War II (when the hotel was used as offices for the British civil service) the Palace Hotel was reopened by the Hewlett family, who also ran the Spa Plaza Hotel (formerly the Buxton Hydropathic). The red neon PALACE HOTEL sign on the tower is a distinctive sight in the town.

Football teams including Manchester United, Manchester City, Nottingham Forest and Southampton stayed at the Palace Hotel in the 1950s as a health resort. George Bernard Shaw, Douglas Fairbanks, Mary Pickford and Margaret Thatcher are some of the famous guests who stayed at the hotel. The hotel is now part of the Britannia Hotels group and it has a spa, gym, indoor pool and conference rooms.

== See also ==
- Listed buildings in Buxton
