= Buxton & Leek College =

Further Education College in England

Coordinates: 53.1076°N 2.0225°W

- Former names: Buxton College, Leek College, High Peak College, Leek School of Art, Nicholson Institute of Science and Technology
- Type: College of Further and Higher Education
- Active: May 2013 (current form). 1868 as Leek School of Art–31st July 2025.
- Academic affiliations: University of Derby
- Director: Dr Sarah Charles.
- Chair of the University Governing Council: Gurpreet Dehal
- Location: Buxton, Leek and Derby, England, UK
- Campus: Urban and Rural
- Website: http://www.blc.ac.uk/

Before demerging in July 2025, Buxton & Leek College was a college of Further and Higher Education operating at the campuses and facilities in Buxton, Derbyshire, Leek, Staffordshire and Derby, Derbyshire. The college was part of the University of Derby.

== History ==
Buxton & Leek College was formed in 2013 by the University of Derby bringing together all of their Further Education operations into one branded entity. Prior to this, the university ran Further Education under the name 'Buxton College’, with operations at the Buxton Campus and University of Derby's Kedleston Road site. After Leek College was merged into the university in 2012 both the 'Buxton College’ and 'Leek College’ names were dropped and replaced with the new name 'Buxton & Leek College’.

Buxton College was originally named High Peak College, which was an independent FE College up until 1998, when it was dissolved as an independent entity and merged into the University of Derby. High Peak College originally opened in 1955 in buildings in Buxton town centre, before moving out of the town centre to Harpur Hill in 1964 into what had been RAF buildings. In the mid-2000s the college was relocated to the refurbished Devonshire Dome in Buxton town centre, and was officially opened by Prince Charles in 2006. At this point it was renamed 'Buxton College’.

Leek College can trace its history back to 1868 when the Leek School of Art was founded in the town. Leek College of Further Education was formed in 1981 from the merger of the Leek School of Arts and Crafts and the Nicholson Institute of Science and Technology. The college was dissolved as an independent entity in 2012 when it was merged into the University of Derby.

Even before the mergers with High Peak College and Leek College, the University of Derby had a long history of providing further and adult education, having been founded as a teacher training College in 1851 and merging with various different colleges throughout the twentieth century, before achieving University status in 1992.

On the 31st July 2025 the College disbanded, the Leek Campus was sold to NSCG, the Campus was renamed NSCG Leek Campus. The Buxton Campus being retained by the University of Derby and renamed the University of Derby - Buxton.

== Campuses ==
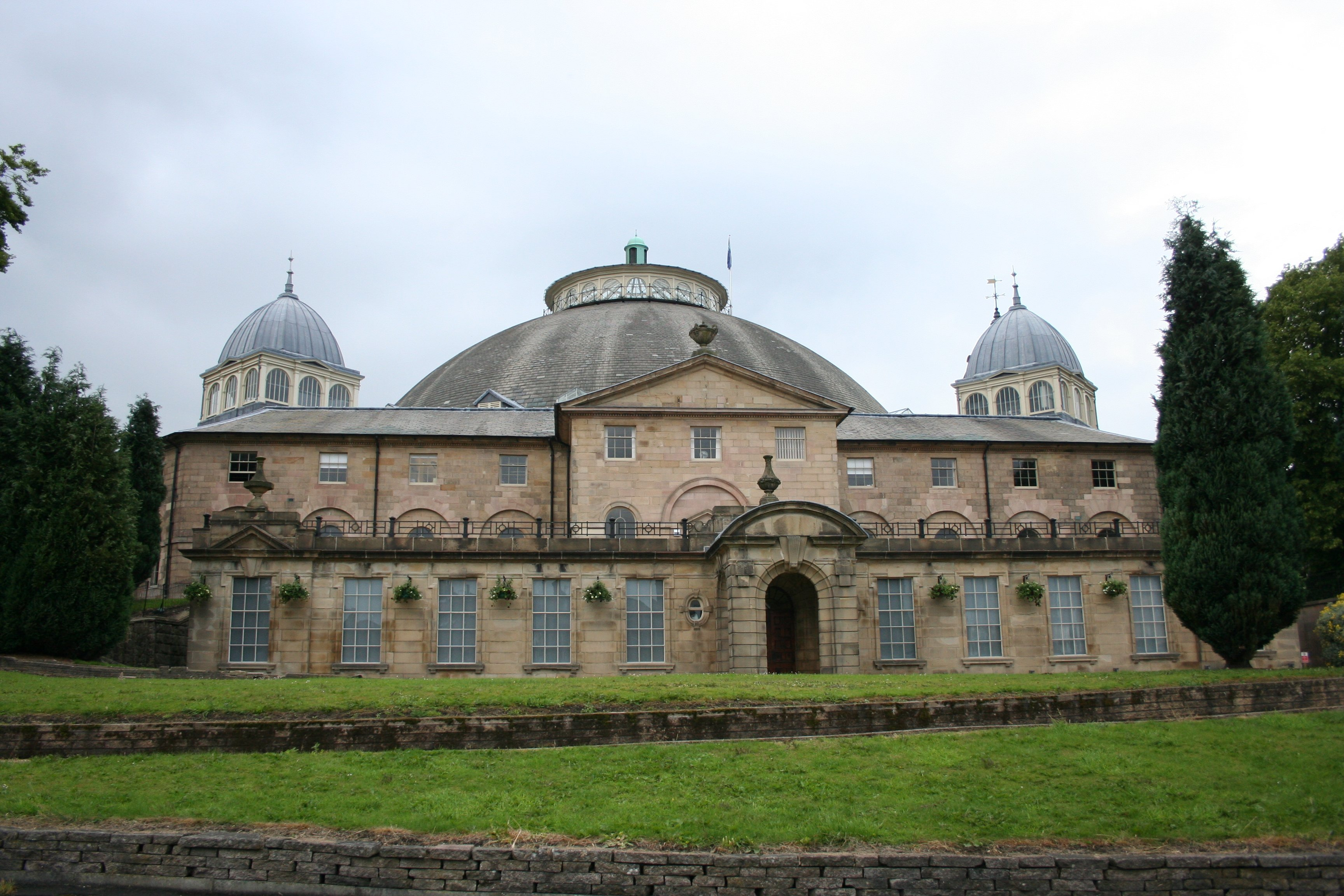
Devonshire Dome

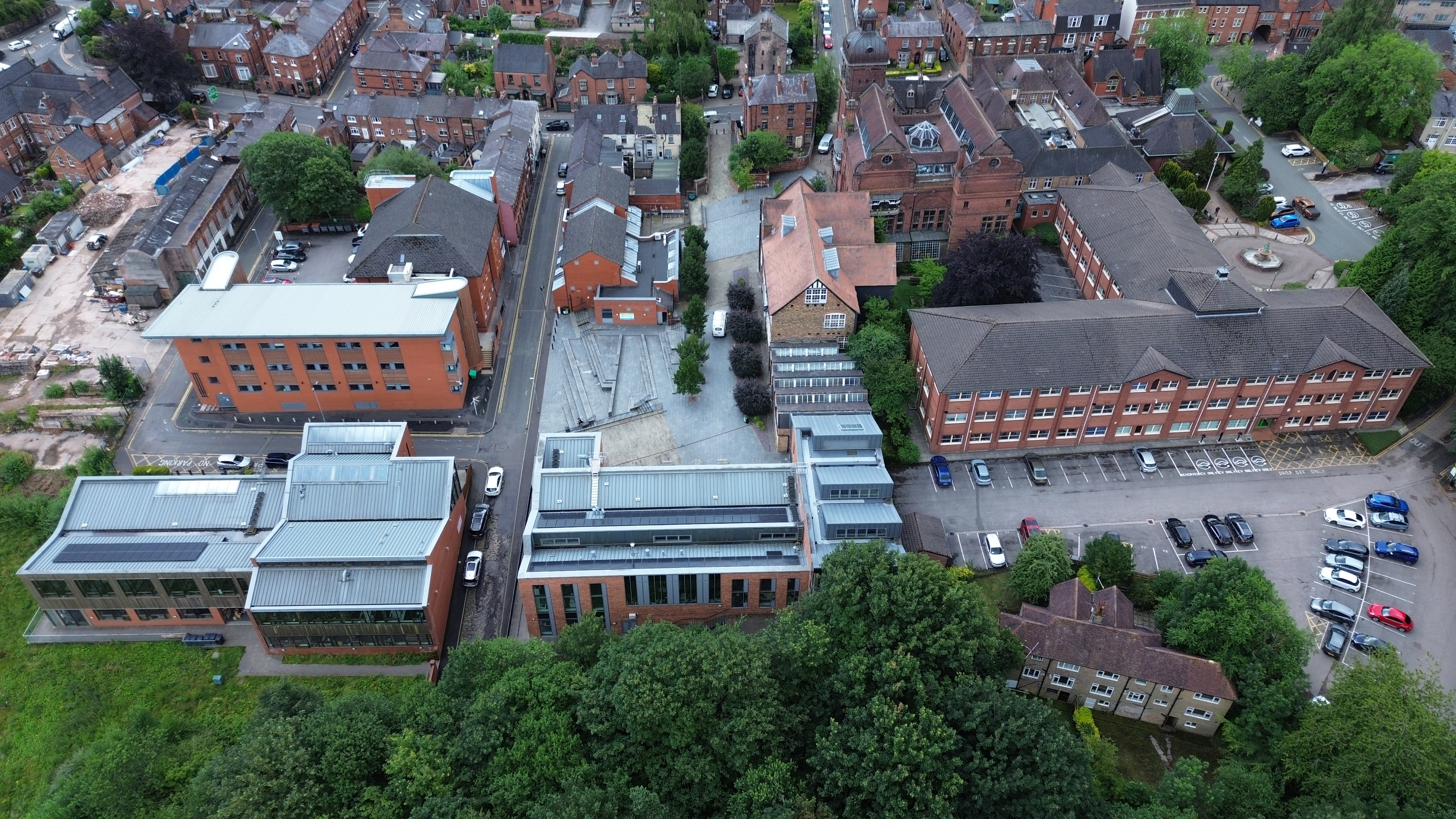
Aerial view of Leek Campus

The Buxton Campus of the college is situated within the Devonshire Dome, with outdoor sports facilities at Northwood House in Buxton (now closed), sports and gym facilities at the former High Peak College site in Harpur Hill (now closed) and a "specialist training centre for Motor Vehicle Engineering and Welding" at Harpur Hill Industrial Estate.

The Leek Campus of the college is situated on Stockwell Street in Leek town centre at the site of what was Leek College. Since the merger with University of Derby the site was extensively re-developed between 2013 and 2015. Older buildings were demolished to make way for new purpose built buildings for art and design, engineering, and construction courses. The £7million cost of the development was funded by the Skills Funding Agency and University of Derby.

In the city of Derby, Buxton & Leek College runs a variety of Access to HE and Foundation programme pathways at the University of Derby's Kedleston Road site (Access to HE is also run at the Buxton and Leek Campuses)

== Courses ==
The college offers academic and vocational courses, including apprenticeships, NVQs, BTECs, GCSEs, Access to HE and HNC/HNDs, as well as a range of short/leisure courses.

A limited number of undergraduate degree programmes are run by the college. These courses are validated by University of Derby and are run at the Buxton and Leek Campuses.

Students can progress onto higher education through the University of Derby or any other university. A bursary of £1000 is available to any Buxton & Leek College student progressing to a degree at the University of Derby.

== Management and governance ==
The college management structure currently includes a senior management team at the top, with curriculum leaders below overseeing operation of courses and subject areas. UOD - Buxton is currently led by Director of the Institute of Education and Skills, Dr Sarah Charles, prior to which (and before the demerger) Heather Marks was in post at Buxton & Leek College as Director of FE & Skills from 1st July 2024 to January 2025 - this was following the retirement of the long-standing Principal, Len Tildsley on 28th March 2024.

The college is governed by a sub-committee of the University of Derby's governing council

The Association of Colleges (AoC) briefs that the running of Buxton & Leek College by the University of Derby has proved 'sustainable’, in an age when other mergers of Further Education Colleges into Universities have failed.

Buxton & Leek College is currently rated as "Good" by Ofsted following an inspection in March 2019
