= Robert Rippon Duke =

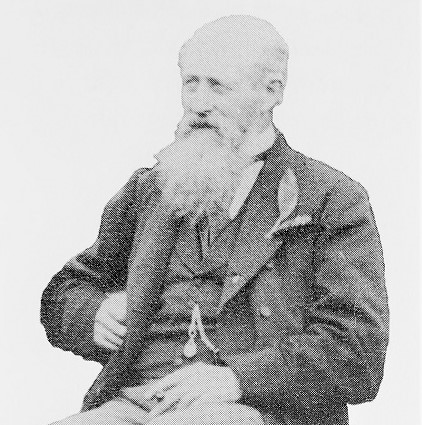
Robert Rippon Duke

Robert Rippon Duke (31 May 1817 – 16 August 1909) was an English architect and surveyor who designed various prominent Victorian buildings in Buxton, Derbyshire.

== Life ==
Duke was born in Hull, the son of a whaler, in 1817.

He moved to Buxton and in 1831 became an apprentice carpenter at Buxton Estate. From 1849 to 1852 he supervised the building of the Royal Hotel (Winster Place) on Spring Gardens. He then formed the Turner and Duke building company with partner Samuel Turner. He was a self-taught draughtsman and established his own architect's practice at 31 Spring Gardens. He was a founder member of the Buxton, Fairfield and Burbage Mechanics and Literary Institute and its president in 1856. His building company collapsed in 1862. In 1863 he was appointed as architect for the 7th Duke of Devonshire's Buxton Estate. He remained in the position of architect, surveyor and building inspector for the Devonshire Estate for 45 years. This work involved the layouts of roads, approving building designs, enforcing covenants and conducting land deals. He was a trustee for the Buxton Bath Charity for 50 years. He sold his architect's business to William Radford Bryden in 1883. In later life Duke suffered from rheumatism and used a wheelchair.

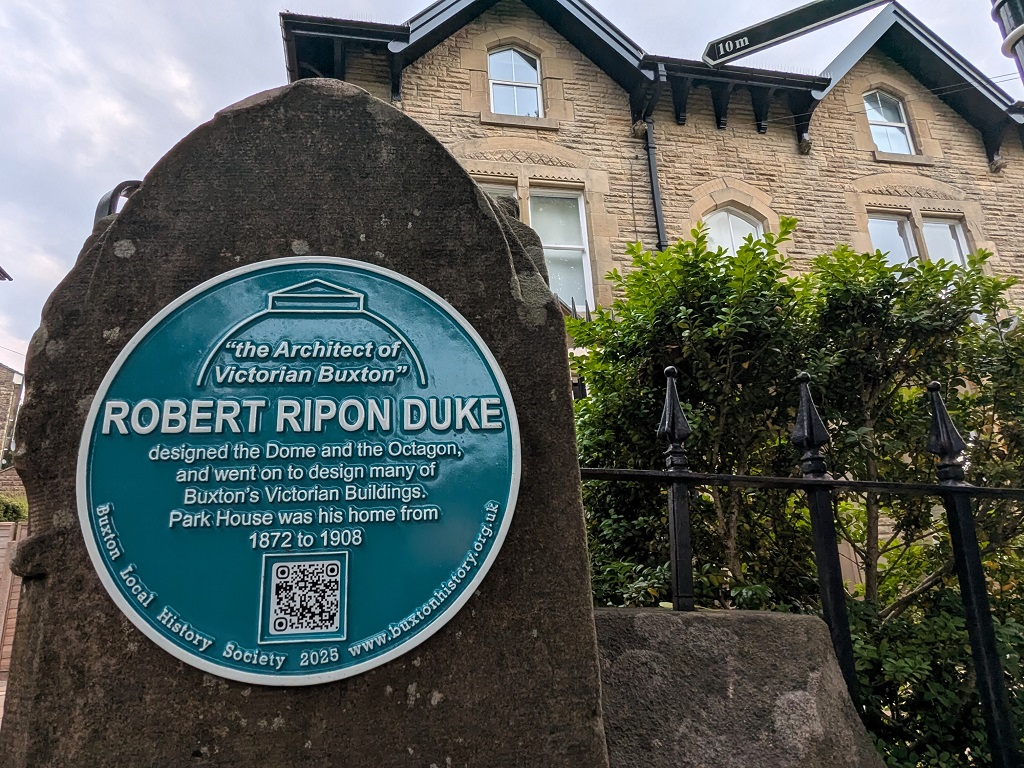
Blue plaque at Park House on Manchester Road

He was a resident at The Square, alongside renowned Buxton water physicians Sir Charles Scudamore and Dr William Henry Robertson. In 1870 he designed his own home Park House on Manchester Road.

== Works ==
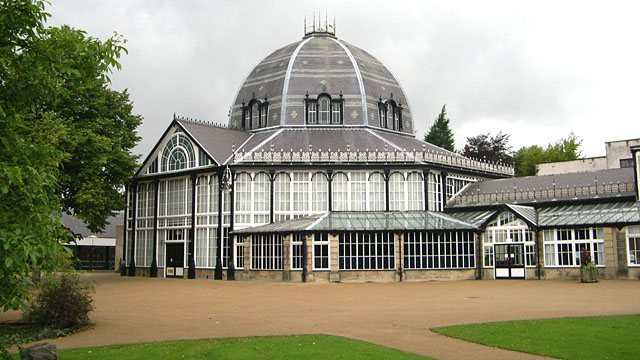
Octagon Concert Hall

Duke designed the Octagon concert hall in Buxton Pavilion Gardens, matching the style of Edward Milner's adjoining pavilion, and it first opened to the public in 1876. It is a glass and cast iron masterpiece of Victorian architecture, situated near the Buxton Opera House (which was designed by Frank Matcham and built in 1903).

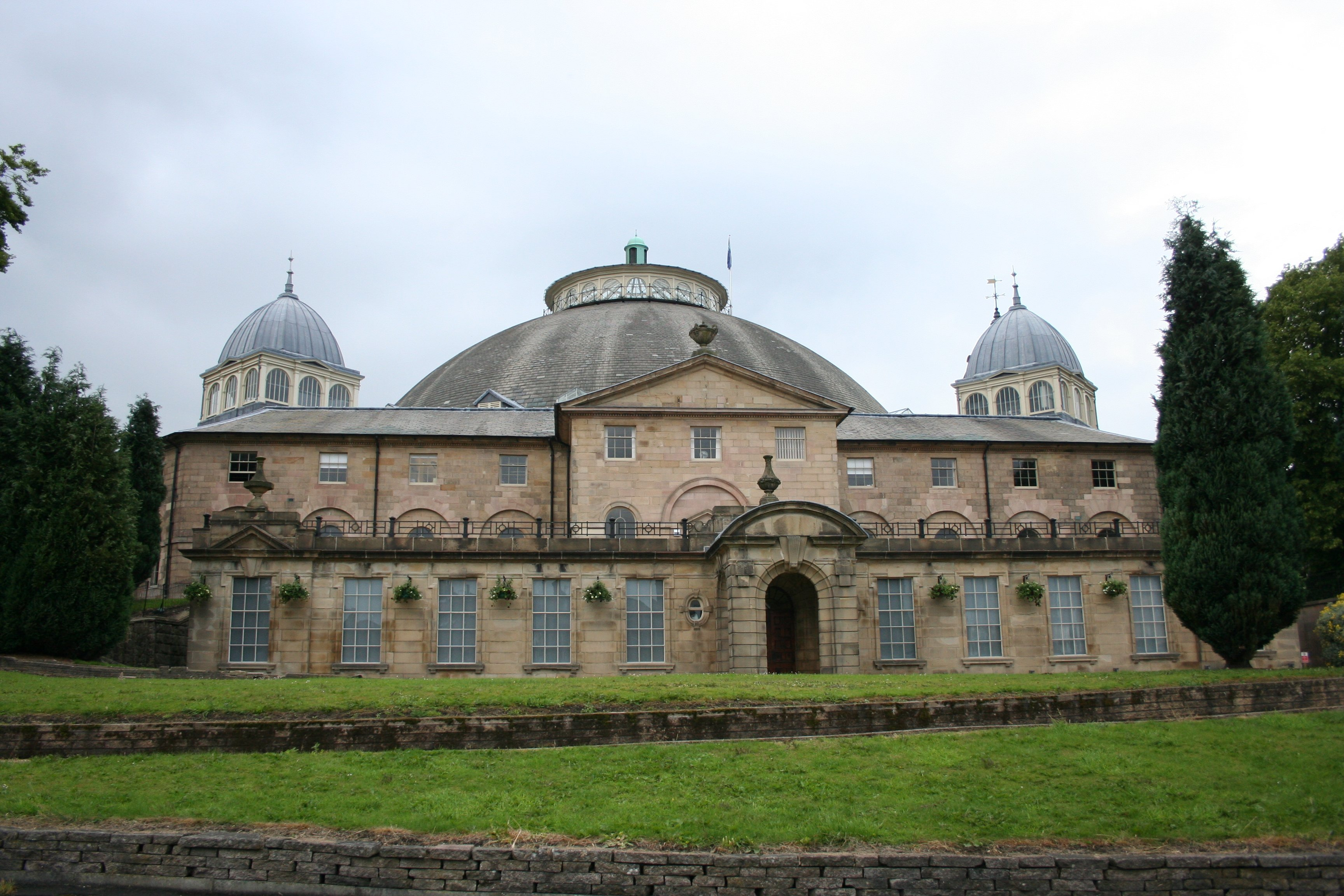
Devonshire Royal Hospital

The other great Buxton building for which Rippon Duke was largely responsible is the Devonshire Dome. Originally a vast octagonal stable block designed by Georgian architect John Carr of York for William Cavendish, 5th Duke of Devonshire to accompany his magnificent Crescent, it has undergone several major transformations. In 1859, the Buxton Bath Charity had persuaded the Duke of Devonshire to allow part of the building - by then accommodating nothing like the 120 horses for which it was designed - to be converted to a charity hospital for the use of the ‘sick poor’ coming in for treatment from the ‘Cottonopolis’ and many towns around. Devonshire estate architect, Henry Currey, architect for St Thomas’s Hospital in London, converted two thirds of the building into a hospital. Then, in 1878, the Buxton Bath Charity trustees under their doughty chairman Dr William Henry Robertson, persuaded the 7th Duke of Devonshire to give them the use of the whole building in exchange for providing new stables elsewhere in the town.

Robert Rippon Duke was commissioned to design a 300-bed hospital to rival Bath and Harrogate for charity medical provision. The Cotton Districts Convalescent fund put up £25,000 for the conversion. Rippon Duke included in his design what was then the world's largest unsupported dome; a vast steel construction clad in slate and comprising 22 curved steel arms. This figure was revised upwards following advice from a railway engineer, Mr Footner, in the 1870s, who retold an account of the Tay Bridge disaster (which collapsed because its structure had not taken into account the stresses of lateral wind and storms). After Rippon Duke's redevelopment in 1881, the Devonshire Royal Hospital had the largest dome in the world at 44 metres (144 ft) in diameter. This exceeded the Pantheon (43m) and St Peter's Basilica (42m) in Rome, and St Paul's Cathedral (34m). The Devonshire Dome and its surrounding Victorian villas are now the Devonshire Campus - a faculty of the University of Derby.

Duke designed the Poole's Cavern Lodge in 1852. He designed Fairfield Wesleyan Chapel in 1868, Trinity Episcopal Church on Hardwick Mount in 1872 and the Burlington Hotel (subsequently The Savoy) at the bottom of Hall Bank in 1874. In the 1860s and 1870s Robert Rippon Duke designed grand Victorian Villas along Cavendish Terrace (now called Broad Walk), Thorncliffe Cottage on Hartington Road, Spring Bank and The Knoll on Marlborough Road and Hamilton and Arnside villas on Devonshire Road. He designed Turner's Memorial drinking fountain in 1879 (in memory of his colleague and friend Samuel Turner), which stands in front of the Hot Baths on Terrace Road. Duke was the Clerk of Works for the Palace Hotel (designed by Henry Currey) and he was the architect for its extensions in 1887. He also designed the Post Office at Cavendish Circus.

R. R. Duke's own building company also built St Anne's Roman Catholic Church on Terrace Road in 1861 and the Congregational Church on Hardwick Mount in 1861 (demolished in 1983).
