= Grade II* listed buildings in High Peak =

There are over 20,000 Grade II* listed buildings in England. This page is a list of these buildings in the district of High Peak in Derbyshire.

== List of buildings ==
Name	Location	Type	Completed (Note: The date given is the date used by Historic England as significant for the initial building or that of an important part in the structure's description.)	Date designated	Grid ref. (Note: Sometimes known as OSGB36, the grid reference is based on the British national grid reference system used by the Ordnance Survey.) Geo-coordinates	Entry number (Note: The "List Entry Number" is a unique number assigned to each listed building and scheduled monument by Historic England.)	Image
Church of St John the Baptist	Bamford	Church	1856–60	21 April 1967	SK2076083376; 53°20′49″N 1°41′23″W	1087859	Church of St John the Baptist More images
Church of St Edmund	Castleton	Church	Early 12th century	21 April 1967	SK1502882901; 53°20′34″N 1°46′33″W	1087866	Church of St Edmund More images
Church of St Thomas of Canterbury	Chapel-en-le-Frith	Church	Early 14th century	21 April 1967	SK0577080827; 53°19′28″N 1°54′53″W	1088062	Church of St Thomas of Canterbury More images
Stodhart Tunnel	Chapel-en-le-Frith	Tunnel	1796	3 September 1985	SK0588081490; 53°19′49″N 1°54′47″W	1334843	Stodhart Tunnel More images
Chinley Independent Chapel	Chinley	Congregational chapel	1711	21 April 1967	SK0552582001; 53°20′06″N 1°55′07″W	1088033	Chinley Independent Chapel More images
Stableblock at Park Hall	Little Hayfield	House	Early 19th century	21 April 1967	SK0380888332; 53°23′31″N 1°56′39″W	1298715	Stableblock at Park Hall More images
Torr Vale Mill, attached weir sluice gates, watercourse walls, headrace arches, retaining walls and steps	New Mills	Mill	circa 1790	23 February 1998	SJ9990385332; 53°21′53″N 2°00′11″W	1119721	Torr Vale Mill, attached weir sluice gates, watercourse walls, headrace arches, retaining walls and steps More images
Canal Warehouse at end of Peak Forest Canal	Whaley Bridge	Canal warehouse	1832	18 December 1972	SK0118681620; 53°19′53″N 1°59′01″W	1088081	Canal Warehouse at end of Peak Forest Canal
St James' Church	Taxal, Whaley Bridge	Church	16th or 17th century	19 September 1977	SK0065379810; 53°18′55″N 1°59′30″W	1088087	St James' Church More images
Church of St Margaret	Wormhill	Church	1864	21 April 1967	SK1245574182; 53°15′52″N 1°48′53″W	1087930	Church of St Margaret More images
Wormhill Hall	Wormhill	Country house	1697	25 October 1951	SK1246074068; 53°15′48″N 1°48′53″W	1146377	Wormhill Hall More images
12 stone urns and linking walls and steps	Buxton	Urns	1818	4 December 1990	SK0584773537; 53°15′32″N 1°54′50″W	1257871	12 stone urns and linking walls and steps More images
Church of St Anne	Buxton	Church	Earlier than 1625	25 January 1951	SK0572272975; 53°15′14″N 1°54′57″W	1259392	Church of St Anne More images
Church of St John the Baptist	Buxton	Church	1802–11	25 January 1951	SK0561773550; 53°15′32″N 1°55′02″W	1258025	Church of St John the Baptist More images
Devonshire Royal Hospital	Buxton	Stable	1785–90	21 December 1970	SK0565173672; 53°15′36″N 1°55′00″W	1259351	Devonshire Royal Hospital More images
Old Hall Hotel	Buxton	Town house	1572	25 January 1951	SK0575473477; 53°15′30″N 1°54′55″W	1257847	Old Hall Hotel More images
Buxton Opera House	Buxton	Opera house	1901–03	21 December 1970	SK0562573485; 53°15′30″N 1°55′02″W	1257789	Buxton Opera House More images
1–6 The Square	Buxton	Apartments	1803–06	25 January 1951	SK0571973512; 53°15′31″N 1°54′57″W	1257843	1–6 The Square More images

== See also ==
- Grade I listed buildings in Derbyshire
- Grade II* listed buildings in Amber Valley
- Grade II* listed buildings in Bolsover (district)
- Grade II* listed buildings in Chesterfield
- Grade II* listed buildings in Derby
- Grade II* listed buildings in Derbyshire Dales
- Grade II* listed buildings in Erewash
- Grade II* listed buildings in North East Derbyshire
- Grade II* listed buildings in South Derbyshire
- Listed buildings in New Mills
