= Devonshire Royal Hospital =

Former hospital in Derbyshire, England

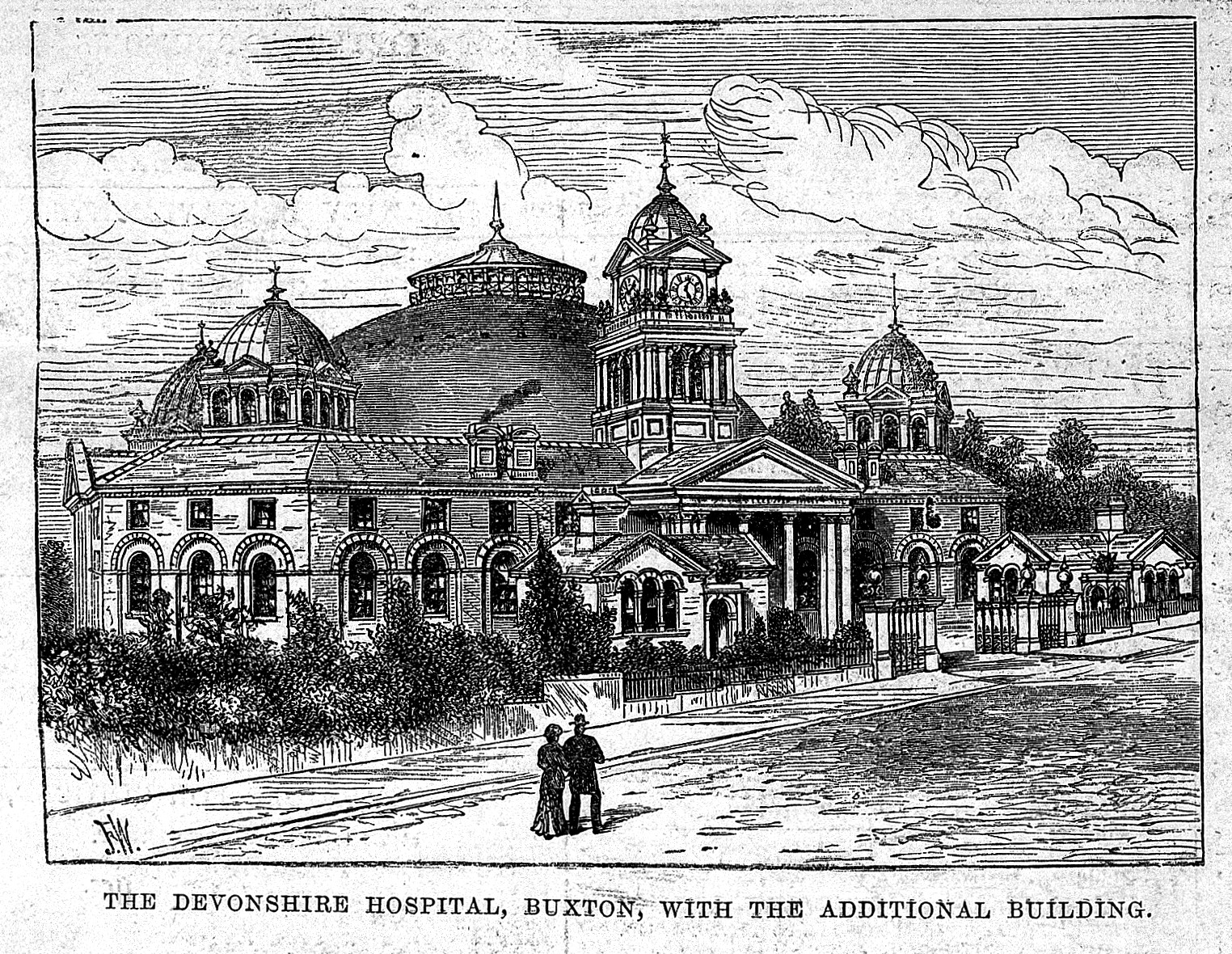
- Devonshire Hospital in the 1800s

- Location in Derbyshire

Geography
- Location: Buxton, Derbyshire, England
- Coordinates: 53.2600°N 1.9168°W

Organisation
- Care system: Buxton Bath Charity
- Type: Hydropathic

Services
- Beds: 300

History
- Founded: 1859

The Devonshire Royal Hospital was established as the Devonshire Hospital in 1859 in Buxton, Derbyshire by the Buxton Bath Charity for the treatment of the poor. The hospital was built in the converted stable block of The Crescent. The building is now known as the Devonshire Dome and it is the site of the Buxton Campus of the University of Derby.

== Buxton Bath Charity ==
The Buxton Bath Charity was founded in 1779 to pay for poor people to have access to the healing waters of Buxton, for the treatment of rheumatism, gout and various other conditions. All visitors to Buxton's hotels and lodging houses were expected to contribute one shilling to the charity and sign the subscription book. In 1822 there were nearly 800 patients admitted through the charity, which paid for board and lodging, medicines and water treatments for up to five weeks. By the 1850s the numbers exceeded 1000. In 1859, the Buxton Bath Charity had persuaded the Duke of Devonshire to allow part of the building (by then accommodating nothing like the 110 horses for which it was designed) to be converted to a charity hospital for the use of the ‘sick poor’ coming in for treatment from the ‘Cottonopolis’ of Lancashire and Yorkshire. The Devonshire estate architect, Henry Currey (who designed St Thomas's Hospital in London), converted two thirds of the Great Stables (built by John Carr of York) into a hospital with 120 beds for the poor. The charity became The Devonshire Hospital and Buxton Bath Charity.

Sir Charles Scudamore and Dr William Henry Robertson were both honorary physicians for the charity and in 1865 Dr Robertson became chairman of The Devonshire Hospital and Buxton Bath Charity.

== Devonshire Dome ==
In 1879, the Buxton Bath Charity trustees persuaded William Cavendish, 7th Duke of Devonshire to give them the use of the whole building in exchange for providing new stables elsewhere in the town. Local architect Robert Rippon Duke was commissioned to design a hospital to rival Bath's and Harrogate's facilities for charity medical care. The stables on the ground floor were converted into hospital rooms by 1882. Included in Rippon Duke's design was the world's largest unsupported dome with a diameter of 44 metres (144 ft), now known as the Devonshire Dome. 300 hospital beds "for the relief of the poor" were now accommodated in the building. The Cotton Districts Convalescent fund put up £25,000 for the conversion. By 1882 the hospital had its own baths building in George Street, although these were closed in 1914 when new mineral baths were built on the hospital site. Further changes were undertaken, with the clock tower (a tribute to the hospital's chairman Dr William Henry Robertson) and lodge completed in 1882, the Jubilee surgical wards in 1897 and the dining room and kitchens extension in 1921.

King Edward VII (a friend of the 8th Duke of Devonshire) and Queen Alexandra came to Buxton in 1905 to tour the Devonshire Hospital and Buxton Bath Charity. The royals also visited the Thermal and Natural Baths and the Pavilion Gardens.

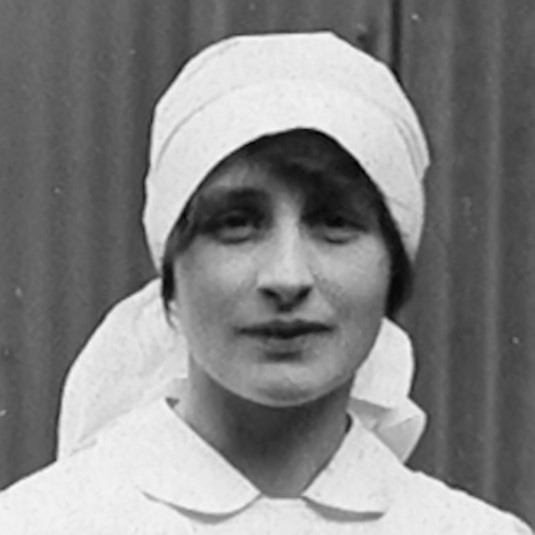
VAD nurse Vera Brittain

Vera Brittain (author of Testament of Youth) trained as a Voluntary Aid Detachment nurse at the Devonshire Hospital in 1915, caring for soldiers wounded during World War I. Over 5,000 soldiers were treated in Buxton.

In 1934 the establishment was give permission by King George V to become known as the Devonshire Royal Hospital.

== National Health Service ==
The Buxton Bath Charity was incorporated into the National Health Service in 1948 and from then the Devonshire Royal Hospital provided treatments for acute conditions, rheumatism and allied diseases, orthopaedics and rehabilitation.

The Devonshire Royal Hospital was the last of the eight hydropathic hospitals in England to close, in 2000.

There are currently two hospitals in Buxton: the Cavendish Hospital (opened in 1967) for various services including geriatric healthcare and the Buxton Cottage Hospital (opened in 1912) for minor injuries.

== See also ==
- Grade II* listed buildings in High Peak
- Listed buildings in Buxton
