= Devonshire Dome =

Building in Buxton, Derbyshire

The Devonshire Dome
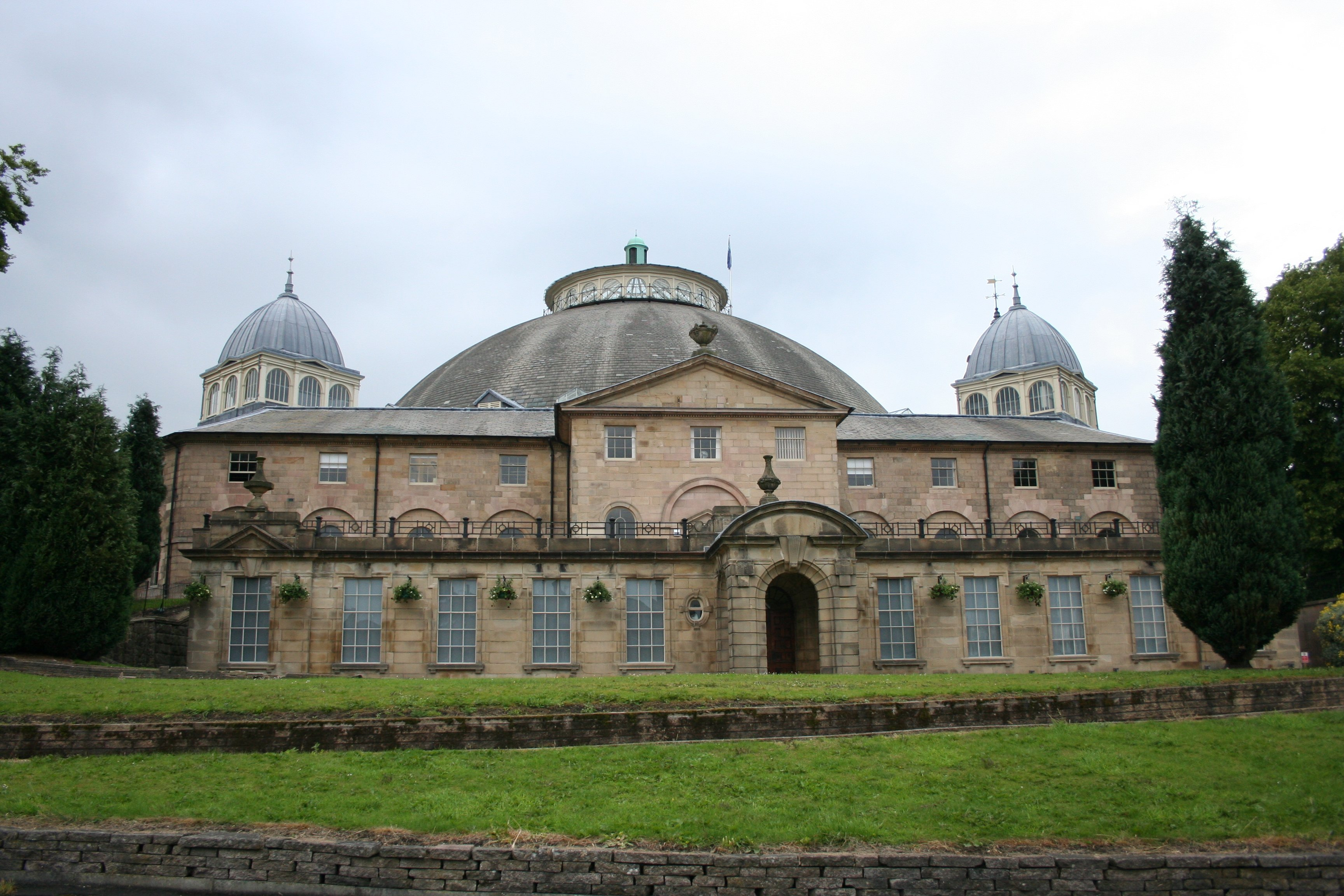

- Location within Derbyshire
- Former names: The Great Stables, Devonshire Royal Hospital

General information
- Location: Buxton, Derbyshire
- Coordinates: 53.2600°N 1.9168°W
- Ordnance Survey: SK0565173672
- Construction started: 1780
- Completed: 1789
- Renovated: 1858, Henry Currey; 1881, Robert Rippon Duke; 2001-3, University of Derby
- Renovation cost: £4.7 million (2001–03)
- Client: William Cavendish, 5th Duke of Devonshire
- Owner: University of Derby

Dimensions
- Diameter: 44.2 metres (145 ft)

Technical details
- Floor area: 1,534 square metres (16,510 ft^{2})

Design and construction
- Architect: John Carr

Website
- Devonshire Dome; University of Derby, Buxton Campus

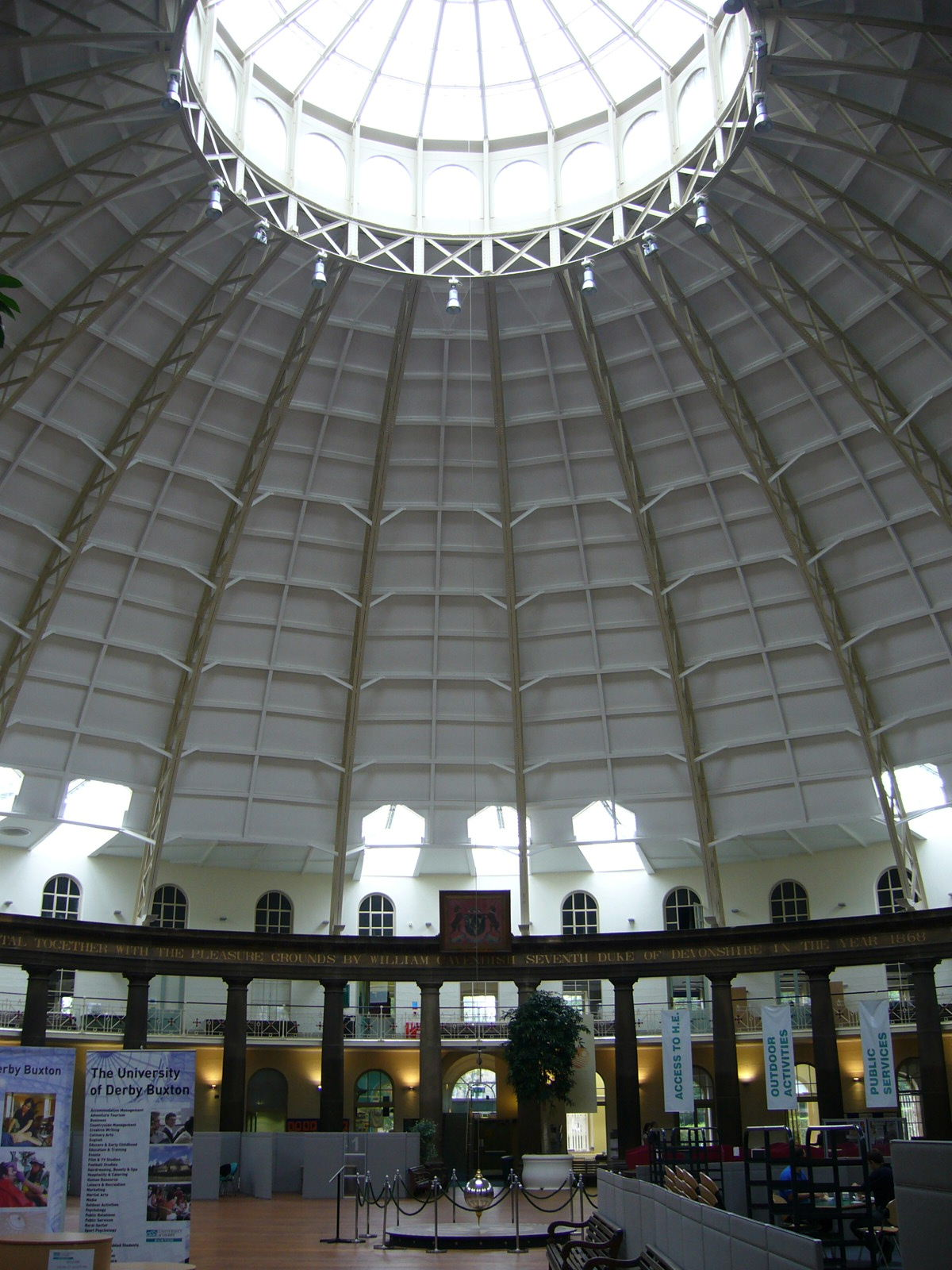
Interior

The Devonshire Dome building (previously known as the Devonshire Royal Hospital) is a Grade II* listed 18th-century former stable block in Buxton, Derbyshire. It was built by John Carr of York and extended by architect Robert Rippon Duke, who added what was then the world's largest unsupported dome, with a diameter of 44.2 metres (145 ft). It is now the site of the Buxton Campus of the University of Derby.

== History ==
=== 1780–1850s: Stables ===
Built between 1780 and 1789, the original building was designed by John Carr of York for William Cavendish, 5th Duke of Devonshire. Octagonal in shape, it housed up to 120 horses and the servants of the guests of the Crescent Hotel, built in combination as part of the plan to promote Buxton as a spa town. The interior façade was described as an almost exact copy of The Palace of Christian Kings at the Alhambra in Granada.

=== 1859–2000: Hospital ===
In 1859, the Buxton Bath Charity had persuaded the Duke of Devonshire to allow part of the building – by then accommodating nothing like the 110 horses for which it was designed – to be converted to a charity hospital for the use of the ‘sick poor’ coming in for treatment from the ‘Cottonopolis’ of Lancashire and Yorkshire. The Devonshire estate architect, Henry Currey, architect for St Thomas's Hospital in London, converted two thirds of the building into a hospital.

In 1881, the Buxton Bath Charity trustees, under their chairman Dr William Henry Robertson, persuaded William Cavendish, 7th Duke of Devonshire to give them the use of the whole building in exchange for providing new stables elsewhere in the town. Local architect Robert Rippon Duke was commissioned to design a 300-bed hospital to rival Bath and Harrogate for charity medical provision. The Cotton Districts Convalescent Fund put up £25,000 for the conversion. The steel structure was clad in slate, and proposed to be supported by 22 curved steel arms. However, during construction the Tay Bridge disaster occurred on 28 December 1879, and so the number of arms was revised upwards.

Included in Rippon Duke's design what was the world's largest unsupported dome with a diameter of 44.2 metres (145 ft); it surpassed that of the Pantheon (43 metres/141 ft) and St Peter's Basilica (42 metres/138 ft) in Rome, and St Paul's Cathedral (34 metres/112 ft). Overtaken by the West Baden Springs Hotel designed by Harrison Albright in 1902 (59.45 metres/195.0 ft), the record is now routinely surpassed today by space frame domes, such as the Georgia Dome (256 metres/840 ft), but the Devonshire is still the largest unsupported dome in the UK. The dome has a floor area of 1,534 square metres (16,510 sq ft).

Further changes were undertaken, with the clock tower (a tribute to the hospital's chairman Dr William Henry Robertson) and lodge completed in 1882, surgical wards in 1897, spa baths in 1913, and the dining room and kitchens in 1921. The building became known as the Devonshire Royal Hospital in 1934. It was the last of the eight hydropathic hospitals in England to close, in 2000.

=== 2001–2022: University campus ===
On 31 January 2001, the University of Derby acquired the Devonshire Dome and associated surrounding buildings. The university received £4.7m from the Heritage Lottery Fund for the restoration and redevelopment project.

Refurbished and reopened in 2003, the main building and its surrounding Victorian era villas became part of the University of Derby. The Devonshire Dome functioned as a campus of the University and of Buxton & Leek College, and as a commercial venue and visitor attraction.

As a university campus, it was the base for the University of Derby's degree programmes in Outdoor Leadership and Adventure Sports Coaching, Events Management, Hospitality Management, Tourism Management, Professional Culinary Arts and Spa & Wellness Management.

On 23 October 2015, the venue played host to Jack Massey's defeat of Gogita Gorgiladze for the vacant WBC Youth Silver Title.

Open to the public on Saturdays and selected Sundays during term time and Wednesday to Sunday outside of term time, the space housed Harpur's Bistro and Salon both run by students, classrooms and study spaces. On rare occasions, visitors could observe the swing of a Foucault pendulum during certain times of the year.

=== 2022–present: present: College campus, venue and attraction ===
In October 2019, the University announced that the dome would cease to be a campus for university courses from 2022, when the Outdoors, Adventure, Spa and Wellness courses would close and the rest of Centre for Contemporary Hospitality and Tourism courses would move to the university's main campus in Derby. The dome continues to be an education campus for Buxton & Leek College.

As a commercial venue, it was formerly used for large weddings, and has hosted celebrity weddings, including that of Hollyoaks star Kieron Richardson, until it closed to external events in 2024. In 2025, the Devonshire Spa inside the Dome closed to the public.
