= William Henry Robertson (physician) =

British physician

William Henry Robertson (15 September 1810 – 15 July 1897) was an English physician and a leading figure behind the development of Buxton as a Victorian spa resort.

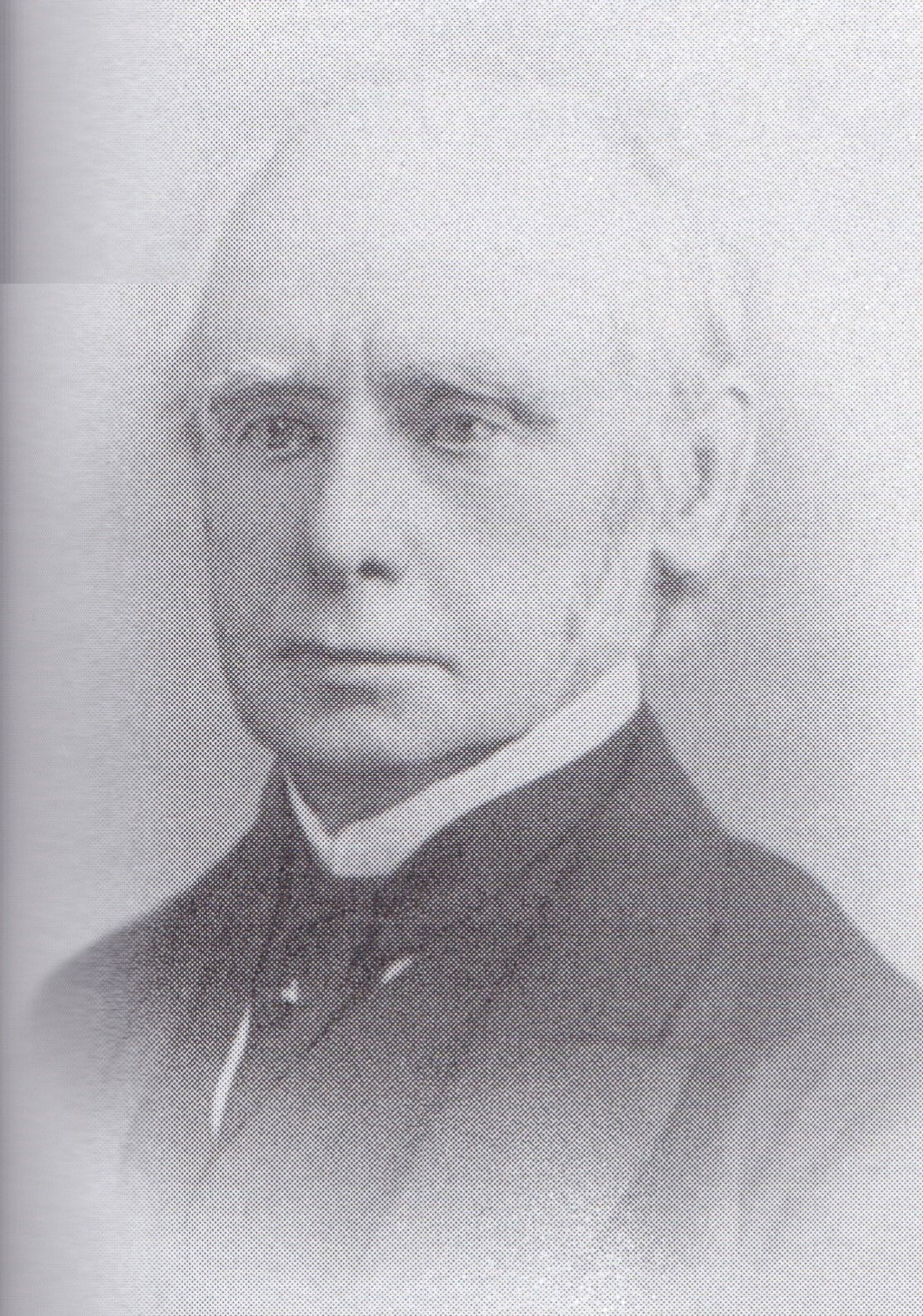
Dr William Henry Robertson

== Biography ==
He was born in London and graduated in medicine at the University of Edinburgh in 1830. After practising as a doctor for a short time at Chesterfield, he settled permanently in Buxton, Derbyshire.

William married Eliza Gill in 1836 and they had a daughter Elizabeth and two sons, William and Gordon.

== Water medicine in Buxton ==
Robertson came to Buxton in 1835. He wrote the definitive tourist guidebook to Buxton in 1854.

He studied the effects of the local mineral waters on disease and promoted their value in the treatment of gout, rheumatism, sciatica, etc. His Guide To The Use Of The Buxton Waters ran to 24 editions.

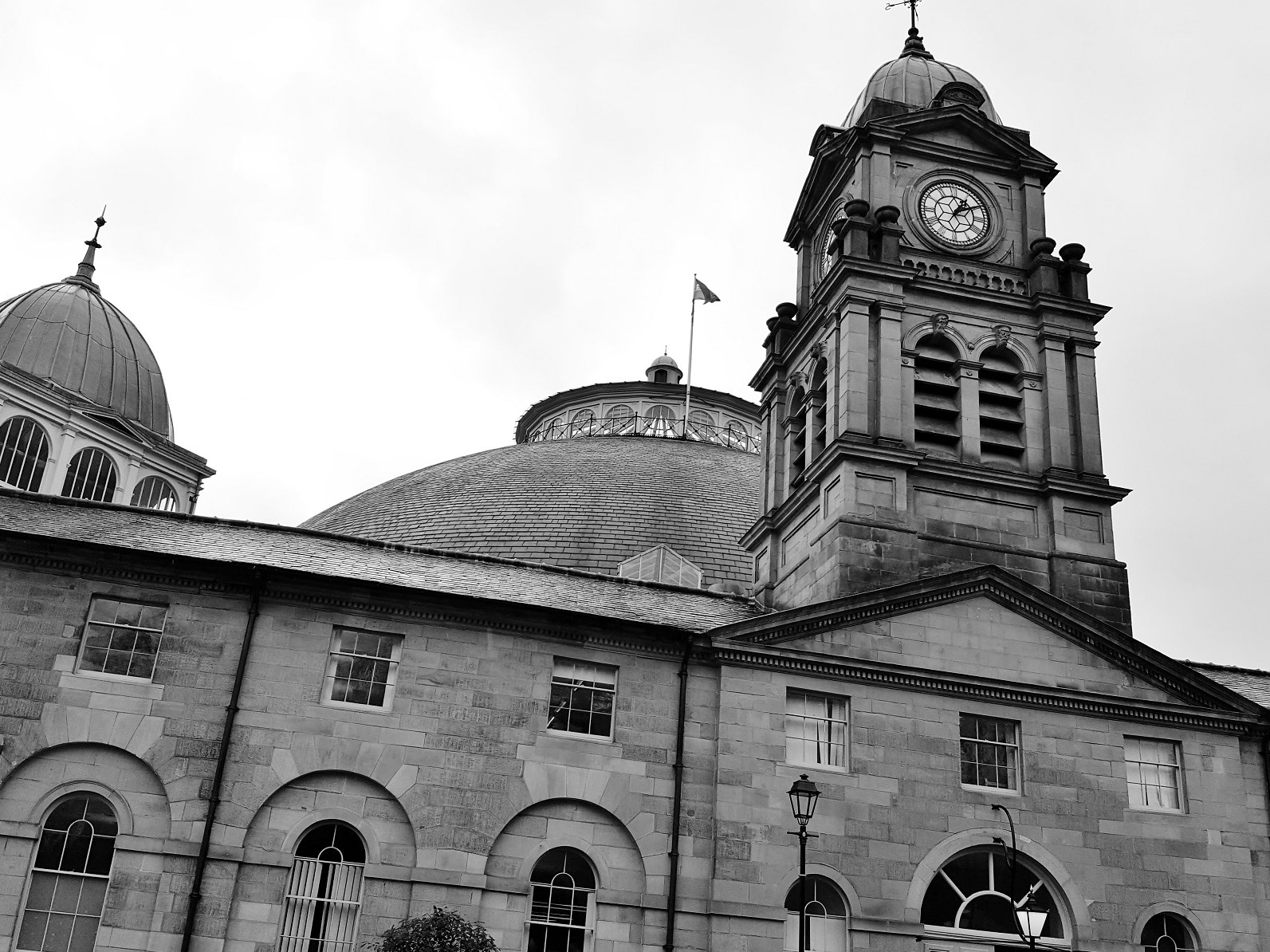
Robertson Clock Tower on Devonshire Dome

He was appointed as an honorary physician to the Buxton Bath Charity in 1836 alongside Sir Charles Scudamore. From 1865 he became the chairman of trustees and board of management of the Devonshire Hospital and Buxton Bath Charity.

He was elected as a Fellow of the Royal College of Physicians in 1872.

In 1881, the Buxton Bath Charity trustees (under his chairmanship) persuaded William Cavendish (7th Duke of Devonshire) to give them the use of the whole Devonshire stables building in exchange for providing new stables elsewhere in the town. The clock tower of the Devonshire Dome (by Robert Rippon Duke) was named in his honour.

== Life in Buxton ==
He lived and practised at No. 6 The Square from 1861 until his death in 1897.

He was chairman of the Buxton Improvements Company and of the trustees of Buxton College. He was also churchwarden at St John the Baptist Church for 30 years.

He qualified as a magistrate in 1867 and served on the bench in Buxton for 30 years.

Robertson Road in Buxton was named after him.

== Selected publications ==
- Buxton and its Waters (1838)
- The Nature and Treatment of Gout (1845)
- A Guide to the Use of the Buxton Waters (1847)
- A Hand-Book of the Peak of Derbyshire (1886)
