= St John the Baptist Church, Buxton =

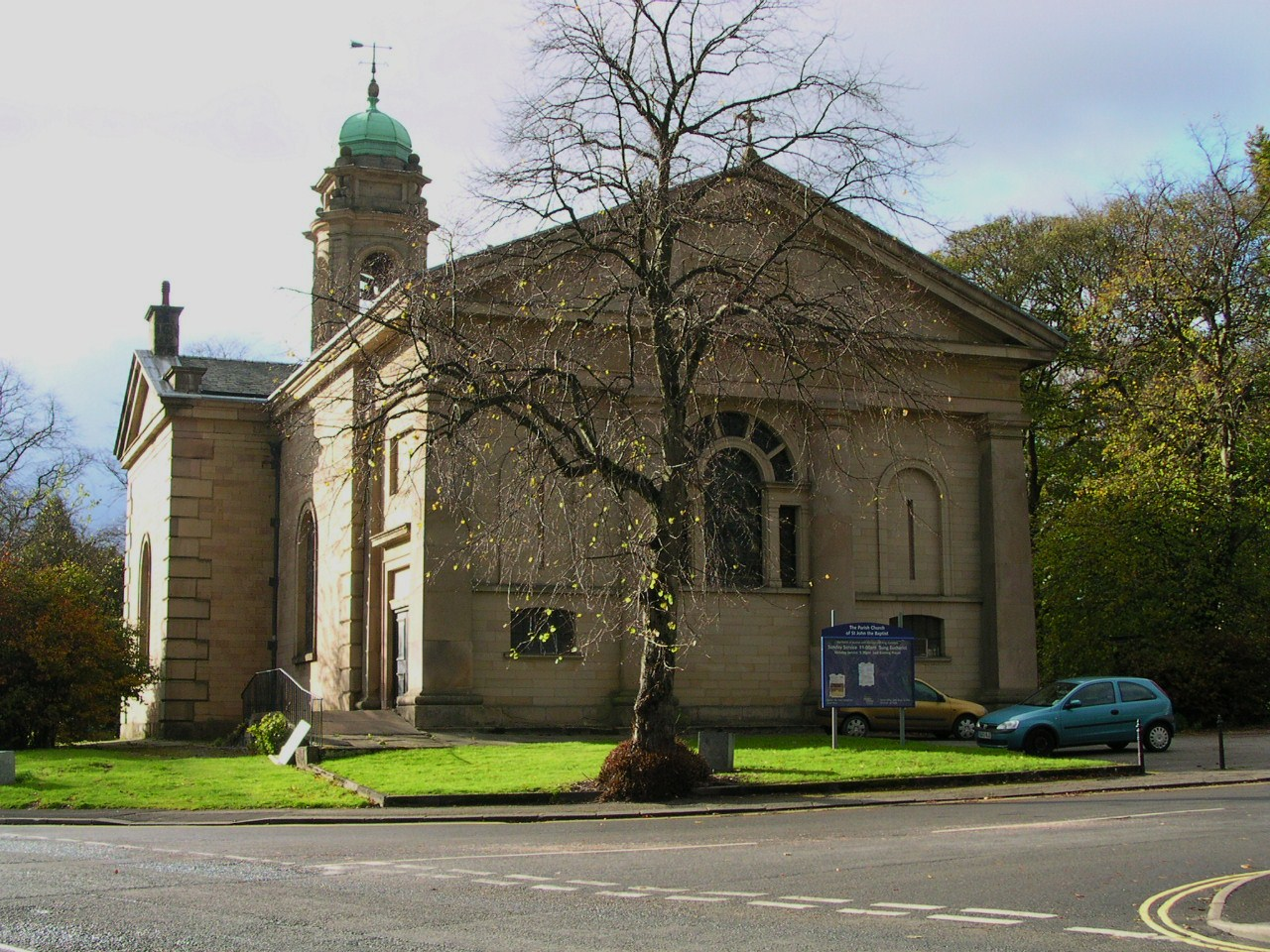
- St John the Baptist Church, Buxton
- St John the Baptist Church, Buxton
- 53°15′32.13″N 1°55′2.21″W
- OS grid reference: SK 05617 73550
- Location: Buxton, Derbyshire
- Country: England
- Denomination: Church of England

History
- Dedication: Saint John the Baptist

Architecture
- Heritage designation: Grade II* listed

Administration
- Province: Canterbury
- Diocese: Derby
- Archdeaconry: Chesterfield
- Deanery: Peak Deanery
- Parish: Buxton

St John the Baptist Church is a Grade II* listed parish church in the Church of England in Buxton, Derbyshire.

== History ==
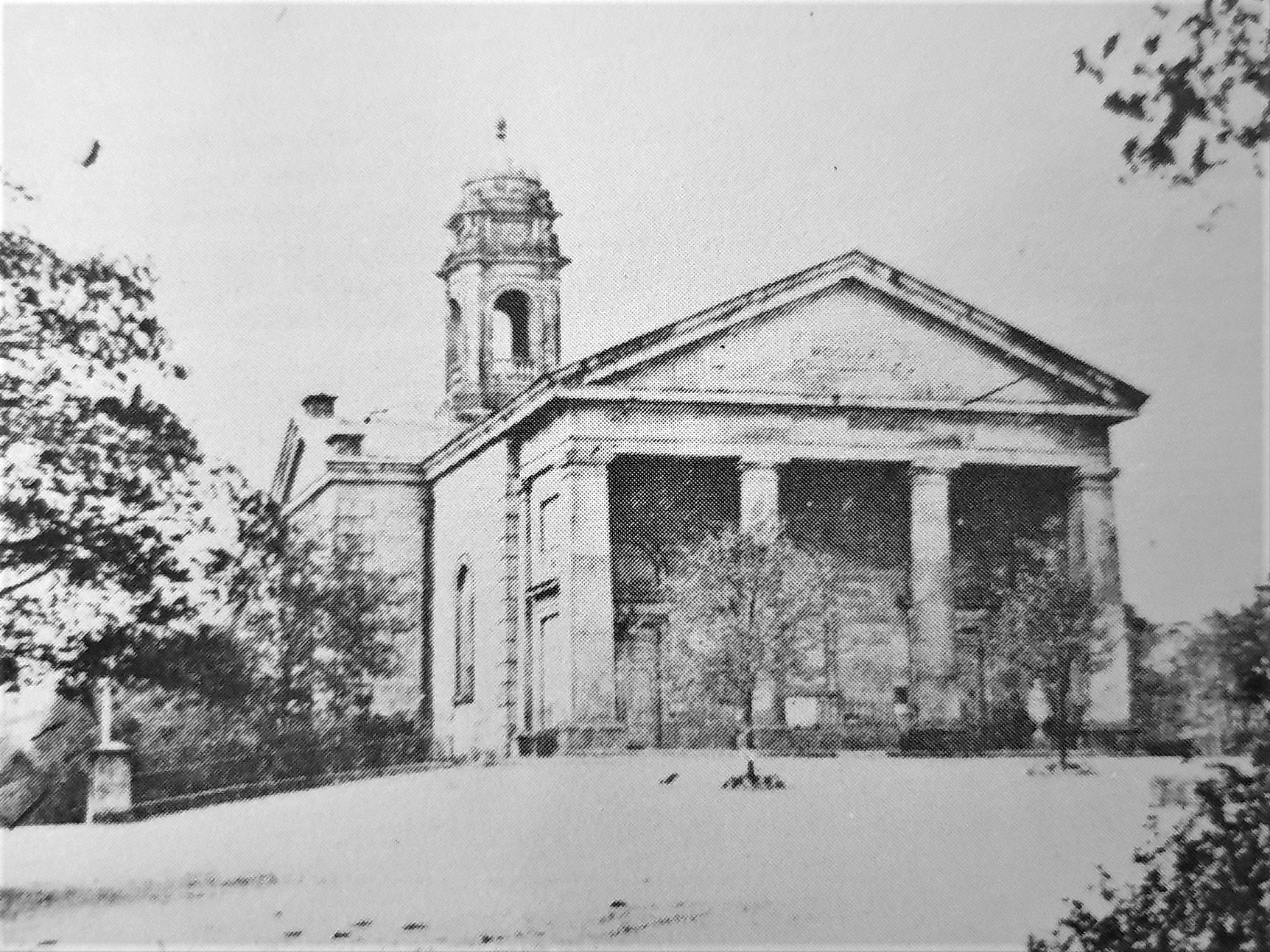
St John's Buxton original East Entrance

The church on St John's Road was designed in the Neo-Classical Regency style by John White. It was built between 1802 and 1811 through the patronage of William Cavendish, 5th Duke of Devonshire. It is constructed from Ashlar gritstone with a slate roof. In 1896 the architect Sir Authur Blomfield redesigned the nave and the original east portico was enclosed to form the chancel. The large pediment on the facade is supported by undecorated Tuscan-style columns and is inscribed prominently with MDCCCXI. The stained glass windows include several by the Victorian designer Charles Eamer Kempe.

St John's Church became the town's new Anglican church (for the growing numbers of residents and visitors, close to the popular spa baths), succeeding St Anne's Church in Higher Buxton, which was later converted into a school. St John's initially served the parish of Fairfield until the parish of Buxton was created in 1898.

The church is used as an arts venue during the annual Buxton International Festival.

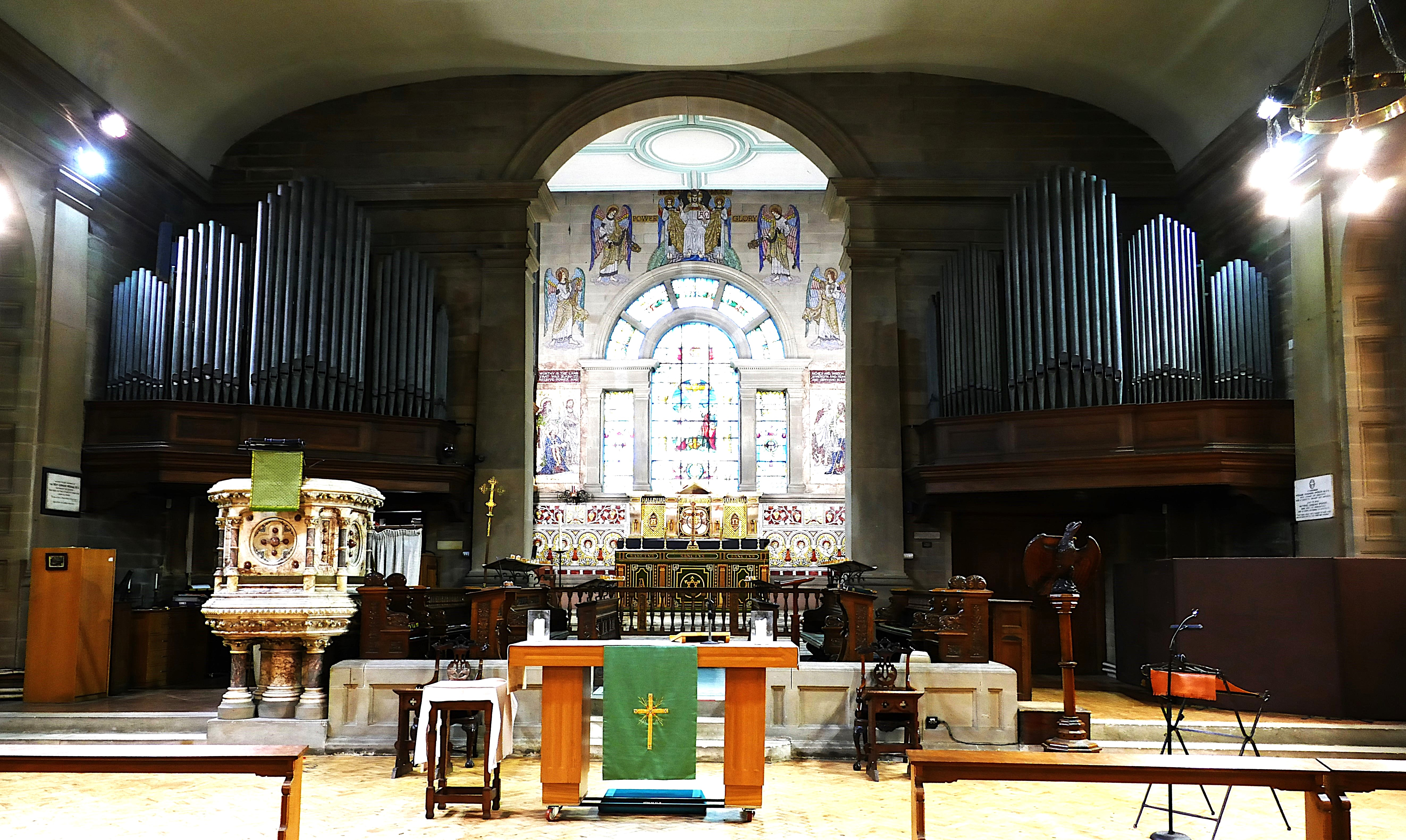
Chancel

== Parish status ==
The church is in a joint parish with

- Christ Church, Burbage
- Christ Church, King Sterndale
- St Anne's Church, Buxton
- St James' Church, Buxton
- St Mary's Church, Buxton

== Organ ==
The organ was installed by William Hill & Son of London in 1897. A specification of the organ can be found on the National Pipe Organ Register.

== Historical perspective ==
Anne Lister visited here on 16 August 1816, and wrote, "At a little distance is the church, one of the neatest and most beautiful little buildings of the kind I ever saw. It has not been finished long, and is of fine free stone like the Crescent, the walls the same within as without, the plain stone looking infinitely better than any plaster, paint, or whitewash, tho' some think the appearance cold – the 2 interior doors are thro' a sort of porch, supported by 4 handsome Ionic columns [sic], each of one block. Perhaps it is the only church of the kind in England and is universally admired."

== See also ==
- Grade II* listed buildings in High Peak
- Listed buildings in Buxton
