= Old Hall Hotel =

Grade II* listed building in Derbyshire, England

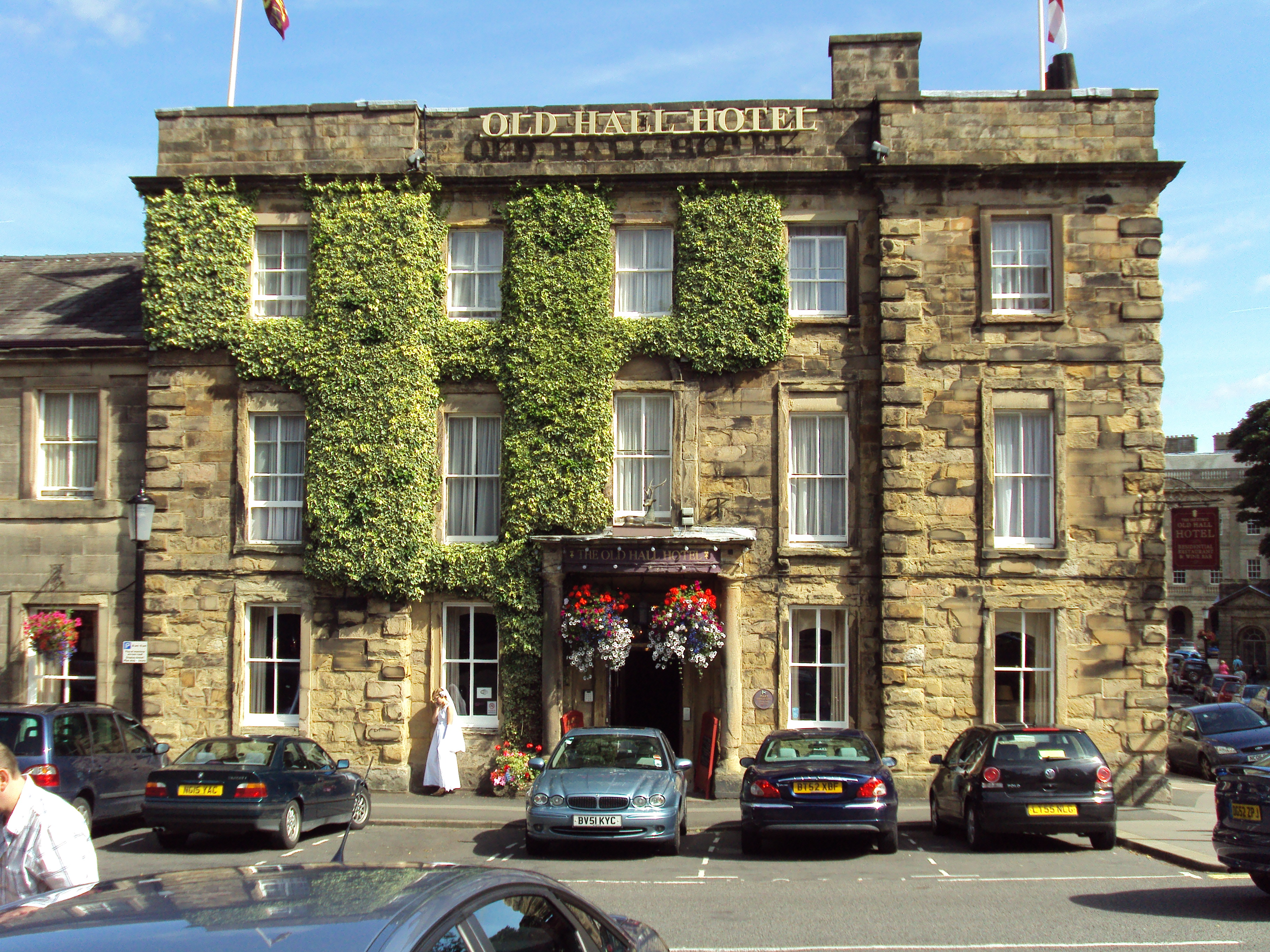
- The hall was rebuilt in 1670

- Location within Derbyshire

General information
- Location: Buxton, Derbyshire, England
- Coordinates: 53.2582°N 1.9153°W
- Ordnance Survey: SK0575473477
- Construction started: 1573
- Completed: 1670

Design and construction
- Designations: Grade II listed

The Old Hall Hotel is a hotel in Buxton, Derbyshire, England, and is one of the oldest buildings in the town. It is a Grade II* listed building.

The current building dates from the Restoration period, and was built around and incorporating an earlier fortified tower.

According to the Derbyshire Archeological Journal (1994): "In the national context, the survival of a building which accommodated both Mary Queen of Scots and much of the Elizabethan nobility is of considerable note. Its importance in architectural terms is further enhanced as it is believed to be the earliest known British building of cross-axial form."

== History of the building ==
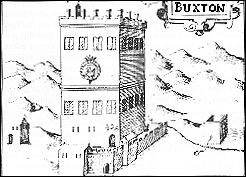
The tower, as depicted on a map from 1610

Since at least the Middle Ages, a hall has stood on this site by the warm spring for which Buxton water is known. The oldest part of the current building was once part of a four-storey fortified tower, built in 1572 by Bess of Hardwick and her fourth husband, George Talbot, 6th Earl of Shrewsbury.

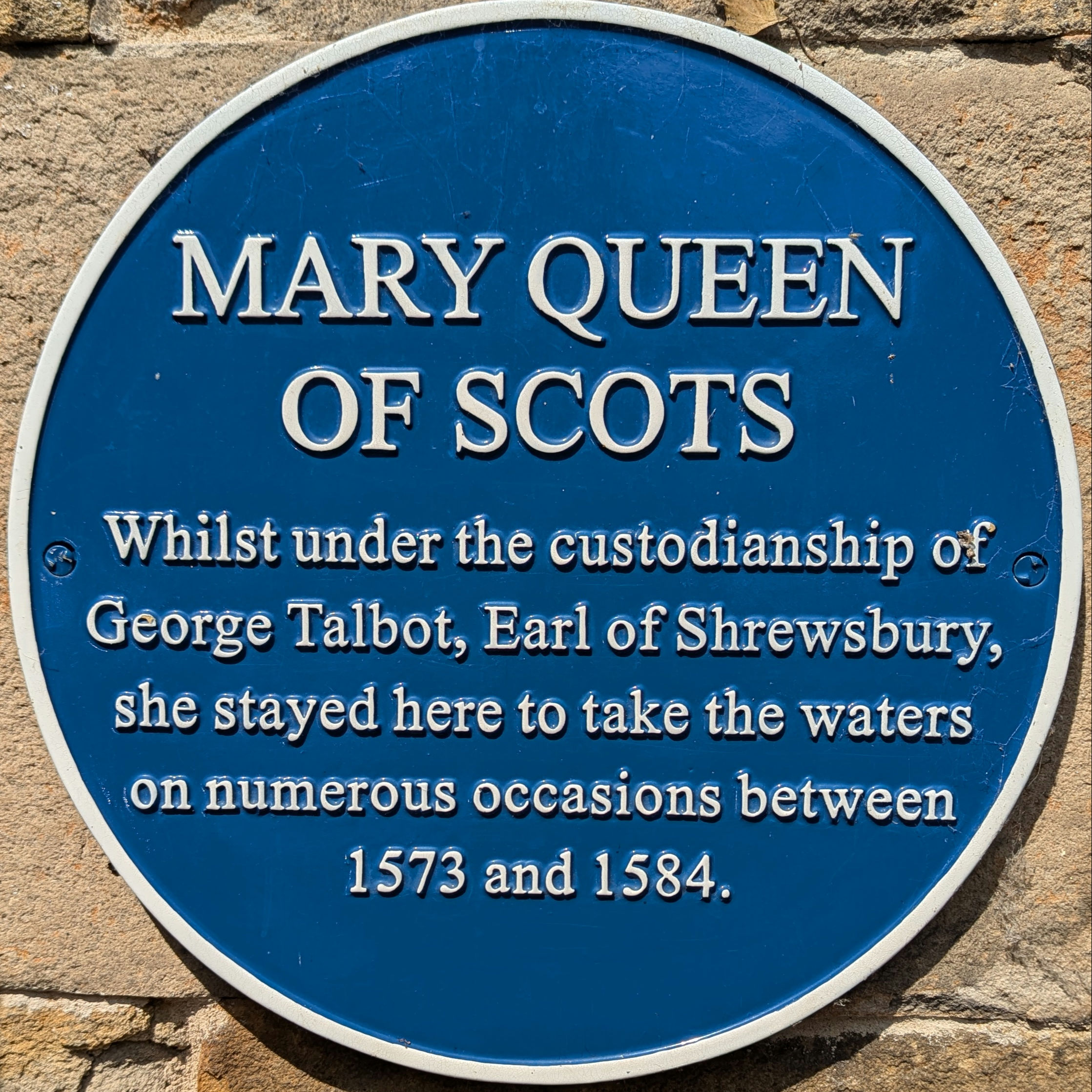
A blue plaque about Mary, Queen of Scots staying at the Old Hall Hotel, reading "MARY QUEEN OF SCOTS: Whilst under the custodianship of George Talbot, Earl of Shrewsbury, she stayed here to take the waters on numerous occasions between 1573 and 1584."

The tower was used at times between 1573 and 1584 to house Mary, Queen of Scots, whilst she was in the custody of the Earl on the orders of Queen Elizabeth I. According to Doctor John Jones of Derby, author of Buxtone's Bathes Benefyte (1572), the tower was a lodging, purpose-built for those taking the waters. Visitors to Shrewsbury's "goodly house" enjoyed a game of table bowls known as trou madame. Women guests had their own bench for the game, the men could play in a gallery. In fine weather they could play bowls outside in an alley or practice archery and other exercises.

Her last visit to Buxton was in the summer of 1584. It is claimed that it was Mary who inscribed the following couplet to Buxton on a window pane:

Buxton, whose warm waters have made thy name famous, perchance I shall visit thee no more – Farewell.

The inscription can still be seen in the window of room 26. Other inscriptions, now lost, were recorded by a contemporary.

The Hall was rebuilt by one of Bess of Hardwick's descendants, the first of five Dukes of Devonshire, in 1670.

== Use as a hotel ==
By 1727, the Old Hall had become a hotel, the only one in Buxton, where the writer Daniel Defoe stayed on his tour of Great Britain. Of the Hall he wrote: "The Duke of Devonshire ... has built a large handsome house at the bath, where there is convenient lodging, and very good provisions, and an ordinary well served for one shilling per head; but it is but one."

By the time that the nearby Georgian Crescent was built (1780–86), Buxton had become an established spa town; and the Old Hall had become a fashionable hotel for the Georgian aristocracy taking the waters. In 1791 one James Cumming (father of the noted chemist James Cumming) leased what was then called Buxton Hall Hotel from William Cavendish, 5th Duke of Devonshire in 1791. He was considered socially more than a mere hotelier, and the hotel's clientele included bishops and visiting aristocracy. The Old Hall has served as a hotel ever since.

== See also ==
- Grade II* listed buildings in High Peak
- Listed buildings in Buxton
