= Lost buildings of Buxton =

List of former notable buildings in Buxton, Derbyshire

This is a partial list of prominent buildings in Buxton, Derbyshire which have been demolished or ruined.

Image	Name	Location	Description
	The Angel Hotel	Spring Gardens	Dating from at least 1773, it was demolished in 1849 when Winster Place (the Royal Hotel) was built on Spring Gardens.
	Buxton Hydro Hotel (later the Spa Hotel)	Hartington Road	A large, grand spa establishment with 260 rooms. Built as an extension of Malvern House Hydropathic (opened in 1866) and renamed Buxton Hydropathic in 1899. It became the Granville Military Hospital in World War I. During World War II it was used as offices and accommodation by the evacuated Norwich Union Insurance Society. The building was demolished in 1973 for the development of housing.
	Buxton Old Hall (1573)	The Crescent	Built in 1573 by the 6th Earl of Shrewsbury. The hall was replaced in 1670 by the 3rd Earl of Devonshire and the building still stands as the Old Hall Hotel.
	Cavendish Girls High School	Corbar Road	Built as Wye House Asylum in 1859 (designed by architect Henry Currey). It became Cavendish School in 1912 and from 1949 it was the Cavendish Grammar School for Girls. Demolished in the 1990s after the co-educational Buxton Community School was built.
	Congregational Church	Hardwick Mount	Designed by Henry Currey and completed in 1861. It was demolished in 1983 and the site was developed for Hardwick Garden apartments.
	Dale Road Mission Church	Dale Road	Anglican chapel opened in 1897 and demolished to make way for St Mary's Church in 1917.
	Devonshire Park Chapel	Devonshire Road and Marborough Road	Methodist chapel designed by Henry Currey and completed in 1873. It was run by Christian Scientists from 1928, after Methodist services stopped in 1918. It was demolished in c.1970.
	Dunmore Square	Market Place	A group of 18th-century buildings in front of the current Town Hall. They were demolished by about 1880.
	Eagle and Child Inn	Market Place	The current four-storey Eagle building was built in 1760, replacing the earlier Eagle and Child Inn which had been on the same site since 1592.
	Empire Hotel	Park Road	Designed by architect Thomas Garner and opened in 1901, it was the largest hotel in Buxton with 300 rooms. It provided luxurious accommodation during the resort season and closed over winter. It was used as a billet for soldiers and an annexe to the Granville Military Hospital in World War I and then as a discharge depot for Canadian soldiers. It was demolished in 1964 and Chatsworth Lodge Apartments were built on the site. The original columns of the entrance gate are still standing on Carlisle Road. Rubble from the demolition of Buxton's Empire Hotel was used to fill in the channel of the railway line in the main tunnel at RAF Harpur Hill.
	Fairfield Church	Fairfield	Built in c.1595 and demolished in 1838.
	Grandstand of Racecourse	Fairfield Common	A racecourse was laid out on the common in the late 1700s. The Duke of Devonshire commissioned the grandstand building. Buxton racecourse closed in 1840 and the grandstand was pulled down. The Buxton and High Peak golf course now occupies the site of the racecourse.
	Grammar School	Market Place	Built in 1840 (central building in photo). Demolished to make way for Eagle Parade, which was built in 1890 to the design of local architect George Garlick.
	Grange Girls School	Park Road	The Grange boarding school for girls was opened in about 1900. It was commandeered in 1940 as a school for Belgian refugee boys in World War II. In 1945 it reverted to being the girls' school for a year. The building was vacant from 1949 until it was demolished in the 1970s and replaced by new houses. The original gate posts are still standing.
	Haddon Hall Hydro	London Road	Built in 1903 as a hydropathic spa hotel with 50 rooms. Later used as a conference and training centre and then as apartments. Demolished in 2011 after a fire destroyed the unoccupied building in 2010. Haddon Hall care home was built on the site.
	High Peak College	Burlow Road	High Peak College was established in 1955. It moved from its original premises (now the location of Buxton Museum) into the old RAF buildings at Harpur Hill in 1964. In 2006 the site closed when the University of Derby moved the college into the Devonshire Dome. The College Hill site (between Burlow Road and Trenchard Road) was developed in 2018 by Persimmon Homes into a residential area.
	Lawson's Wine Vault	Spring Gardens and Terrace Road	Lawson's Corner obstructed the entrance to Spring Gardens and it was demolished in 1876 under the Buxton Local Board Act of 1873. The site is now occupied by the NatWest bank building.
	Lismore Fields	St John's Road	In 1984 the Trent and Peak Archaeological Trust discovered a Stone Age settlement at Lismore Fields. Excavation of the prehistoric site discovered the remains (floors, post holes and pits) of a Mesolithic timber roundhouse and of two Neolithic longhouses. The layout of these buildings could be clearly seen from the positions of the post holes.
	London Road Toll House	London Road	Tollbar for the London turnpike of 1749, at the corner of London Road and Green Lane.
	Market Hall	Market Place	Built in 1857 to a design by Henry Currey but destroyed by fire in 1885. The Town Hall was built on the site in 1899.
	Midland Railway Station	Station Road	Built in 1863 for the Midland Railway alongside the London and North Western Railway (LNWR) station (which is now the Buxton railway station). Both stations were built to the same design by Joseph Paxton. The Midland passenger line to London was closed in 1964 and the station was closed completely in 1967. The Midland Station was demolished in the 1980s to make way for the new ring road.
	Milligan's	Spring Gardens	E.C. Milligan's Drapery and Milliner's shop was founded in 1846. It was demolished in the 1970s. The Argos store was built on the site.
	Orient Lodge	Fairfield	Mansion built in 1896 for Samuel Brittain, a tycoon quarry owner. He was financially ruined following a shipping disaster in the 1920s, after which the estate was sold to the Bingham family. The land was sold to ICI Lime Industry from the 1930s and the house was eventually demolished in the late 1970s. Tunstead Quarry has now expanded across the original estate.
	Oriental Tea Kiosk	Buxton Pavilion Gardens	Designed by William Radford Bryden, built in 1899. Used in the 1960s as an amusement arcade, demolished in 1977.
	Picture House (later Spa Cinema)	Spring Gardens	Built as a cinema in 1916 on the site of the demolished Victoria Arcade and Swedish Gymnasium. In 1937 it was remodelled as the art deco Spa Cinema, running until its closure in the 1960s. It was demolished in about 1986. The Job Centre building and a supermarket now stand on the site.
	Primitive Methodist Chapel	London Road	Opened in 1869 with a Sunday school and minister's house. Dog Leach pond was beside the chapel and undermined its foundations and it was knocked down. The present Primitive Methodist Chapel was built on the same site in 1890.
	Public Hall at Burbage	Leek Road	Opened in July 1894 by Lady Cavendish and Lady Goring. Built opposite Christ Church at the junction of Leek Road and Old Macclesfield Road. The hall held 400 people and was used for all the public events in Burbage for decades. The Burbage war memorial was erected beside it. Later it became Worth's garage and car showroom. At the eastern end of the building were four shops, occupied amongst others by Thomas's Grocers, Bonsall's butchers and Edward's newsagents The building was demolished in 2007.
	RAF camp at Harpur Hill	Morland Way	From December 1939 to December 1960, the No. 28 Maintenance Unit RAF was based at Harpur Hill. RAF Harpur Hill was an underground munitions store. The original wartime RAF camp was a top secret facility and was heavily defended. The camp's housing for staff was built nearby on roads named after past RAF war heroes (such as Nettleton, Tedder and Trenchard). A new site was constructed lower down the hill after the war. Bombs continued to be stored underground during the 1950s. The RAF base was closed in 1961 and most of the camp buildings have since been demolished. The site is now operated by the Health and Safety Executive Laboratory.
	Robin Hood Inn		Heath House on London Road was bought by Marstons Brewery in 1953 and converted into a pub. It changed its name to the Robin Hood in 1969. It was closed in 2014, demolished and replaced by the new Premier Inn hotel, which opened in 2016.
	Roman Baths	The Crescent	Remains of the Roman baths (an ancient smooth stone bath 20m by 7m and a lead cistern on an oak timber frame) were discovered in 1695 at the site of Buxton Old Hall. When the Crescent hotel was built on the site in 1780, a Roman bath was identified and described as "a leaden cistern". The main spring was excavated in the 1970s and a hoard of 232 Roman coins was found, spanning 300 years of the Roman occupation of Britain. Excavations in 2005 revealed the entry passage and doorways to the Roman baths. Between 2009 and 2012 further underground cisterns and a large iron cauldron were revealed.
	Roman Temple	The Slopes	In 1787 Major Hayman Rooke uncovered a long section of the Roman town wall, which is now beneath the landscaped hillside of The Slopes. At the same time Rooke also documented details of the base of a temple in the same area, overlooking the site of the baths and springs. The temple was dedicated to the water deity Arnemetia. It had a shrine room set on a rectangular podium, with a columned portico at the front.
	Shakespeare Hotel	Spring Gardens	Built in 1711 as the Shakespeare Inn. Demolished in 1926 to make way for Woolworths store.
	Sherbrook Lodge	Harpur Hill Road	A grand Victorian building which became the Buxton Youth Hostel. It was closed in 2002 and was subsequently demolished.
	Spa Cinema	Spring Gardens	In 1937 the Picture House cinema on Spring Gardens was remodelled as the art deco Spa Cinema, running until its closure in the 1960s. It was then used as a bingo hall. It was demolished in about 1986. The Job Centre building and a supermarket now stand on the site.
	St Ann's Well (1783)	The Crescent	Architect John Carr designed the 1783 St Ann's Well building to supply drinking water from the thermal spring. It was replaced in 1852 by a simpler arch structure for the drinking well, designed by architect Henry Currey.
	St James Church	Bath Road	Designed by M. H. Taylor and built in 1870–71.The hexagonal tower and spire were removed for safety in 1896. It was closed after congregations shrank and in the 1950s it was demolished. A health clinic is now located on the site.
	Swedish Gymnasium and Victoria Arcade	Spring Gardens	This three-storey Victorian iron and glass building was demolished and replaced by the Picture House cinema in 1916. The Job Centre building and a supermarket now stand on the site.

== See also ==
- Listed buildings in Buxton
- Lost houses of Derbyshire
- Pubs and inns in Buxton
