= St Thomas More Catholic School =

St Thomas More Catholic School may refer to:

- St Thomas More Catholic School, Bay of Plenty, New Zealand
- St Thomas More Catholic School, Bedford, Bedfordshire, England
- St Thomas More Catholic School, Blaydon, Tyne and Wear, England
- St Thomas More Catholic School, Buxton, Derbyshire, England
- St Thomas More Catholic School, Crewe, Cheshire, England
- St Thomas More Catholic School, Eltham, London, England
- St Thomas More Catholic School, Nuneaton, Warwickshire, England
- St Thomas More Catholic School, Willenhall, West Midlands, England
- St Thomas More Catholic School, Wood Green, London, England

== See also ==
- List of institutions named after Thomas More
