= John Buxton Hilton =

British crime writer

John Buxton Hilton (1921–19 June 1986) was a British crime writer. Hilton was born in Buxton, Derbyshire.He became a French teacher and later HMI in French. Ill health led him to early retirement and taking up crime writing in earnest. He wrote the Superintendent Simon Kenworthy series and the Inspector Thomas Brunt series, as well as the Inspector Mosley series under the pseudonym John Greenwood. Hilton died in Norwich.

== Bibliography ==
=== Superintendent Simon Kenworthy series ===
- Death of an Alderman (1968) (apa Dead Man's Path)
- Death in Midwinter (1969)
- Hangman's Tide (1975)
- No Birds Sang (1975) (apa Target of Suspicion)
- Some Run Crooked (1978)
- The Anathema Stone (1980) (apa Fatal Curtain)
- Playground of Death (1981)
- Surrender Value (1981) (apa Twice Dead)
- The Green Frontier (1982) (apa Focus on Crime)
- The Sunset Law (1982)
- The Asking Price (1983) (apa Ransom Game)
- Corridors of Guilt (1984)
- The Hobbema Prospect (1984) (apa Cradle of Crims)
- Passion in the Peak (1985) (apa Holiday for Murder)
- Moondrop to Murder (1986)
- The Innocents at Home (1986) (apa Lesson in Murder)
- Displaced Persons (1987)

=== Inspector Thomas Brunt series ===
- Rescue from the Rose (1976)
- Gamekeeper's Gallows (1976)
- Dead-Nettle (1977)
- Mr. Fred (1983)
- The Quiet Stranger (1985)
- Slickensides (1987)

=== Inspector Mosley series ===
- Murder, Mr. Mosley (1983) (as John Greenwood)
- Mosley by Moonlight (1984) (as John Greenwood)
- Mosley Went to Mow (1985) (as John Greenwood) (apa The Missing Mr. Mosley)
- Mists Over Mosley (1986) (as John Greenwood)
- The Mind of Mr. Mosley (1987) (as John Greenwood)
- What Me, Mr. Mosley? (1988) (as John Greenwood)
