= Buxton =

Town in Derbyshire, England

Coordinates: 53°15′32″N 1°54′40″W

- Town
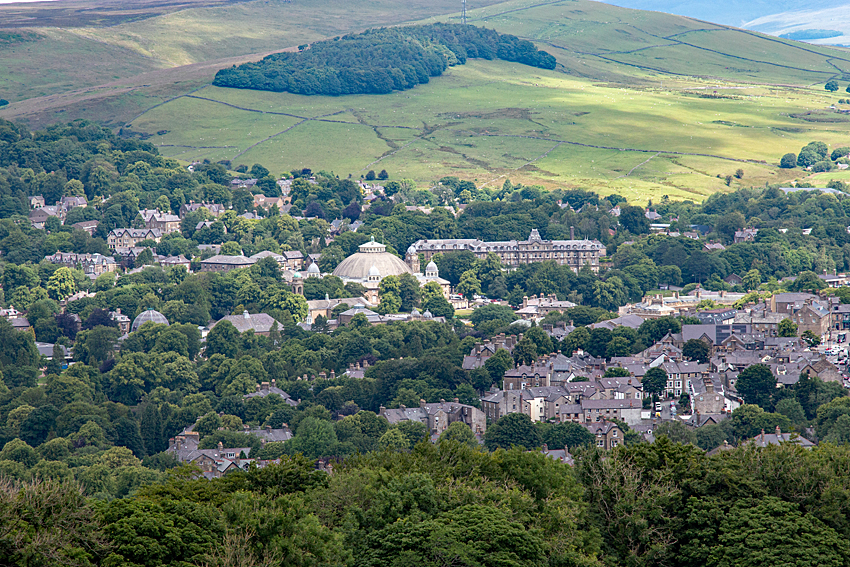
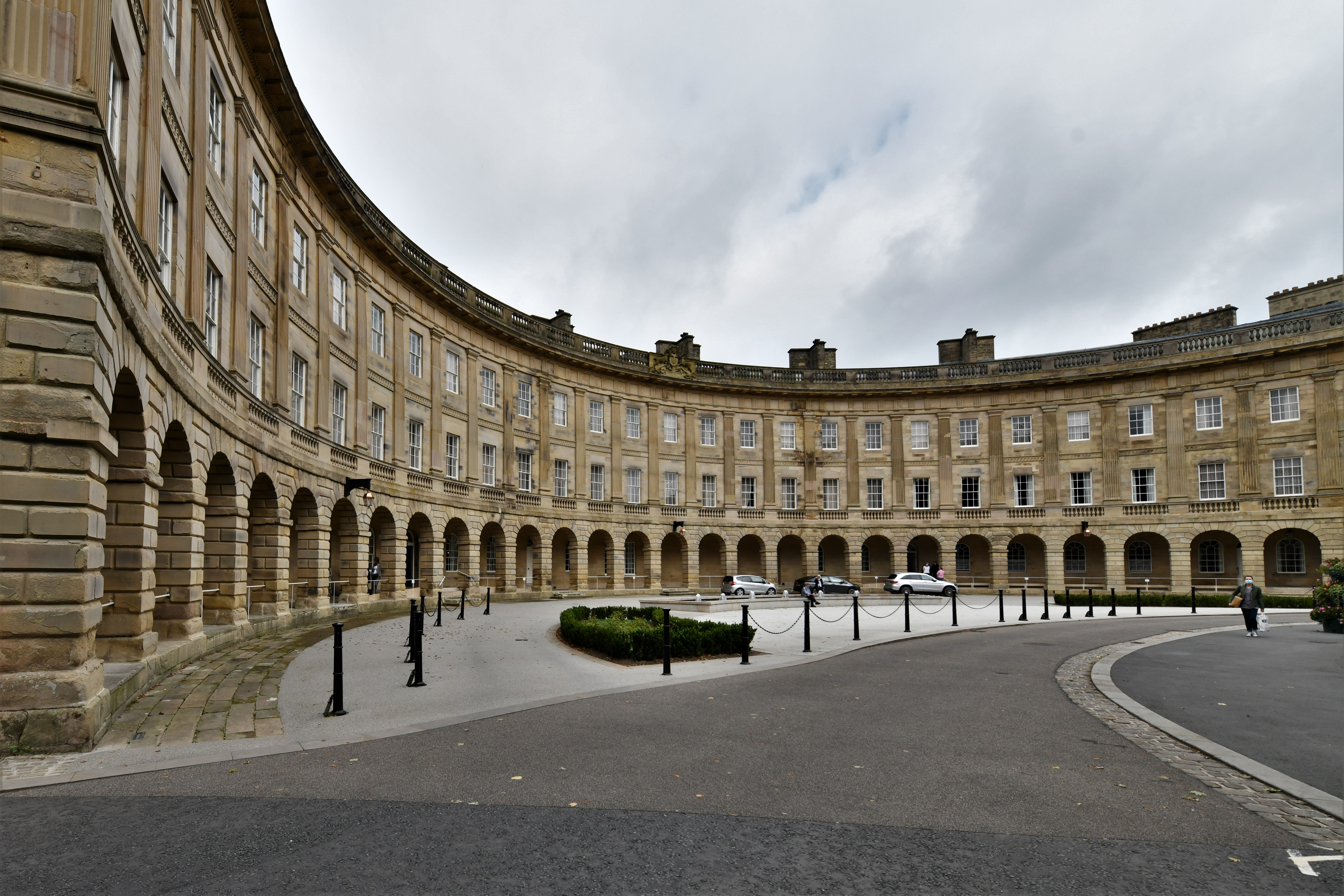
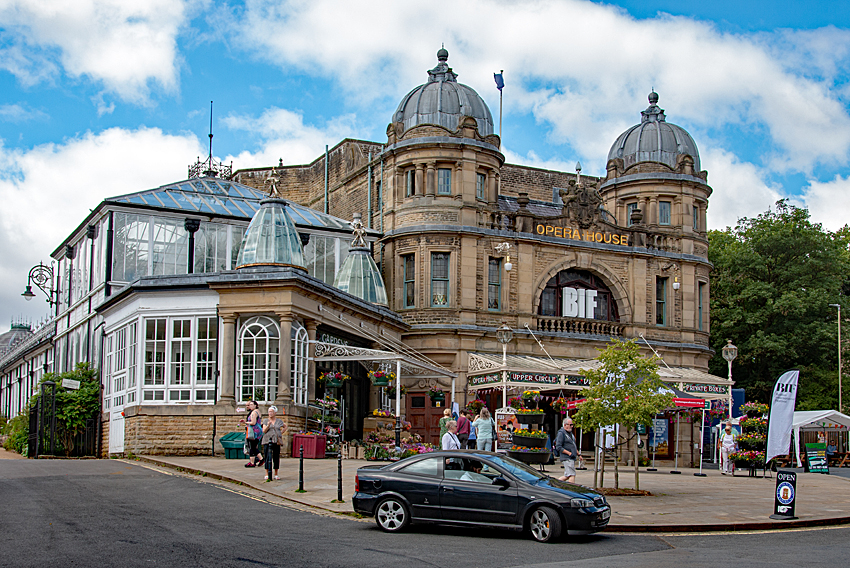
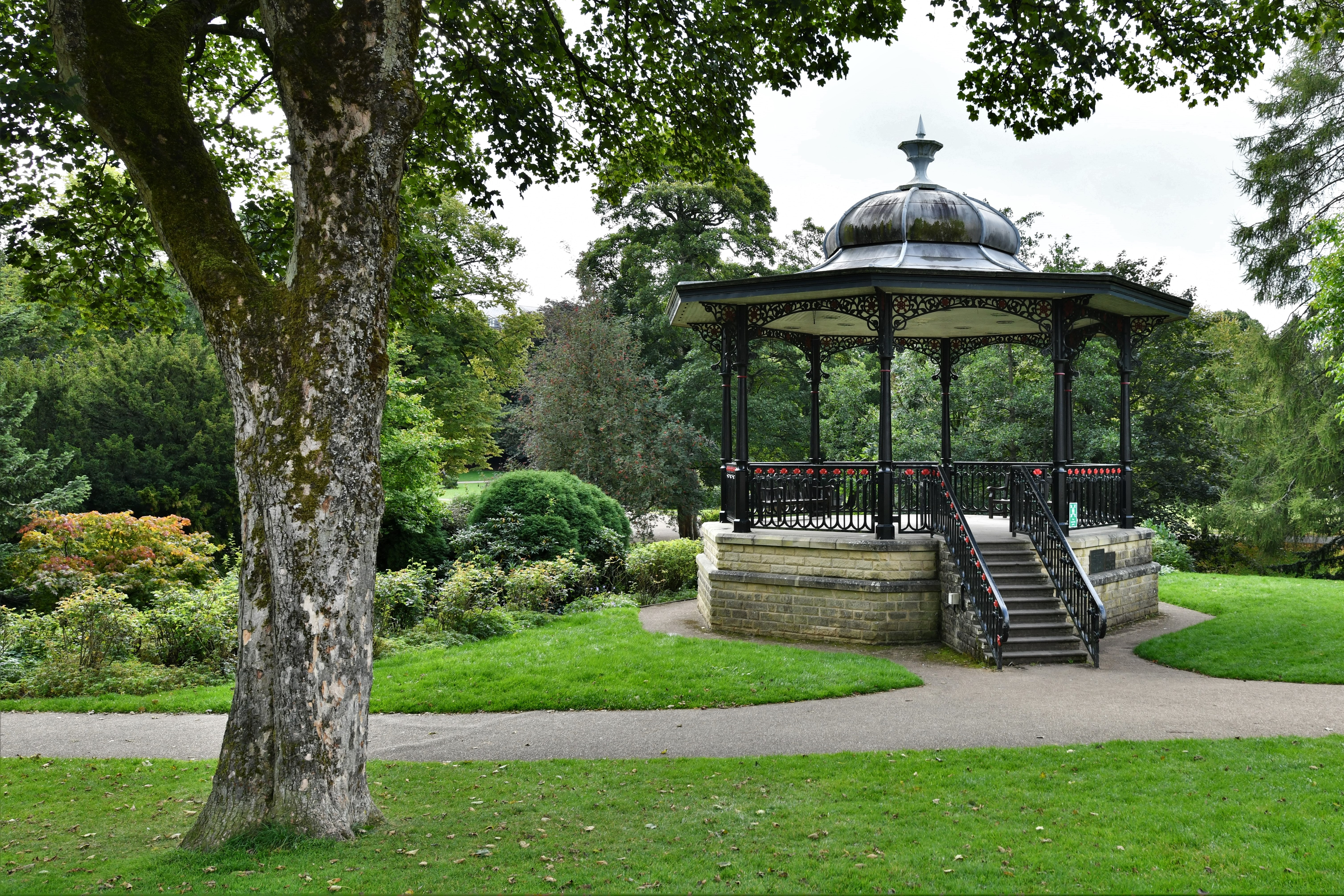
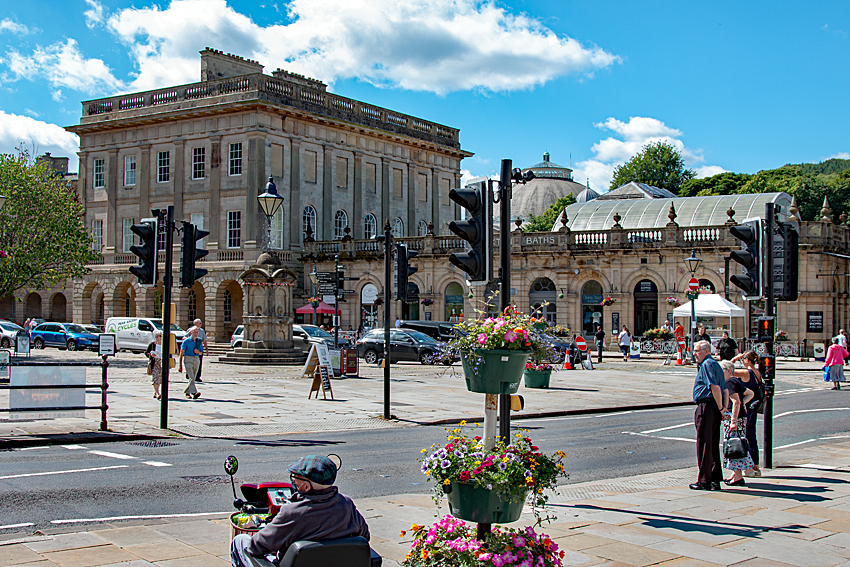
- Buxton from Grin Low Buxton Crescent Opera House Pavilion Gardens Buxton Baths

- Location within Derbyshire
- Population: 20,048 (2021)
- OS grid reference: SK059735
- District: High Peak
- Shire county: Derbyshire
- Region: East Midlands
- Country: England
- Sovereign state: United Kingdom
- Post town: BUXTON
- Postcode district: SK17
- Dialling code: 01298
- Police: Derbyshire
- Fire: Derbyshire
- Ambulance: East Midlands
- UK Parliament: High Peak

Buxton is a spa town in the borough of High Peak, Derbyshire, in the East Midlands region of England. It is England's highest market town, sited at some 1,000 feet (300 m) above sea level. (Note: Alston, Cumbria also claims this, but lacks a regular market.) It lies close to Cheshire to the west and Staffordshire to the south, on the edge of the Peak District National Park. In 1974, the municipal borough merged with other nearby boroughs, including Glossop, to form the local government district and borough of High Peak.

The town population was 20,048 at the 2021 Census (down from 21,108 at the 2011 Census). Sights include Poole's Cavern, a limestone cavern; St Ann's Well, fed by a geothermal spring bottled by Buxton Natural Mineral Water (owned by Nestle); and many historic buildings, including John Carr's restored Buxton Crescent, Henry Currey's Buxton Baths and Frank Matcham's Buxton Opera House. The Devonshire Campus of the University of Derby occupies historic premises. Buxton is twinned with Oignies in France and Bad Nauheim in Germany.

== History ==
The origins of the name are unclear. It may derive from the Old English for Buck Stone or for Rocking Stone. The town grew in importance in the late 18th century, when it was developed by the Dukes of Devonshire, with a resurgence a century later as Victorians were drawn to the reputed healing properties of its waters.

=== Stone Age beginnings ===
The first inhabitants of Buxton made homes at Lismore Fields some 6,000 years ago. This Stone Age settlement, a scheduled monument, was rediscovered in 1984, with remains of a Mesolithic timber roundhouse and Neolithic longhouses.

=== Roman settlement ===
The Romans developed a settlement known as Aquae Arnemetiae ("Baths of the grove goddess"). Coins found show the Romans were in Buxton throughout their occupation of Britain.

Batham Gate ("road to the bath town") is a Roman road from Templebrough Roman fort in South Yorkshire to Navio Roman Fort and on to Buxton.

=== Middle Ages ===
The name Buckestones was first recorded in the 12th century as part of the Peverel family's estate. From 1153 the town was within the Duchy of Lancaster's Crown estate, close to the Royal Forest of the Peak on the Fairfield side of the River Wye. Monastic farms were set up in Fairfield in the 13th century and in the 14th; its royal ownership was reflected in the name of Kyngesbucstones.

By 1460, Buxton's spring had been pronounced a holy one dedicated to St Anne, who was canonised in 1382. A chapel had appeared there by 1498.

=== Spa town boom ===
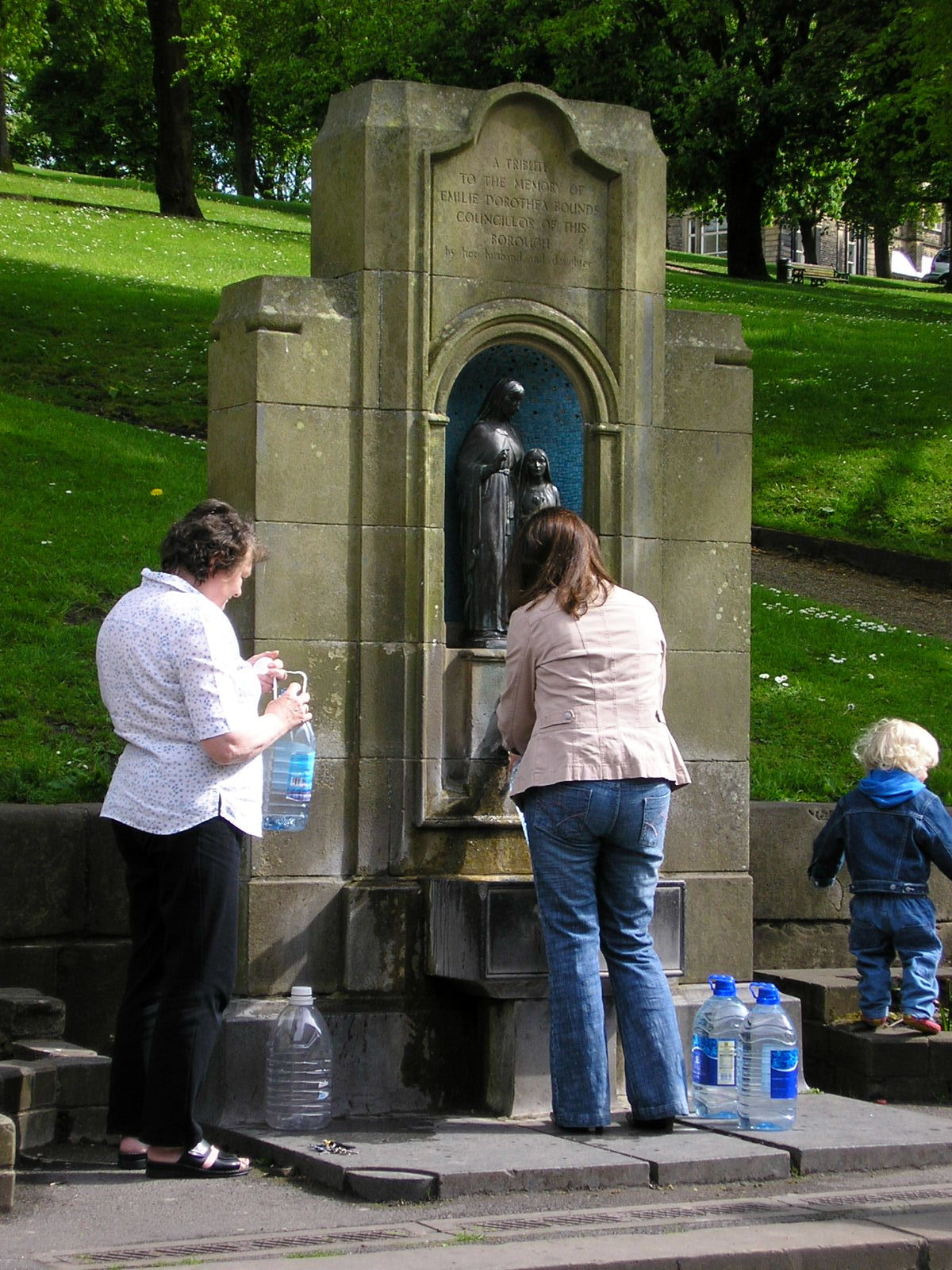
People filling bottles with water at St Ann's Well

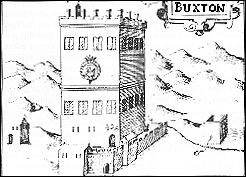
Buxton Wells, from a 1610 map

Built on the River Wye, and overlooked by Axe Edge Moor, Buxton became a spa town for its geothermal spring, which gushes at a steady 28 °C.

The spring waters are piped to St Ann's Well, a shrine since medieval times at the foot of The Slopes, opposite the Crescent and near the town centre. The well was called one of the Seven Wonders of the Peak by the philosopher Thomas Hobbes in his 1636 book De Mirabilibus Pecci: Being The Wonders of the Peak in Darby-shire.

The Dukes of Devonshire became involved in 1780, when William Cavendish, 5th Duke of Devonshire used profits from his copper mines to develop it as a spa in the style of Bath. Their ancestor Bess of Hardwick had brought one of her four husbands, the Earl of Shrewsbury, to "take the waters" at Buxton in 1569, shortly after he became the gaoler of Mary, Queen of Scots, and took Mary there in 1573. She called Buxton "La Fontagne de Bogsby". She stayed at the site of the Old Hall Hotel, where the Earl of Shrewsbury had built a lodging for visitors. According to John Jones of Derby, author of Buxtone's Bathes Benefyte (1572), the visitors to Shrewsbury's "goodly house" enjoyed a game of table bowls known as trou madame.

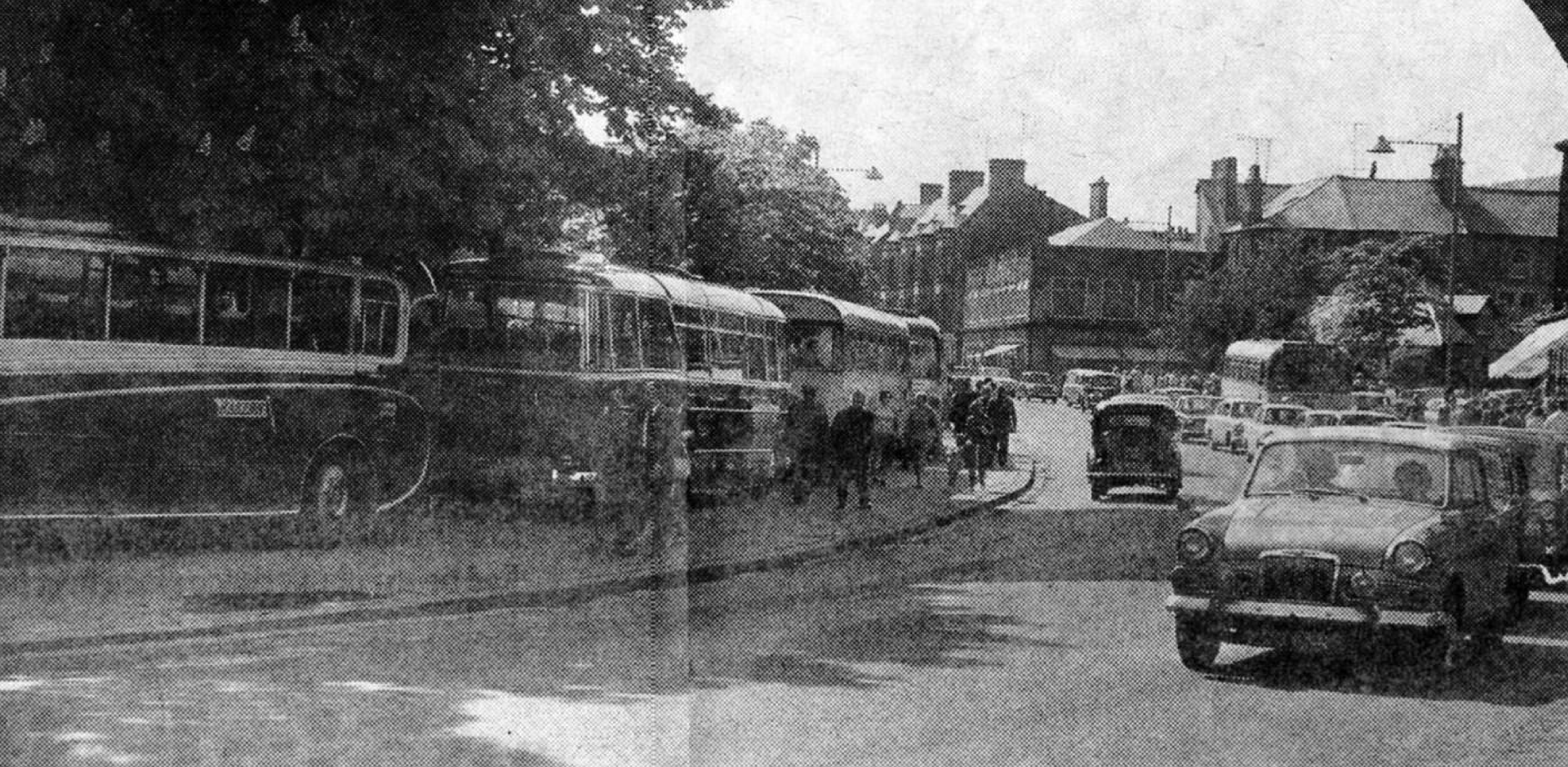
Buxton in 1965 with shoppers and tourists filling Spring Gardens

The area features in the works of W. H. Auden, Jane Austen and Emily Brontë. Buxton's profile was boosted by a recommendation from Erasmus Darwin of the waters there and at Matlock, addressed to Josiah Wedgwood I. The Wedgwood family often visited Buxton and commended the area to their friends. Two of Charles Darwin's half-cousins, Edward Levett Darwin and Reginald Darwin, settled there. The arrival of the railway in 1863 stimulated growth: the population of 1,800 in 1861 exceeded 6,000 by 1881.

=== 20th century ===
Buxton held a base for British and Canadian troops in the First World War. Granville Military Hospital was set up at the Buxton Hydropathic Hotel, with the Palace Hotel annexed. The author Vera Brittain trained as a Voluntary Aid Detachment nurse at the Devonshire Hospital in 1915. The Royal Engineers based in Buxton used the Pavilion Gardens' lakes for training to build pontoon bridges. Prisoner of war camps at Ladmanlow and Peak Dale were established in 1917 to supply workers for the local limestone quarries.

RAF Harpur Hill became an underground bomb-storage facility during World War II and the country's largest munitions dump. It was also the base for the Peak District section of the RAF Mountain Rescue Service. Prisoner of war camps for Italians and Germans were set up on Lismore Road, off Macclesfield Road and at Dove Holes.

After a decline as a spa resort in the earlier 20th century, Buxton had a resurgence in the 1950s and 1970s. The Playhouse Theatre kept a repertory company and pop concerts were held at the Octagon (including the Beatles in 1963). The Opera House re-opened in 1979 with the launch of the Buxton Festival, and the town was being used as a base for exploring the Peak District.

=== 21st century ===
After the 2022 Russian invasion of Ukraine, Buxton received 150 refugees. In 2024 it was announced that Buxton town centre would have a £100m regeneration project.

== Governance ==
Buxton is part of the High Peak constituency for elections to the House of Commons of the United Kingdom. Since 2024, the local Member of Parliament (MP) has been Jon Pearce from the Labour Party.

Since the 2025 Derbyshire County Council election, Buxton is represented by Conservative and Reform UK county councillors on Derbyshire County Council.

== Geography and geology ==
Although outside the National Park boundary, Buxton is in the western part of the Peak District, between the Lower Carboniferous limestone of the White Peak to the east and the Upper Carboniferous shale, sandstone and gritstone of the Dark Peak to the west. The early settlement (of which only the parish church of St Anne, built in 1625, remains) was largely made of limestone, while the present buildings of locally quarried sandstone, mostly date from the late 18th century.

At the south edge of the town, the River Wye has carved an extensive limestone cavern known as Poole's Cavern. More than 330 yards (300 metres) of its chambers are open to the public. It contains Derbyshire's largest stalactite and some unique "poached egg" stalagmites. Its name recalls a local highwayman.

=== Climate ===
Buxton has an oceanic climate with short, mild summers and long, cool winters. At about 1,000 feet (300 m) above sea level, Buxton is the highest market town in England. Buxton's elevation makes it cooler and wetter than surrounding towns, with a daytime temperature typically about 2 °C lower than Manchester.

A Met Office weather station has collected climate data for the town since 1867, with digitised data from 1959 available online. In June 1975, the town suffered a freak snowstorm that stopped play during a cricket match.

Climate data for Buxton, elevation: 299 m (981 ft), 1991–2020 normals, extremes 1874–present
| Month | Jan | Feb | Mar | Apr | May | Jun | Jul | Aug | Sep | Oct | Nov | Dec | Year |
|---|---|---|---|---|---|---|---|---|---|---|---|---|---|
| Record high °C (°F) | 13.0 (55.4) | 15.3 (59.5) | 21.6 (70.9) | 23.9 (75.0) | 29.9 (85.8) | 29.6 (85.3) | 35.9 (96.6) | 32.7 (90.9) | 25.9 (78.6) | 25.0 (77.0) | 16.7 (62.1) | 13.7 (56.7) | 35.9 (96.6) |
| Mean daily maximum °C (°F) | 5.5 (41.9) | 5.9 (42.6) | 8.2 (46.8) | 11.2 (52.2) | 14.5 (58.1) | 17.2 (63.0) | 19.1 (66.4) | 18.7 (65.7) | 15.9 (60.6) | 11.8 (53.2) | 8.2 (46.8) | 5.9 (42.6) | 11.8 (53.3) |
| Daily mean °C (°F) | 3.2 (37.8) | 3.3 (37.9) | 5.0 (41.0) | 7.4 (45.3) | 10.3 (50.5) | 13.2 (55.8) | 15.1 (59.2) | 14.8 (58.6) | 12.4 (54.3) | 9.0 (48.2) | 5.8 (42.4) | 3.6 (38.5) | 8.6 (47.5) |
| Mean daily minimum °C (°F) | 0.9 (33.6) | 0.7 (33.3) | 1.8 (35.2) | 3.5 (38.3) | 6.1 (43.0) | 9.1 (48.4) | 11.1 (52.0) | 10.9 (51.6) | 8.8 (47.8) | 6.1 (43.0) | 3.4 (38.1) | 1.2 (34.2) | 5.3 (41.5) |
| Record low °C (°F) | −17.2 (1.0) | −15.0 (5.0) | −16.7 (1.9) | −8.0 (17.6) | −4.4 (24.1) | −0.4 (31.3) | −0.6 (30.9) | 0.6 (33.1) | −1.7 (28.9) | −6.6 (20.1) | −9.3 (15.3) | −14.0 (6.8) | −17.2 (1.0) |
| Average precipitation mm (inches) | 127.4 (5.02) | 116.1 (4.57) | 100.0 (3.94) | 86.5 (3.41) | 82.0 (3.23) | 92.6 (3.65) | 100.8 (3.97) | 101.5 (4.00) | 105.7 (4.16) | 141.8 (5.58) | 136.3 (5.37) | 153.3 (6.04) | 1,344 (52.94) |
| Average precipitation days (≥ 1.0 mm) | 16.5 | 15.0 | 13.4 | 12.2 | 11.6 | 12.7 | 13.2 | 14.1 | 13.1 | 15.8 | 17.2 | 17.4 | 172.2 |
| Mean monthly sunshine hours | 41.1 | 67.6 | 104.5 | 151.3 | 185.2 | 170.8 | 182.9 | 169.3 | 126.8 | 90.3 | 52.4 | 40.3 | 1,382.5 |
Source 1: Met Office
Source 2: KNMI Meteo Climat

== Notable architecture ==
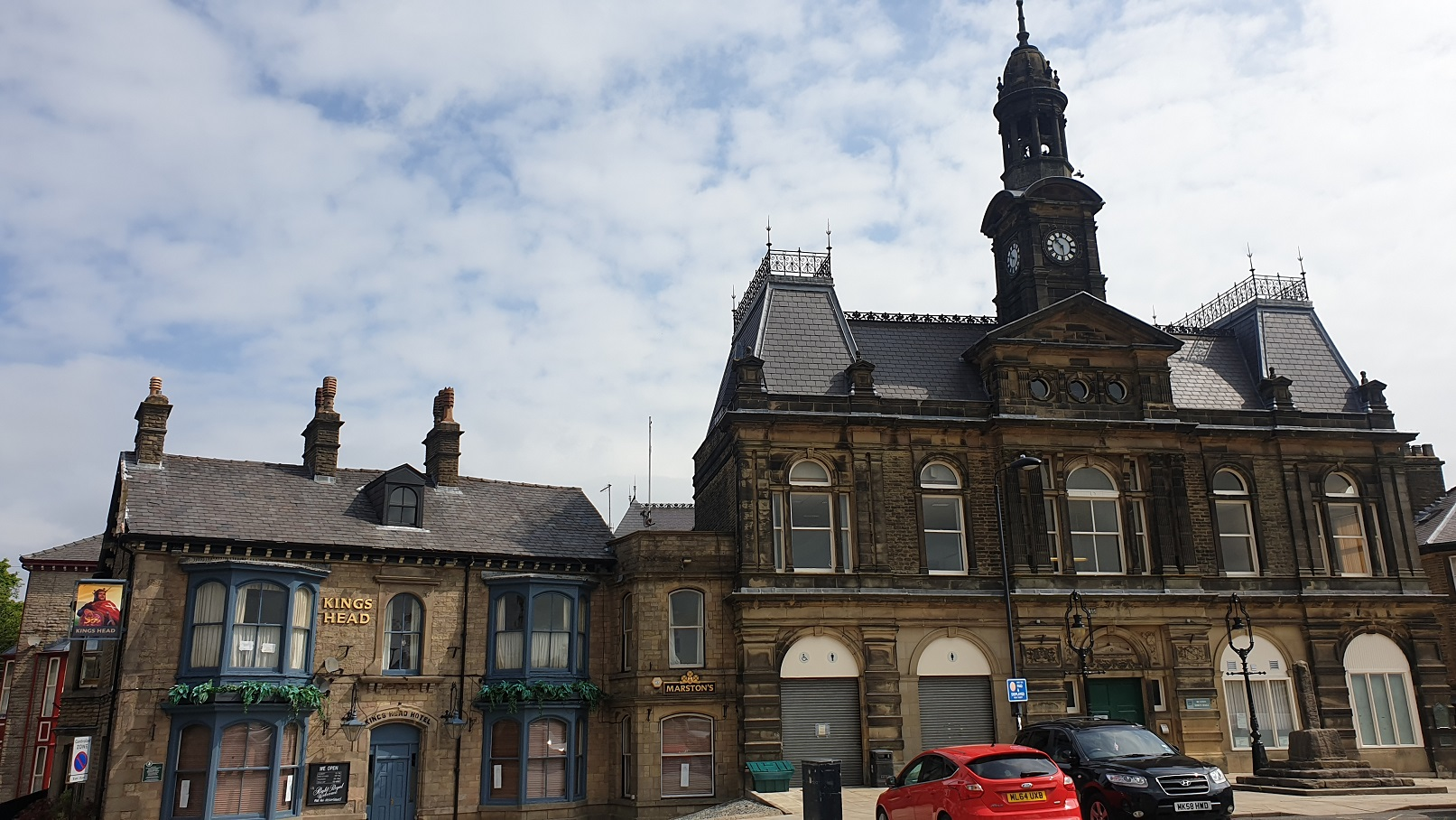
Buxton Town Hall (on the right)

The many visitors to Buxton for its thermal waters, particularly in the 18th and 19th centuries, led to several new buildings to provide hospitality facilities.

The Old Hall Hotel is one of the town's oldest buildings. It was owned by George Talbot, 6th Earl of Shrewsbury, who with his wife, Bess of Hardwick, acted as the "gaolers" of Mary, Queen of Scots, who came to Buxton several times to take the waters, her final visit being in 1584. The present building dates from 1670, and has a five-bay front with a Tuscan doorway.

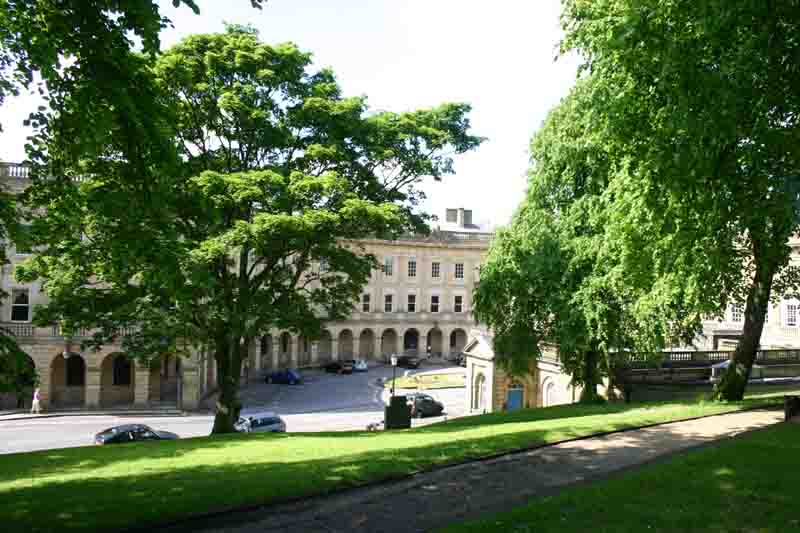
Buxton Crescent and St Ann's Well

The Grade I listed Crescent was built in 1780–1784 for the 5th Duke of Devonshire, as part of his effort to turn Buxton into a fashionable spa town. Modelled on Bath's Royal Crescent, it was designed by architect John Carr, together with the neighbouring irregular octagon and colonnade of the Great Stables. These were completed in 1789, but in 1859 were largely converted to a charity hospital for the "sick poor" by Henry Currey, architect to the 7th Duke of Devonshire. Currey had previously worked on St Thomas' Hospital in London. It became known as the Devonshire Royal Hospital in 1934. Later phases of conversion after 1881 were by local architect Robert Rippon Duke, including his design for the Devonshire Dome as the world's largest unsupported dome, with a diameter of 144 feet (44 m) – larger than the Pantheon at 141 feet (43 m), St. Peter's Basilica at 138 feet (42 m) in Rome, and St Paul's Cathedral at 112 feet (34 m). The record was surpassed only by space frame domes such as the Georgia Dome (840 feet (260 m)). The building and its surrounding Victorian villas are now part of the University of Derby.

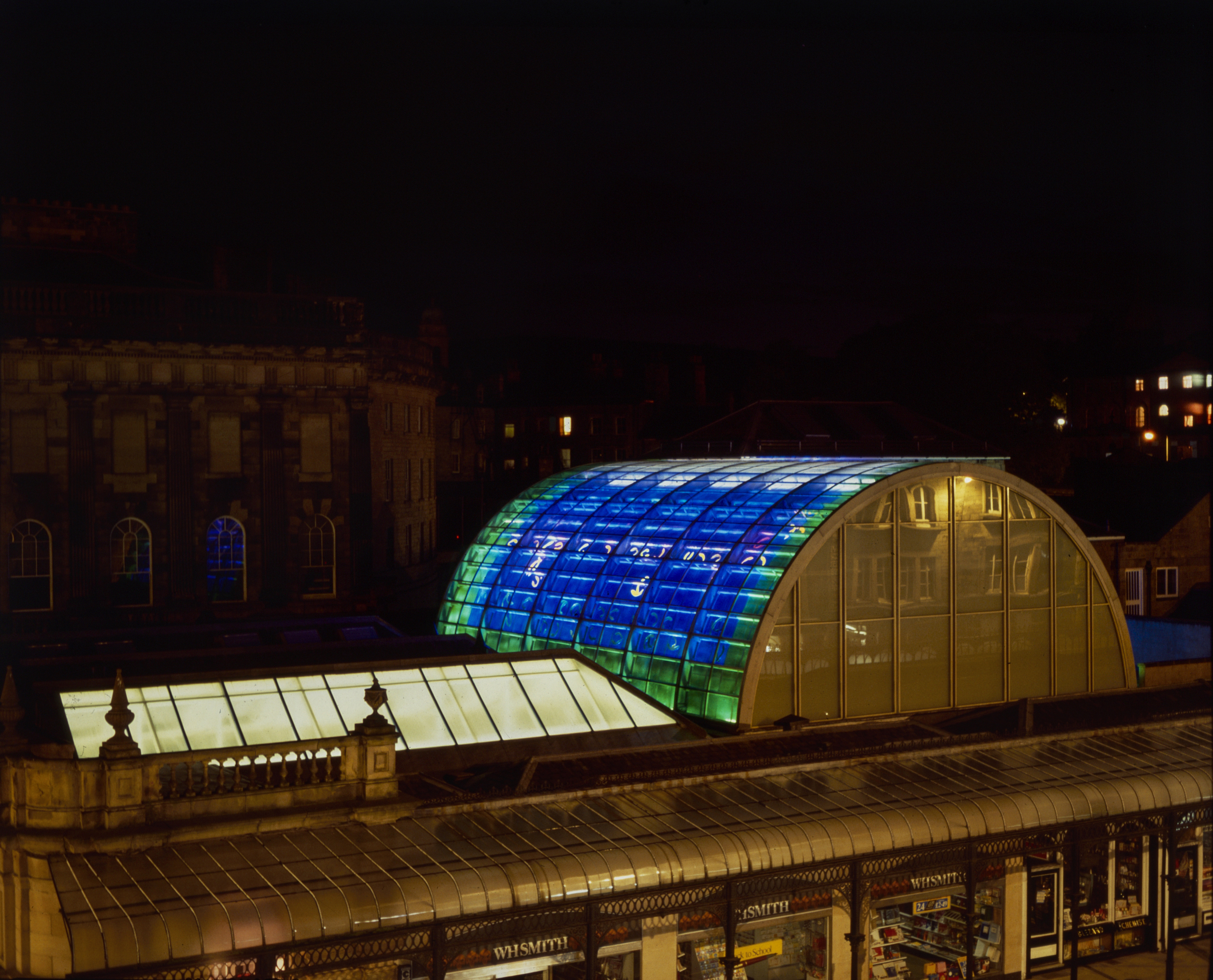
Nocturnal view of the restored Buxton Thermal Baths, and Brian Clarke's modern stained glass canopy over the Cavendish Arcade

Currey also designed the Grade II listed Buxton Baths, comprising the Natural Mineral Baths to the west of The Crescent and Buxton Thermal Baths to the east, which opened in 1854 on the site of the original Roman baths, together with the 1894 Pump Room opposite. The Thermal Baths, closed in 1963 and at risk of demolition, were restored and converted into a shopping arcade by conservation architects Derek Latham and Company. Architectural artist Brian Clarke contributed to the refurbishment; his scheme, designed in 1984 and completed in 1987, was for a landmark modern artwork, a barrel-vaulted modern stained glass ceiling to enclose the former baths — at the time the largest stained glass window in the British Isles — creating an atrial space for what became the Cavendish Arcade. Visitors could "take the waters" at The Pump Room until 1981. Between 1981 and 1995 the building housed the Buxton Micrarium Exhibition, an interactive display with 50 remote-controlled microscopes. The building was refurbished as part of the National Lottery-funded Buxton Crescent and Thermal Spa re-development. Beside it, added in 1940, is St Ann's Well. In October 2020 Ensana reopened the Crescent as a 5-star spa hotel, after a 17-year refurbishment.

Nearby stands the imposing monument to Samuel Turner (1805–1878), treasurer of the Devonshire Hospital and Buxton Bath Charity, built in 1879 and accidentally lost for the latter part of the 20th century during construction work, before being found and restored in 1994.

When the railways arrived in Buxton in 1863, Buxton railway station had been designed by Joseph Paxton, previously gardener and architect to William Cavendish, 6th Duke of Devonshire. Paxton also contributed the layout of the Park Road circular estate. He is perhaps known best for his design of the Crystal Palace in London. Buxton Town Hall, designed by William Pollard, was completed in 1889.

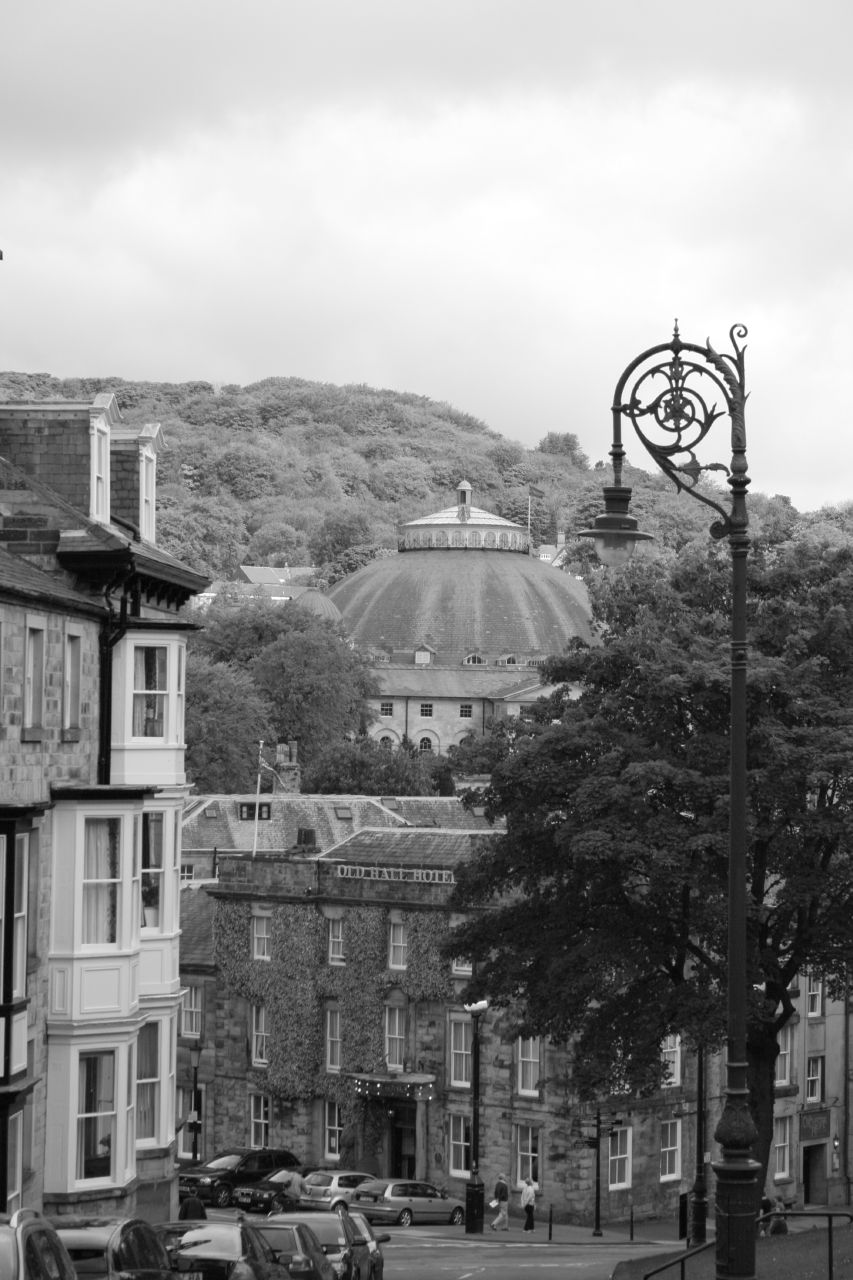
Corbar Hill and the Dome

=== Other architecture ===
Buxton Opera House, designed by Frank Matcham in 1903, is the highest opera-house site in the country. Matcham, a theatre architect, was responsible for several London theatres, including the London Palladium, the London Coliseum and the Hackney Empire. Opposite is an original Penfold octagonal post box. The opera house is attached to the Pavilion Gardens, Octagonal Hall (built in 1875) and the smaller Pavilion Arts Centre (previously The Hippodrome and the Playhouse Theatre.). Buxton Pavilion Gardens, designed by Edward Milner, contain 93,000 m^{2} of gardens and ponds and were opened in 1871. These form a Grade II* listed public park of Special Historic Interest. Milner's design was a development of Joseph Paxton's landscape for the Serpentine Walks in the 1830s.

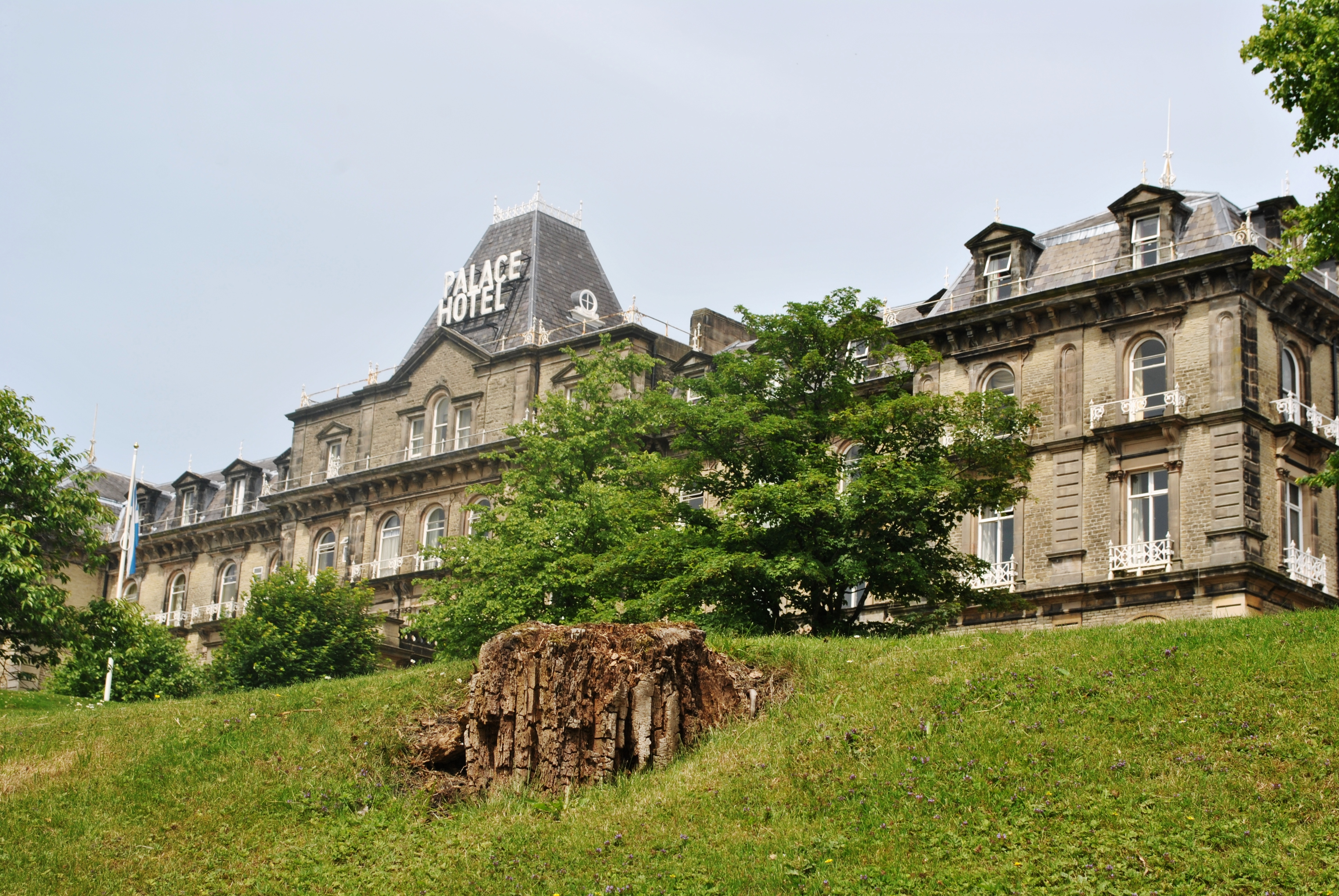
Palace Hotel

The 122-room Palace Hotel, also designed by Currey and built in 1868, is a prominent feature of the Buxton skyline on the hill above the railway station.

Corbar Cross (Note: This is a photo of the cross before it was cut down in 2010. It has since been restored.)

The town is overlooked by Grin Low hill, 1,441 feet (439 m) above sea level, and by Grinlow Tower (locally also called Solomon's Temple), a two-storey granite, crooked, crenelated folly built in 1834 by Solomon Mycock to provide work for local unemployed, and restored in 1996 after lengthy closure. In the other direction, on Corbar Hill, 1,433 feet (437 m) above sea level, is the tall wooden Corbar Cross. Originally given to the Catholic Church by the Duke of Devonshire in 1950 to mark Holy Year, it was replaced in the 1980s. In 2010, during a visit of Pope Benedict XVI to the UK, it was cut down as a protest against a long history of child abuse at the Catholic St Williams School in Market Weighton, Yorkshire. The Buxton ecumenical group Churches Together brought in several benefactors to replace the cross with a smaller one in May 2011.

Many pubs and inns in Buxton are listed buildings reflecting the historic character of the town, although many buildings have been demolished. Lost buildings of Buxton include grand spa hotels, the Midland Railway station, the Picture House cinema and Cavendish Girls' Grammar School.

== Culture ==
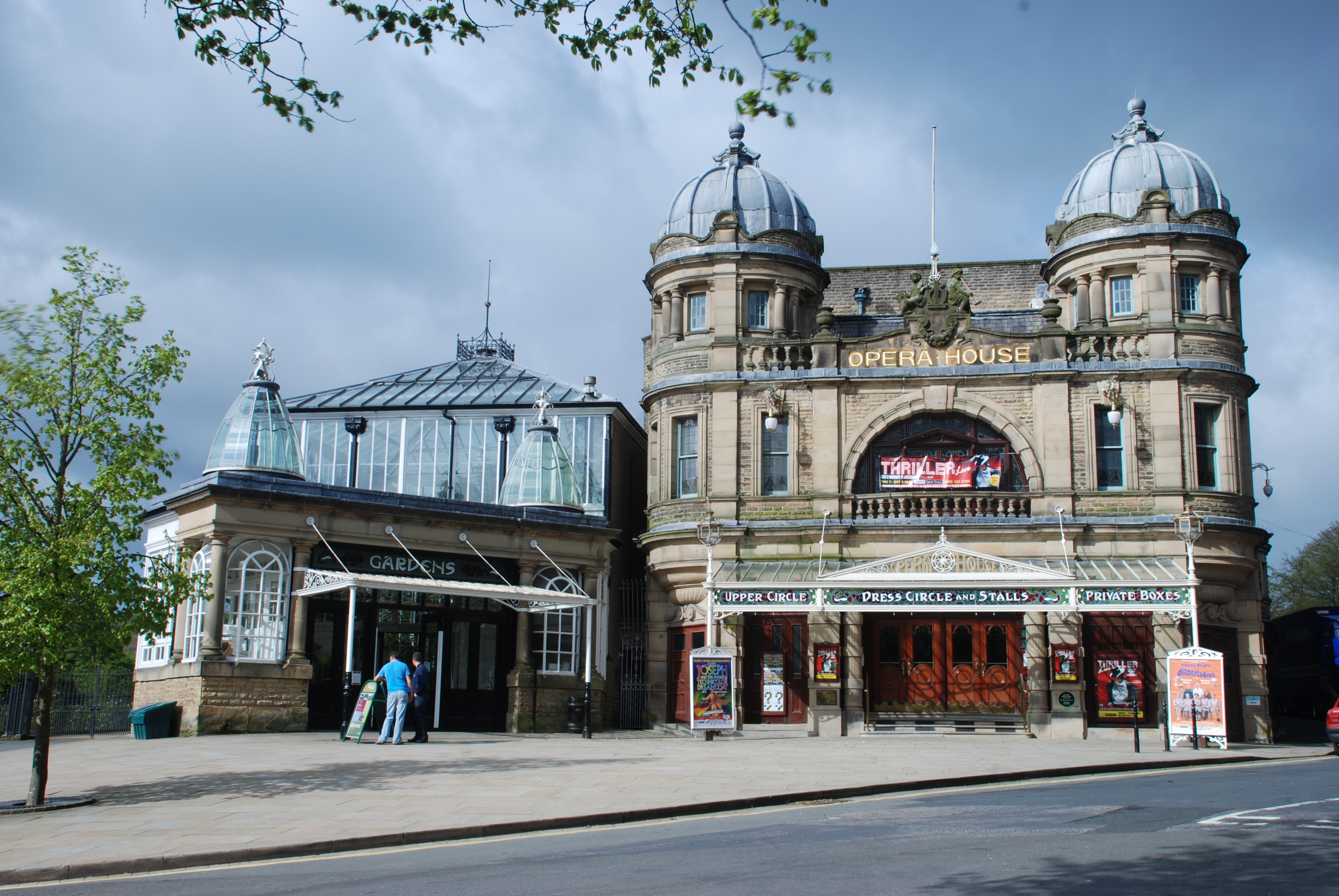
Buxton Opera House

Cultural events include the annual Buxton Festival, festivals and performances at the Buxton Opera House, and shows running at other venues alongside them. Buxton Museum and Art Gallery offers year-round exhibitions.

=== Buxton Festival ===
Buxton Festival, founded in 1979, is an opera and arts event held in July at the Opera House and other venues. It includes some literary events in the mornings, concerts and recitals in the afternoon, and operas, many rarely performed, in the evenings. The quality of the opera programme has improved in recent years, after decades when, according to critic Rupert Christiansen, the festival featured "work of such mediocre quality that I just longed for someone to put it out of its misery." Running alongside is the Buxton Festival Fringe, known as a warm-up for the Edinburgh Fringe. The Buxton Fringe features drama, music, dance, comedy, poetry, art exhibitions and films around the town. In 2018, 181 entrants signed up and comedy and theatre categories were at their largest.

=== Other festivals ===
The week-long Four Four Time music festival in February brings a variety of rock, pop, folk, blues, jazz and world music. The International Gilbert and Sullivan Festival, a three-week theatre event from the end of July through the first half of August, was held in Buxton from 1994 to 2013; it moved to Harrogate in 2014 but returned to Buxton in 2023.

The Opera House offers a year-long programme of drama, concerts, comedy and other events. In September 2010, the Paxton Suite in the Pavilion Gardens reopened as the Pavilion Arts Centre after a £2.5 million reconstruction. Located behind the Opera House, it includes a 369-seat auditorium. The stage area can be converted into a separate 93-seat studio theatre.

Buxton Museum and Art Gallery holds local artefacts, geological and archaeological samples (including the William Boyd Dawkins collection) and 19th and 20th-century paintings, with work by Brangwyn, Chagall, Chahine and their contemporaries. There are also displays by local and regional artists and other events. The Pavilion Gardens hold regular arts, crafts, antiques and jewellery fairs.

Buxton's Well Dressing Festival in the week up to the second Saturday in July has been running in its current form since 1840, to mark the provision of fresh water to the high point of the town's marketplace. As well as the dressing of the wells, it includes a carnival procession and a funfair on the marketplace. Well dressing is an ancient custom unique to the Peak District and Derbyshire and thought to date back to Roman and Celtic times, when communities would dress wells to give thanks for supplies of fresh water.

== Economy ==
Buxton's economy covers tourism, retail, quarrying, scientific research, light industry and mineral water bottling. The University of Derby is a noted employer. Surrounded by the Peak District National Park, it offers a range of cultural events; tourism is a major industry, with over a million visitors to Buxton each year. Buxton is the main centre for overnight accommodation in the Peak District, with over 64 per cent of the park's visitor bed space.

The Buxton Mineral Water Company, owned by Nestlé, extracts and bottles mineral waters. The Buxton Advertiser appears weekly. Potters of Buxton is the town's oldest department store, founded in 1860.

=== Quarrying ===
The Buxton lime industry has shaped the town's development and landscape since its 17th-century beginnings. Buxton Lime Firms (BLF) was formed by 13 quarry owners in 1891. BLF became part of Imperial Chemical Industries (ICI) in 1926 and Buxton was the headquarters for I.C.I. Lime Division until the 1970s. Several limestone quarries lie close, including the "Tunstead Superquarry", the largest producer of high-purity industrial limestone in Europe, employing 400. The quarrying sector also provides jobs in limestone processing and distribution. Other industrial employers include the Health & Safety Laboratory, which engages in health and safety research and incident investigations and maintains over 350 staff locally.

== Education ==
The town hosts a University of Derby campus at the site of the former Devonshire Royal Hospital, as well as the Buxton & Leek College formed by the August 2012 merger of the university with Leek College.

Secondary schools include Buxton Community School, at the former College Road site of Buxton College, and St. Thomas More Catholic School. Others include Buxton Junior School, St Anne's Catholic Primary, Harper Hill School, Buxton Infant School, John Duncan School, Fairfield Infant & Nursery, Burbage Primary, Dove Holes CE Primary, Fairfield Endowed Junior, Peak Dale Primary, Leek College, Old Sams Farm Independent School, Hollinsclough CE Primary, Flash CE Primary, Earl Sterndale CE Primary, Peak Forest CE Primary and Combs Infant School.

== Sport and civic organisations ==
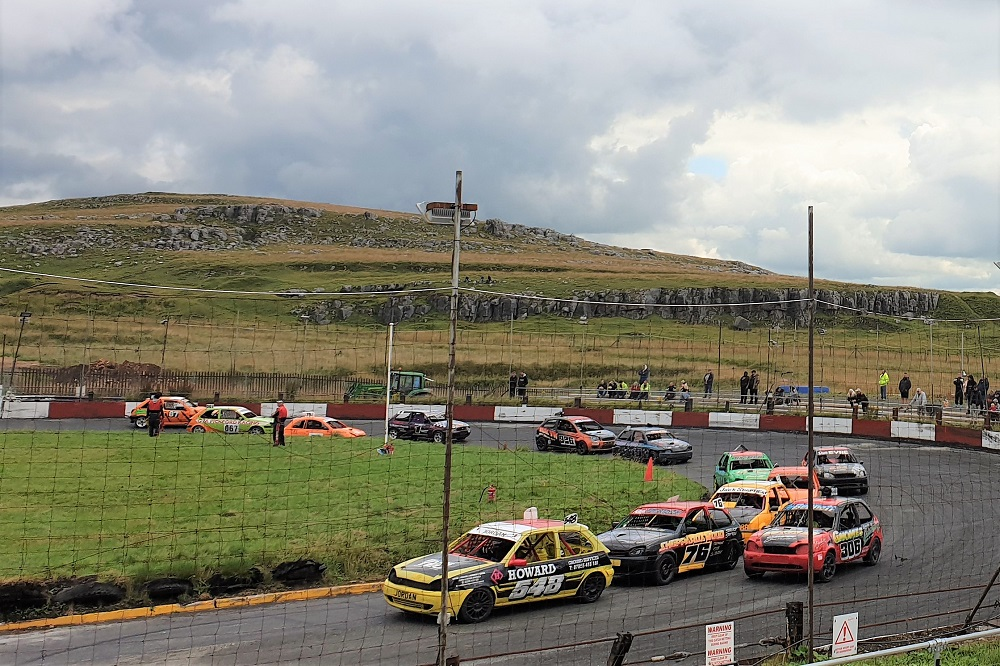
Buxton Raceway

Above the town are two race tracks, a speedway & stock car stadium. Buxton Raceway (formerly High Edge Raceway), off the A53 Buxton to Leek road, is a motor sports circuit set up in 1974, hosting banger and stock car racing, as well as drifting events. It was home to the speedway team Buxton High Edge Hitmen in the mid-1990s before the team moved to a custom-built track to the north of the original one. The original track at High Edge Raceway was among the longest and trickiest in the UK. The new track is more conventional, and has been improved a few times. Buxton have been competitors in the Conference League. Buxton Raceway held the floodlit 2019 BriSCA Formula 2 World Final.

Buxton's football club, Buxton F.C., plays at Silverlands and Buxton Cricket Club at the Park Road ground. Other team clubs are Buxton Rugby Union and Buxton Hockey Club. There are also four Hope Valley League football clubs: Buxton Town, Peak Dale and Buxton Christians play at the Fairfield Centre and Blazing Rag at the Kents Bank Recreation Ground.

Buxton has two 18-hole golf courses. Cavendish Golf Club ranked among the top 100 in England. It was designed by the renowned Alister MacKenzie and dates from 1925. At Fairfield is Buxton & High Peak Golf Club. Founded in 1887 on the site of Buxton Racecourse, it is the oldest in Derbyshire.

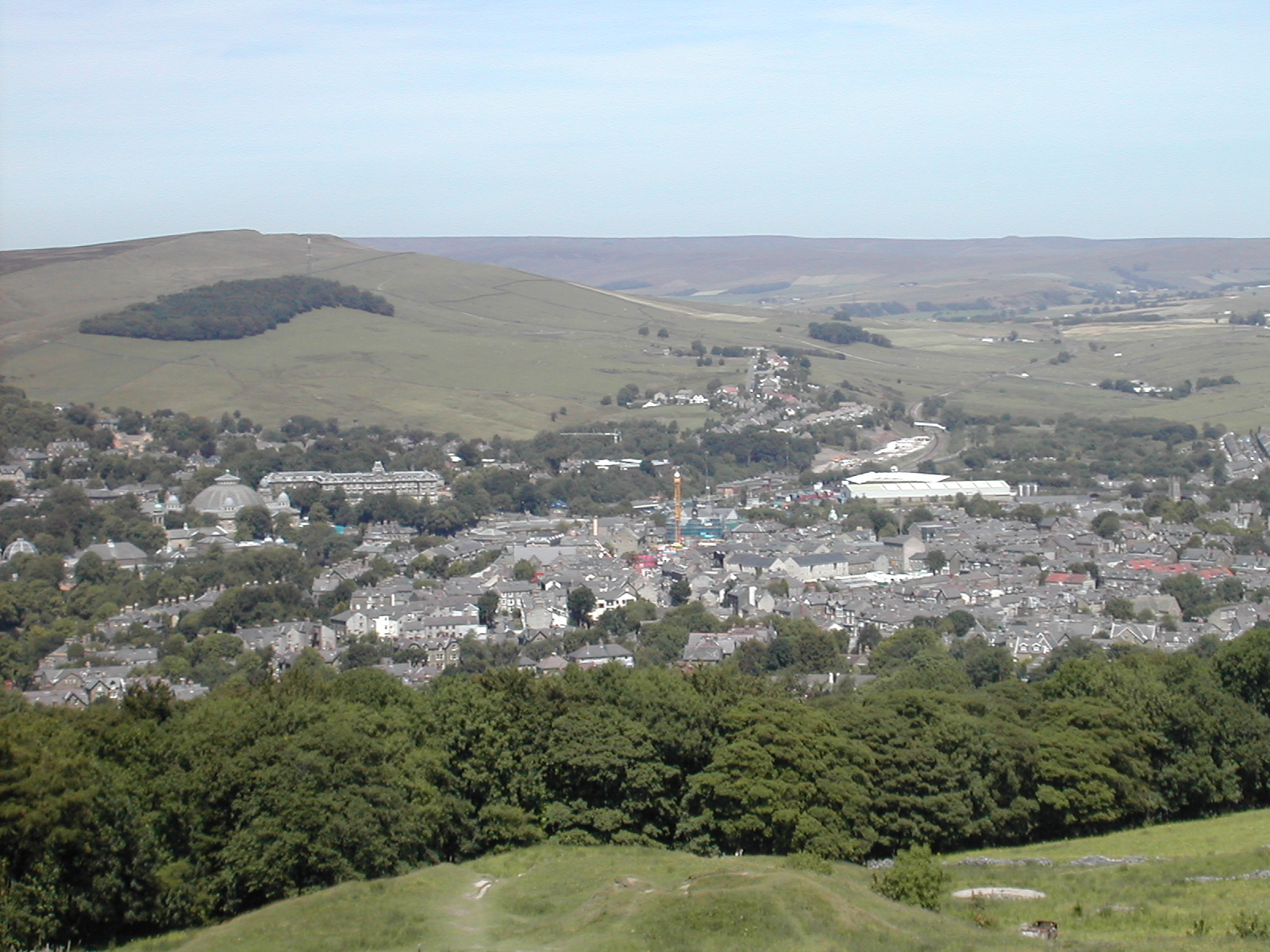
View of Buxton from Solomon's Temple

The hillside round Solomon's Temple is a popular local bouldering venue with many small outcrops giving problems mainly in the lower grades. These are described in the 2003 guidebook High over Buxton: A Boulderer's Guide. Hoffman Quarry at Harpur Hill, sitting prominently above Buxton, is a local venue for sport climbing.

Youth groups include the Kaleidoscope Youth Theatre at the Pavilion Arts Centre, Buxton Squadron Air Cadets, Derbyshire Army Cadet Force and the Sea Cadet Corps, in addition to units of the Scouts & Guide Association.

Buxton has three Masonic Lodges and a Royal Arch Chapter, which meets at the Masonic Hall, George Street. Phoenix Lodge of Saint Ann No. 1235 was consecrated in 1865, Buxton Lodge No. 1688 in 1877, and High Peak Lodge No. 1952 in 1881. The Royal Arch Chapter is attached to Phoenix Lodge of Saint Ann, and bears the same name and number, it being consecrated in 1872.

== Media ==
Regional TV news comes from Salford-based BBC North West and ITV Granada. Television signals are received from the Winter Hill and the local relay transmitters.

Local radio stations are BBC Radio Derby on 96.0FM and Greatest Hits Radio Derbyshire (High Peak) (formerly High Peak Radio) on 106.4FM.

The Buxton Advertiser is the town’s weekly local newspaper.

== Transport ==
=== Railway ===
Buxton railway station has a generally half-hourly service to Stockport and Manchester Piccadilly along the Buxton line; trains are operated by Northern. The journey to Manchester takes just under an hour.

==== History ====
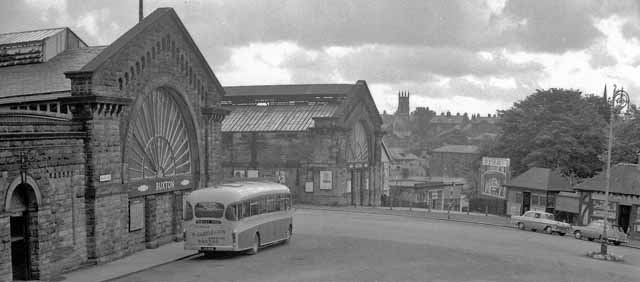
Station exterior in 1965. The present station is on the left and the former Midland Railway station is in the centre of the picture

Buxton had three railway stations. Two were aligned to the LNWR: Buxton and Higher Buxton; the latter was next to Clifton Road and closed in 1951. The third was Buxton (Midland), situated next to the LNWR terminus. The Midland Railway station, closed on 6 March 1967, became the site for the Spring Gardens shopping centre. The trackbed of the Manchester, Buxton, Matlock and Midland Junction Railway has, in part, been used as a walking and cycling path called the Monsal Trail.

==== Heritage ====
Peak Rail, a preserved railway group, has restored the section from Rowsley South to Matlock; it has long-term ambitions to reopen it through to Buxton.

=== Buses ===
The town is served by bus routes that cross the Peak District National Park, including to the nearby towns of Whaley Bridge, Chapel-en-le-Frith, New Mills, Glossop and Ashbourne.

The High Peak Transpeak service offers an hourly link southwards to Taddington, Bakewell, Matlock, Belper and Derby. The Skyline 199 route operates every half hour during the day to Manchester Airport, along the A6 through New Mills and Stockport. The Peak Pathfinder 62 operates three times a day to Chapel-en-le-Frith, Edale, Hope and Castleton.

Other services link Buxton with Macclesfield, Leek, Stoke-on-Trent, Sheffield, Chesterfield and Meadowhall.

=== Air ===
The nearest airports are Manchester Airport (22 miles away), Liverpool John Lennon Airport (48 miles) and East Midlands Airport (52 miles).

== Demography ==
In the 2011 census, Buxton's population was 98.3% white, 0.6% Asian, 0.2% black and 0.8% mixed/multiple. In 2021, the population of Buxton was 20,048 people, 97.5% of them white, 0.9% Asian, 0.3% black and 1% mixed/multiple race.

=== Religion ===
2021 census of religion in Buxton

| | Religion (Census 2021) | Number of people (2021) |
|---|---|---|
| Christian | 52.1% | 9,794 |
| Muslim | 0.29% | 55 |
| Hindu | 0.09% | 16 |
| Sikh | 0.02% | 4 |
| Buddhist | 0.54% | 101 |
| Jewish | 0.1% | 19 |
| Other religion | 0.57% | 108 |
| No religion | 46.3% | 8,699 |

== Famous Buxtonians ==
=== Public service ===
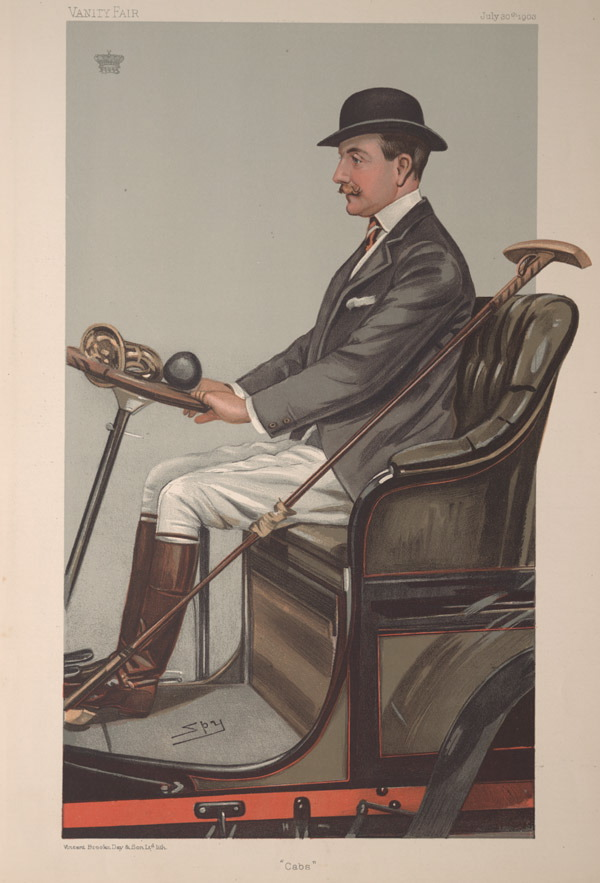
Charles Henry John Chetwynd-Talbot, Vanity Fair, 1903

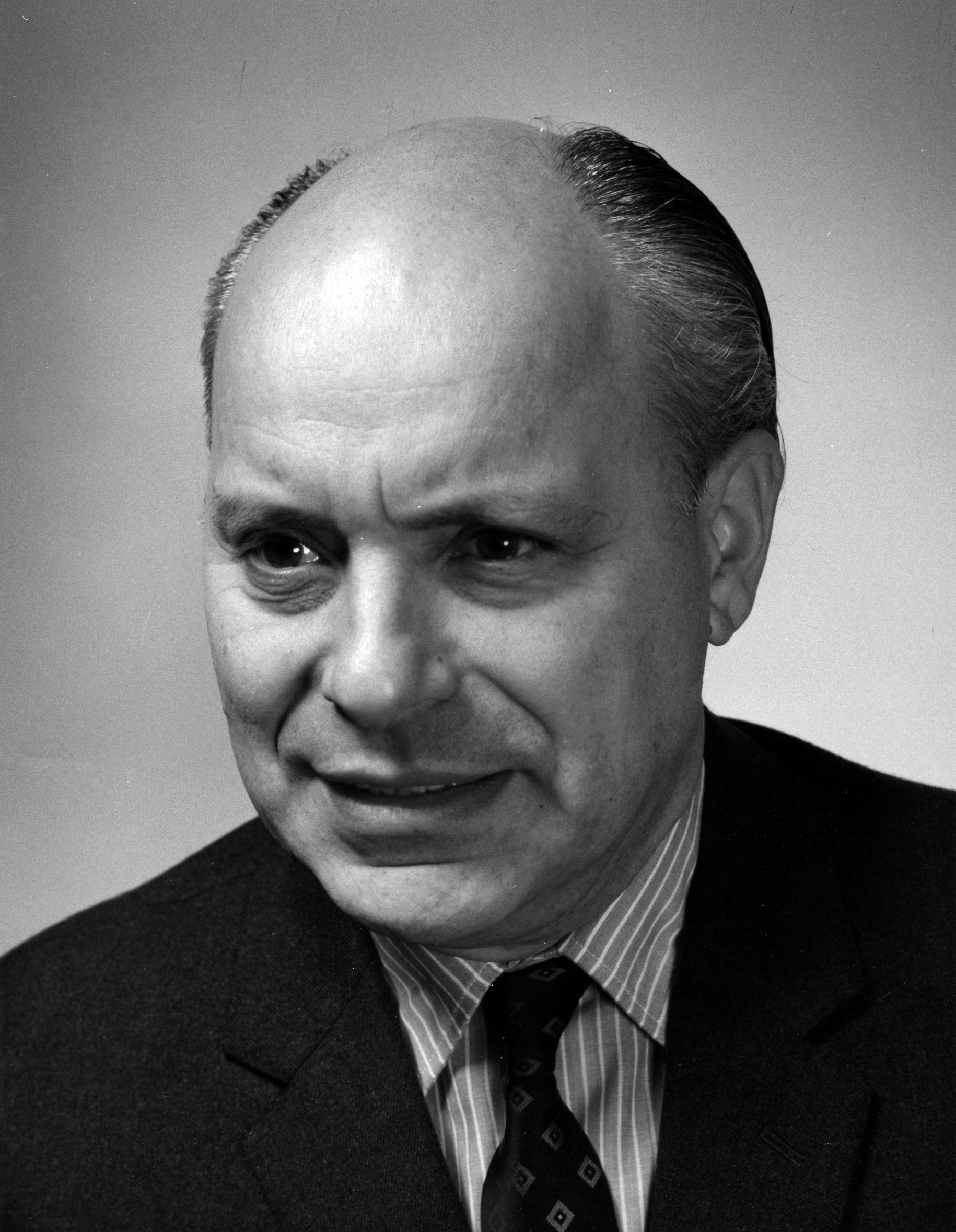
Herbert Eisner

- Charles Chetwynd-Talbot, 20th Earl of Shrewsbury (1860–1921), styled Viscount Ingestre, ran in the early 1880s a daily Greyhound (fast) coach service for the 20 miles from Buxton Spa to his house at Alton Towers.
- Henry Guppy (1861–1948), Librarian of the John Rylands Library in Manchester from 1899 to 1948, lived in Buxton.
- Rear Admiral Leonard Warren Murray (1896–1971 in Buxton), senior officer of the Royal Canadian Navy who played a significant role in the Battle of the Atlantic
- John Pilkington Hudson (1910 in Buxton – 2007), horticultural scientist and bomb disposal expert
- Herbert Eisner (1921–2011), British-German scientist high-expansion firefighting foam, playwright, schooled and lived in Buxton
- Tony Marchington (1955 in Buxworth – 2011), biotechnology entrepreneur and owner of the Flying Scotsman

=== Politics ===
- Hugh Molson, Baron Molson (1903–1991), Conservative MP for High Peak 1939–1961
- Sir Spencer Le Marchant (1931–1986), Conservative MP for High Peak 1970 to 1983
- Christopher Hawkins (1937–2023), Conservative MP for High Peak 1983–1992
- Tom Levitt (born 1954), Labour MP High Peak 1997–2010
- Andrew Bingham (born 1962 in Buxton), Conservative MP for High Peak 2010–2017

=== The Arts ===
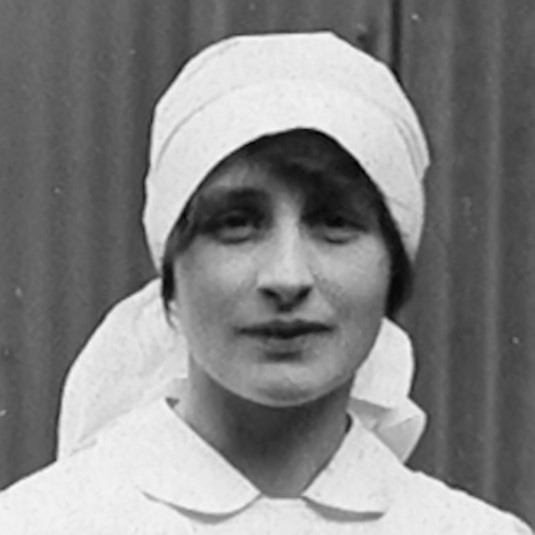
Vera Brittain

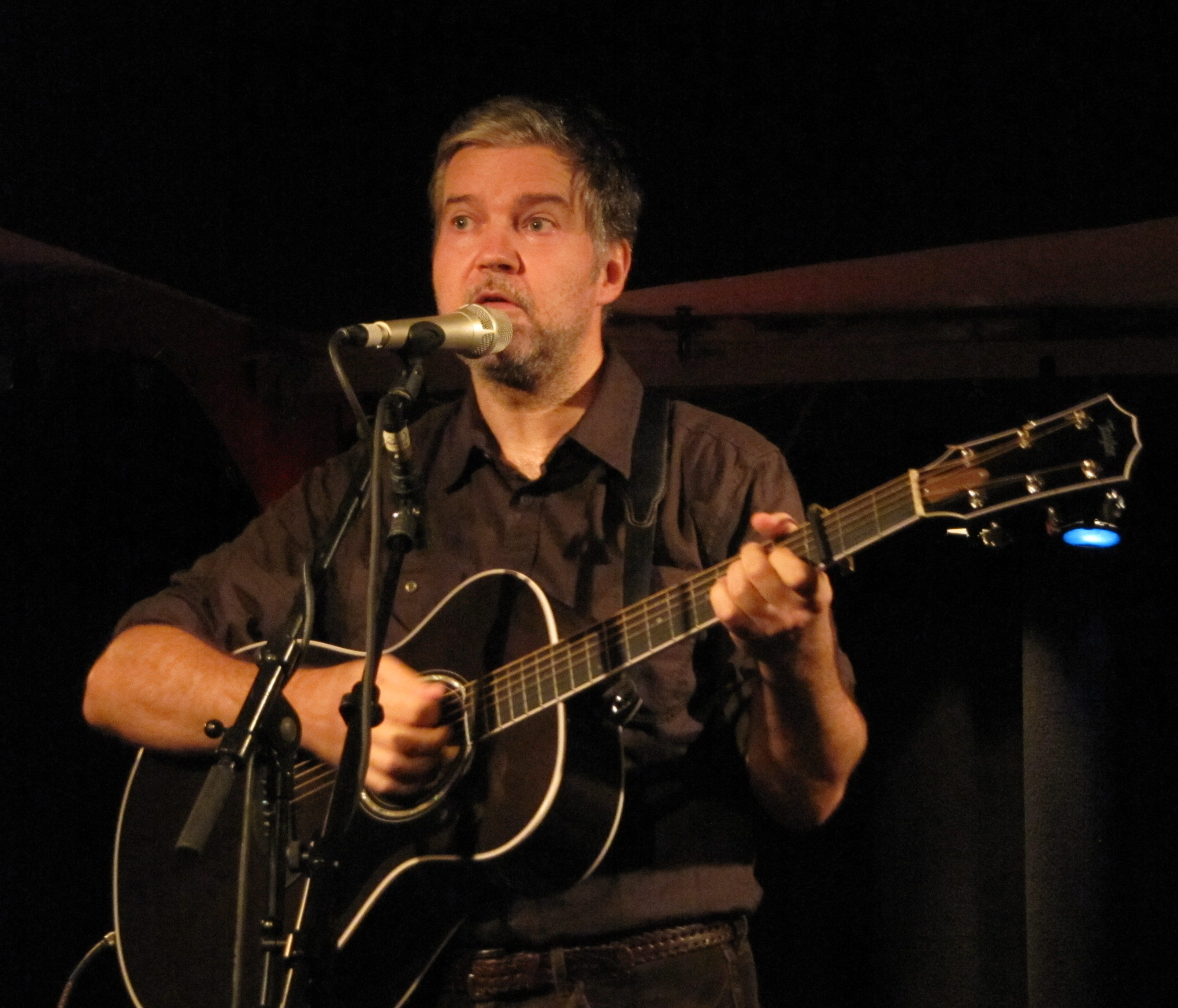
Lloyd Cole, 2010

- Orlando Jewitt (1799–1869), architectural wood-engraver
- Vera Brittain (1893–1970), author of Testament of Youth and mother of Shirley Williams, lived in Buxton from 1905 till 1915.
- Robert Stevenson, (1905–1986), Buxton-born director of Disney films including Mary Poppins
- John Buxton Hilton (1921–1986), Buxton-born crime writer
- Angela Flanders (1927–2016), Buxton-born perfumer
- Marjorie Lynette Sigley (1928–1997), Buxton-born artist, writer and actress, teacher, choreographer, theatre director and TV producer
- Elizabeth Spriggs, (1929–2008), Buxton-born character actress with the Royal Shakespeare Company
- Tim Brooke-Taylor (1940–2020), comic actor in The Goodies
- David Fallows (born 1945 in Buxton), musicologist specializing in music of the late Middle Ages and the Renaissance
- Dave Lee Travis (born 1945 in Buxton), disc jockey, radio and TV presenter
- Lloyd Cole (born 1961 in Buxton), musician, songwriter, frontman of Lloyd Cole and the Commotions
- Dan Rhodes (born 1972), writer, awarded the E. M. Forster Award in 2010, lives in Buxton.
- Bruno Langley (born 1983), actor, who played Adam Mitchell in Doctor Who and Todd Grimshaw in Coronation Street, was brought up in Buxton.
- Lucy Spraggan (born 1991), musician (folk, acoustic, hip hop pop), went to school in Buxton.
- Oliver Savile (born 1989), actor, who played in Wicked, Les Miserables and Pretty Woman, grew up in Buxton.
- Kate Butch, drag queen from series 5 of RuPaul's Drag Race UK, grew up in Buxton and attended Buxton Community School.

=== Sport ===
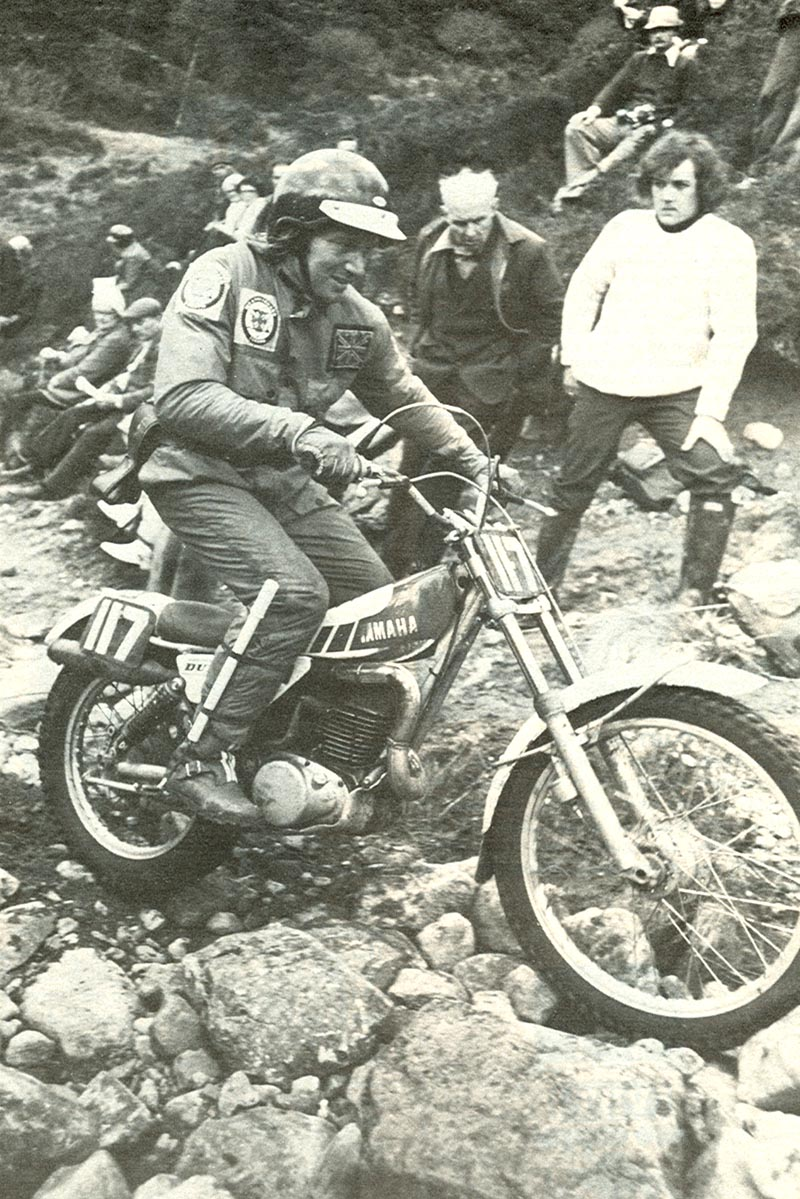
Mick Andrews, 1976

- William Shipton (1861 in Buxton – 1941 in Buxton), cricketer, later a solicitor in Buxton
- Fred Smith (1887 in Buxton – 1957), footballer before WWI, mainly for Macclesfield
- Bobby Blood (1894 in Harpur Hill – 1988), footballer for Port Vale, West Brom and Stockport
- George Bailey (1906 in Buxton – 2000), steeplechaser, competed at the 1932 Summer Olympics
- Frank Soo (1914 in Buxton – 1991), Stoke City F.C. footballer (173 pro appearances) and first mixed-race professional to represent England
- John Tarrant (1932–1975), long-distance runner, "The Ghost Runner", lived in Buxton.
- Mick Andrews (born 1944 in Buxton), former international motorcycle trials rider
- Les Bradd (born 1947 in Buxton), former footballer, over 580 pro appearances, all-time leading goalscorer for Notts County
- Carl Mason (born 1953 in Buxton), professional golfer
- Mark Higgins (born 1958 in Buxton), former Everton, Bury and Stoke footballer, 265 pro appearances
- Lorraine Winstanley (born 1975) and Dean Winstanley (born 1981), BDO darts players, live in Buxton.
- Ben Burgess (born 1981 in Buxton), Irish footballer, played for Hull City F.C. and Blackpool F.C.
- Abbie Wood (born 1999 in Buxton) swam in two finals at the 2020 Summer Olympics.

== Literature ==
Buxton's St Ann's Well and Poole's Cavern were listed as two of the Seven Wonders of the Peak, in Thomas Hobbes's 17th-century book De Mirabilibus Pecci: Being the Wonders of the Peak in Darby-shire, commonly called The Devil's Arse of Peak.

The Victorian diarist Anne Lister recounts her visit to Buxton during August 1816 in her journal.

Buxton is mentioned in James Joyce's Ulysses at the beginning of chapter 10. Father Conmee, a Jesuit priest, encounters the wife of David Sheehy MP and in their exchange says that he "would go to Buxton, probably, for the waters".

Vera Brittain grew up in Buxton and in her memoir Testament of Youth, she is critical of the town's snobbery.

A series of four recent novels by Sarah Ward – In Bitter Chill (2015), A Deadly Thaw (2017), A Patient Fury (2018) and The Shrouded Path (2019) – feature the fictional town of Bampton, which the author states "is partly based on Buxton with its Georgian architecture, Bakewell, a well-heeled market town... and Cromford with its canal and fantastic industrial heritage."

Bill Bryson recounts his visit to Buxton in his 2015 book The Road to Little Dribbling.

== See also ==
- Listed buildings in Buxton
- Buxton Hospital
- Cavendish Hospital
- Lightwood Reservoir
- Macclesfield group power stations
- Pubs and inns in Buxton
