= Angela Flanders =

British perfumer

Angela Margaret Flanders (4 December 1927 – 27 April 2016) was an English artisan perfumer. She established the London based perfume brand Angela Flanders.

== Biography ==
Flanders was born on 4 December 1927 in Buxton, Derbyshire. She attended the Manchester School of Art, studied Interior Design at the Inchbald School of Design and the Hackney Building College, intending to work with furniture.

In her early career, Flanders worked in theatre design, including at The Old Vic, and as a costume designer for the BBC. She also dealt in antiques at Camden Passage Market. In 1985, Flanders opened her first shop, in a former shoe shop dating from around 1850, on Columbia Road Flower Market in Bethnal Green.

In 1995, Flanders read a nineteenth-century perfume book, published by Mitchelle Beazley, and began producing artisanal perfumes. Her brand included 16 signature scents for women and a range of colognes for men and women based on historic scents.

In 2006, her scent Figre Noire was nominated for a Fragrance Foundation Award (FiFi Awards). In 2012, her scent, Precious One, created for her daughter, won Best New Independent Fragrance at the FiFi Awards. In 2010 her perfumery won The London Magazine‘s Great Little Shop Award.

== Personal life ==
In 1958, she married Michael Evans. They had a daughter, Kate Evans. The marriage was later dissolved.

== Death ==
She died on 27 April 2016, aged 88. Her daughter Kate now runs the Angela Flanders perfume company.

== Selected publications ==
- Aromatics (Mitchell Beazley, 1995)
