= Sarah Ward (novelist) =

English novelist and critic

Sarah Rhiannon Ward (living) is an English novelist and critic living in the Peak District of rural Derbyshire. She writes a crime fiction series as Sarah Ward and has also written a Gothic thriller as Rhiannon Ward.

== Works ==
=== Fiction ===
A series of four novels by Ward – In Bitter Chill (2015), A Deadly Thaw (2017), A Patient Fury (2018, chosen as "Thriller of the Month" by The Observer) and The Shrouded Path (2019) – are set in the Derbyshire Dales, where she lives. They feature a female detective, Connie Childs. The Northern English Lancashire Evening Post noted that the fourth novel is "moody, menacing and with more than a hint of the macabre... a mystery that grips like a raw day in the Peaks."

The books are set in and near the fictional town of Bampton, which the author states "is partly based on Buxton with its Georgian architecture, Bakewell, which is a well-heeled market town with a strong tourist industry, and Cromford with its canal and fantastic industrial heritage."

Ward's latest novel, The Quickening (2021), is described as a Gothic thriller. It appeared under the name Rhiannon Ward. All her books have been published in the United Kingdom by Faber. At least two have also appeared in the United States.

=== Critical work ===
Ward's critical work preceded her own novel-writing. She has written frequent accounts of work by others, in the British newspapers The Guardian and the Sunday Express magazine, in the freeby Metro and elsewhere, including the Los Angeles Review of Books. She still reviews crime fiction widely on her Crimepieces site.

Sarah Ward is Membership Secretary of the Crime Writers' Association and an associate board member of Derby Book Festival. She is also a judge for the Petrona Award for Scandinavian crime novels in translation.

== Private life ==
Ward related in a press interview: "I grew up in the neighbouring county of Cheshire and then after university in Liverpool, I lived first in London and then in Athens, Greece. When I returned to the UK I briefly lived in London but decided I preferred to be out of the capital so moved to Derbyshire.... [This] coincided with changes in my personal life."

Sarah Ward gained much information about British police procedures past and present from a cousin (named only as Peter), who retired as a chief inspector from the force in Dyfed–Powys Police, Wales.
