= Lightwood Reservoir =

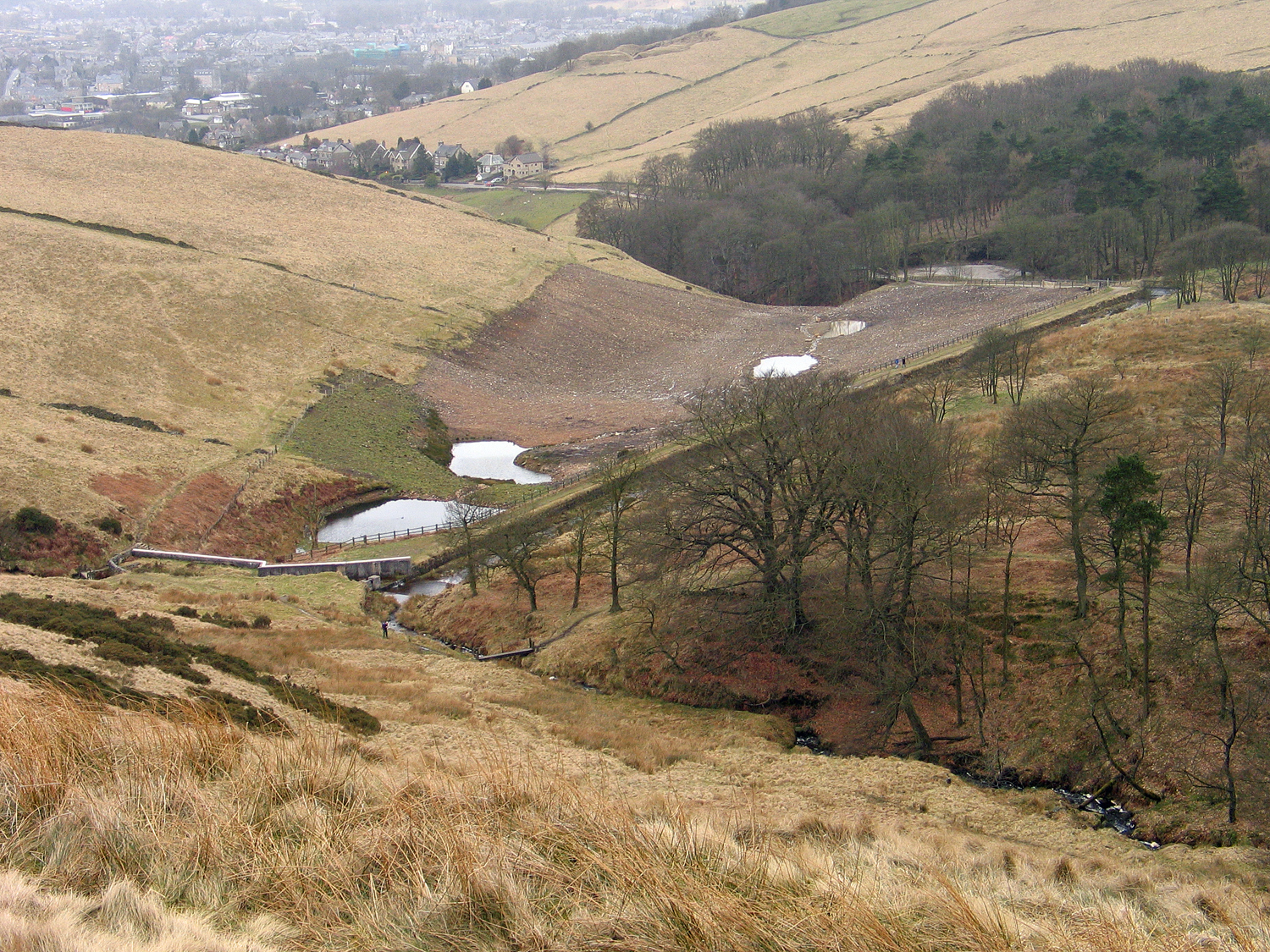
- Lightwood Reservoirs in 2006

- Location within Derbyshire
- Location: Derbyshire
- Coordinates: 53°16′22″N 1°55′11″W
- Type: reservoir
- Basin countries: United Kingdom

Lightwood Reservoir is an empty reservoir near the town of Buxton, Derbyshire, and associated wildlife reserve. Formerly operated by Severn Trent Water, the land is now owned by Nestlé and is the source of their Pure Life bottled water.
