= Lismore Fields =

Stone Age settlement in Buxton, Derbyshire, England

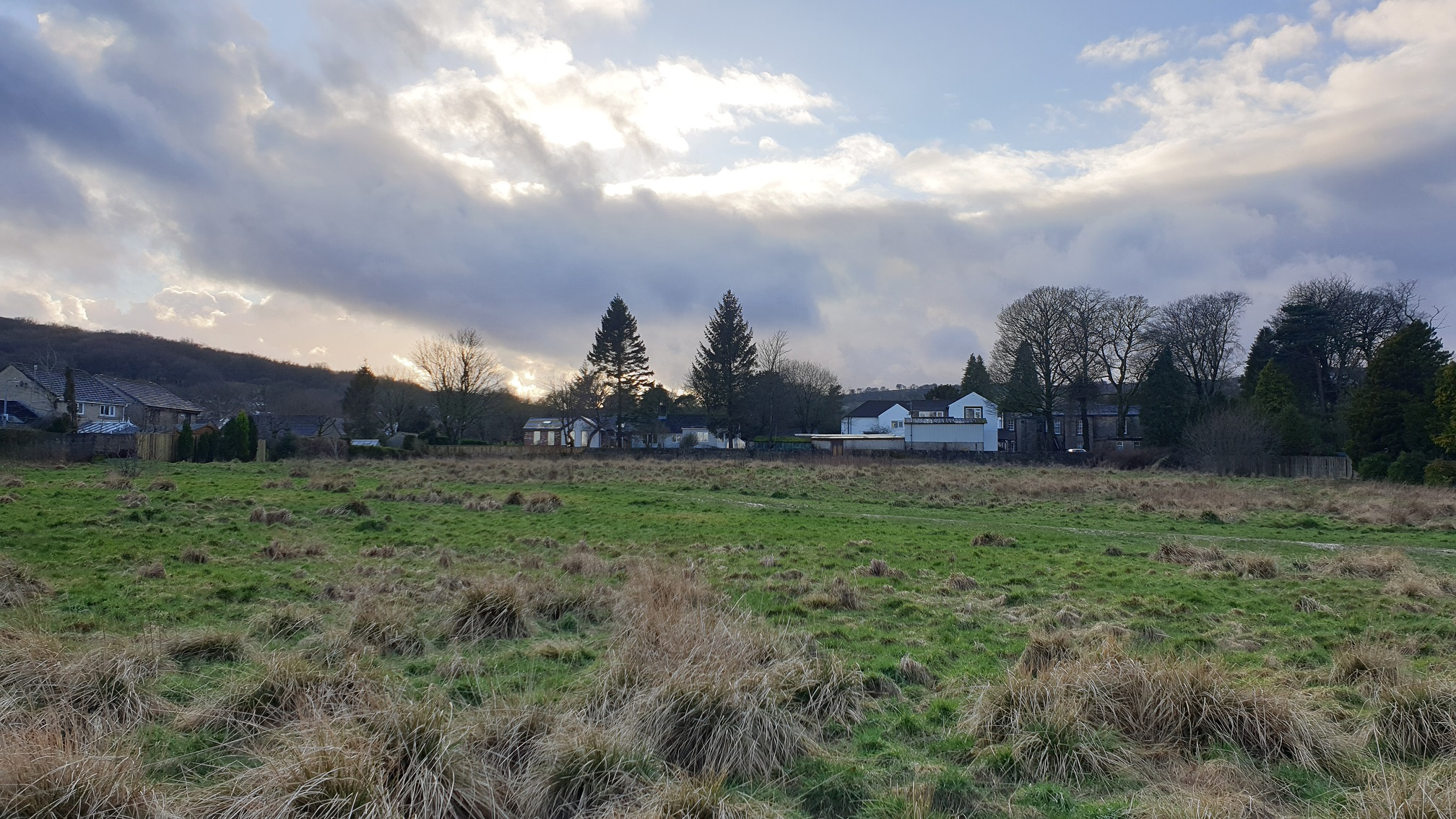
- Stone Age site
- Interactive map of Lismore Fields
- 53°15′21″N 1°55′36″W
- Type: Settlement
- Periods: Mesolithic and Neolithic
- Location: Buxton
- Region: Derbyshire, England

Site notes
- Condition: Buried remains
- Public access: Footpath
- Website: https://www.lismorefields.com/

Scheduled monument
- Official name: Lismore Fields Mesolithic and Neolithic settlement
- Reference no.: 1007019

Lismore Fields is the site of a Stone Age settlement in the town of Buxton, Derbyshire, England. It was discovered close to the River Wye in 1984 by the Trent and Peak Archaeological Trust during a search for a Roman road. The site is a protected Scheduled Monument. Lismore means "great ring fort" in Gaelic.

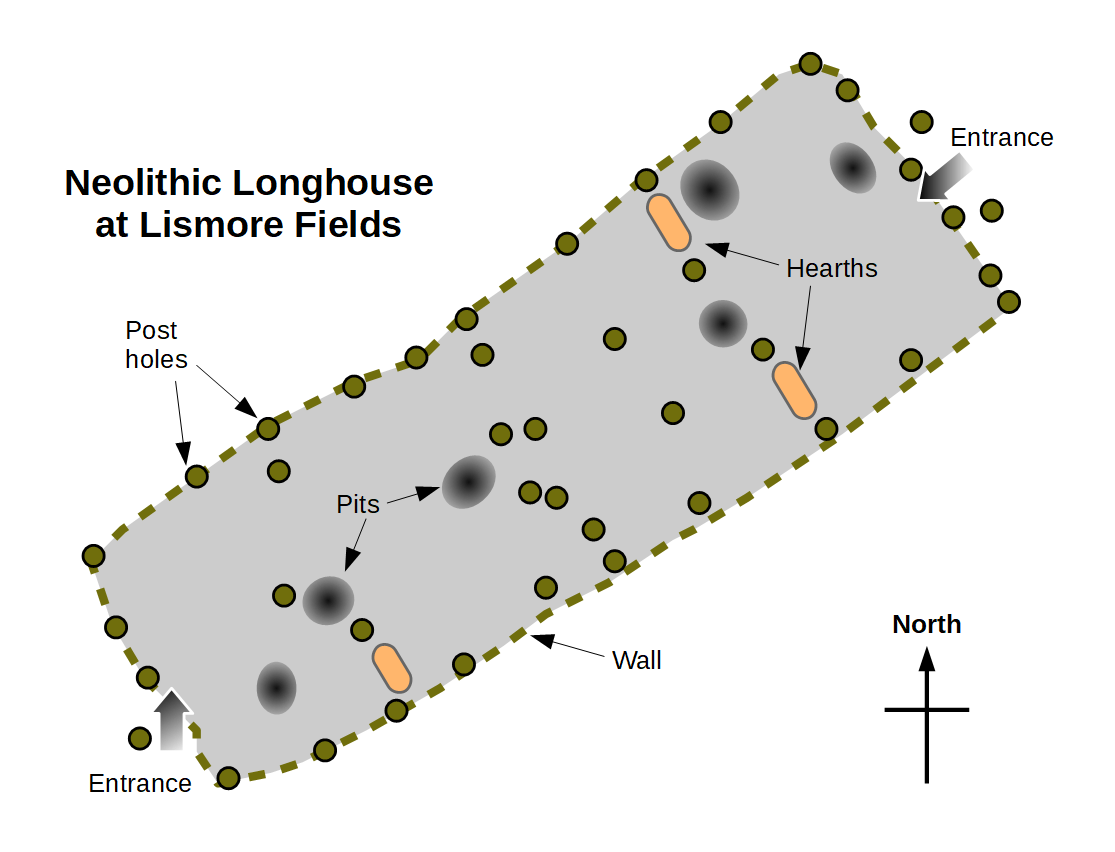

The first inhabitants of Buxton made their home at Lismore Fields 6,000 years ago. Excavation of the prehistoric settlement discovered the remains (floors, post holes and pits) of a Mesolithic timber roundhouse and of two Neolithic longhouses. The layout of these buildings can be clearly seen from the positions of the post holes. Flint implements were also found. Lismore Fields could be the earliest cereal cultivation site discovered in Britain. Cereal stores were revealed by the archeologists. Pollen analysis of soil samples and charred plant remains uncovered evidence of emmer wheat, crab apples, hazelnuts and flax. Researchers believe that this ancient site marks the period when Stone Age people developed from hunter-gatherers to farmers.

The site is one of just 75 early prehistoric scheduled monuments in England. It is the earliest known human settlement in the Peak District.

The "Lismore Pot" is a 5,500 year-old Grimston-ware bowl, pieced together from pottery fragments, and is one of the oldest pots ever found in Britain. It is on display in the Buxton Museum.

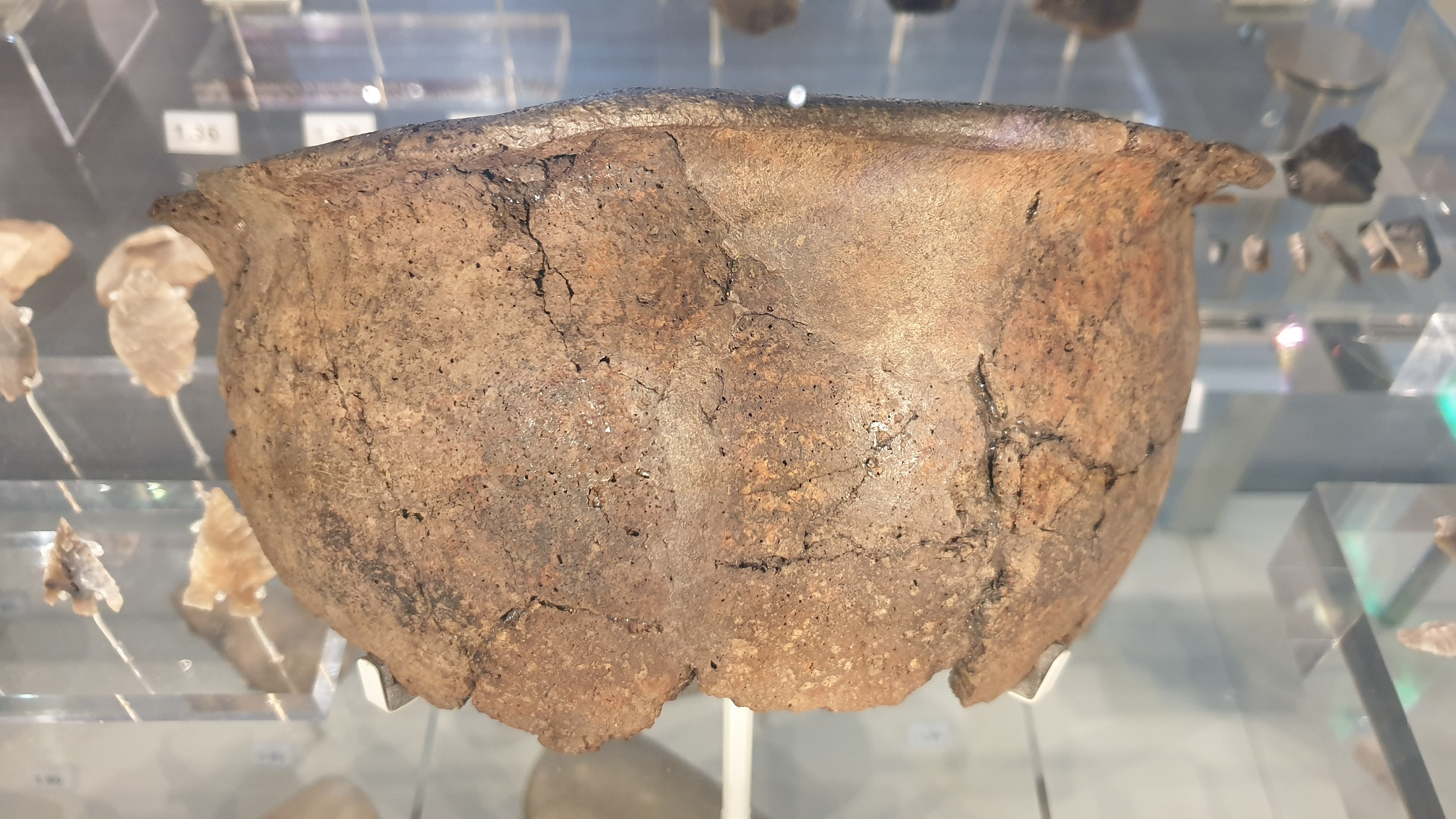
Lismore Pot - Stone Age bowl
