= St Thomas More Catholic School, Buxton =

St Thomas More Catholic Voluntary Academy

Location
- Palace Fields; Buxton, Derbyshire, SK17 6AF; England
- Coordinates: 53.2619°N 1.9136°W

Information
- Type: Academy
- Religious affiliation: Roman Catholic
- Local authority: Derbyshire
- Trust: St Ralph Sherwin Catholic Multi Academy Trust
- Department for Education URN: 146128 Tables
- Ofsted: Reports
- Headteacher: David Redfern
- Gender: Co-educational
- Age: 11 to 16
- Enrolment: 444 as of August 2020
- Website: https://www.stthomasmorebuxton.srscmat.co.uk/

St Thomas More Catholic Voluntary Academy is a co-educational Roman Catholic secondary school located in Buxton in the English county of Derbyshire. The school is named after Saint Thomas More, a sixteenth century elder statesman who was martyred for his refusal to accept King Henry VIII's claim to be the supreme head of the church. The school is under the jurisdiction of the Roman Catholic Diocese of Nottingham.

Previously a voluntary aided school administered by Derbyshire County Council, in September 2018 St Thomas More Catholic School converted to academy status leading to a name change. The school is now sponsored by the St Ralph Sherwin Catholic Multi Academy Trust. The Trust oversees twenty primary schools and five secondary schools across Derbyshire and Nottinghamshire.

St Thomas More Catholic Voluntary Academy educates pupils from all over High Peak, with some students travelling from Staffordshire and Cheshire to attend. The school offers GCSEs and BTECs as programmes of study for pupils.
