= Pubs and inns in Buxton =

Pubs and historic inns of Buxton in Derbyshire

The pubs and inns in Buxton are an important part of the historical character of the town of Buxton, Derbyshire, in England. The inns date back to the 16th century and several are listed buildings. Most are within the conservation areas of Higher Buxton, Central Buxton and Fairfield.

== Pubs and inns by district ==
=== Higher Buxton ===
Name	Image	Notes
Cheshire Cheese		A two-storey stone building from at least 1787 and is also set back from the High Street. It is a Grade II listed building, including its ornate iron railings with fleur-de-lys, urns and acorns design. It was once owned by Samuel Mycock who built Solomon's Temple on Grinlow hill. It is now run by Titanic Brewery.
Kings Head		The Kings Head is on the Market Place next to the Buxton Town Hall. It was originally built in 1725 as a parsonage. It is now run by Marston's Brewery. On the outside wall, there is a plaque marking the start and finish of the Peak District Boundary Walk (a circular 190-mile (310 km) walking trail).
London Road Inn		At the end of High Street for over 200 years, it used to be an Ind Coope brewery pub.
New Inn		A three-storey millstone grit building on the Market Place from around 1800. It was originally known as the New Sun Hotel and in the late 1840s as the New Inn and Yorkshire Commercial Hotel. It has been independently owned by Emma and Matthew Blackwood since 2024 after it was sold by Robinsons Brewery, who had owned it since 1838.
Old Sun Inn		Formerly The Sun and The Rising Sun. The is one of the oldest buildings in Buxton and was built in the 17th century as a coaching inn. The arch on the passageway to the rear coachyard has 'Good Stabling' inscribed on it. The inn is set back from the High Street so that coaches could pull up outside it to allow travellers to step off. Inside there is an old small 'courting' room, where parents could observe a courting couple through windows on either side. The interior has stone floors and oak panelling. It is owned by Marston’s and is one of their ‘managed partnerships’.
Queen's Head Hotel		An old coaching inn since the 1700s. It is set in a two- and three-storey building on High Street.
The Swan		Known also as the White Swan and formerly known as The Shoulder of Mutton. It is a two-storey stone building on the corner of Church Street and Bath Street. It was built as a coaching house before 1811. In about 1850 the inn was boycotted after a soldier was accused by the landlord of not paying for his drink, tied to a tree and flogged. It is a Grade II listed building and is now a free house.
The Vault		Bar on the market place in the former premises of the Halifax Building Society and with the old bank vault still in place.

=== Central Buxton ===
Name	Image	Notes
Buxton Brewery Tap House		The tap house is on George Street in the Old Courthouse buildings, which date from the mid-19th century (and were previously used as council offices and as Oram's car showrooms in the mid-20th century). Buxton Brewery started operations in 2009.
Milton's Head	The Milton's Head in the 1930s	Named after the 17th-century poet John Milton. It is a simple stone building on Spring Gardens dating from the early 19th century.
Old Clubhouse		A two-storey stone building on Water Street, opposite the Buxton Opera House. The Union Club was built in 1886 (designed by architect William Radford Bryden) as a gentleman's club for guests to the spa town. It is a Grade II listed building and is now run by Greene King brewery.
The Railway		The Railway Hotel was built on Bridge Street (in front of the railway viaduct) for the Chesterfield Brewery Company in 1864. It is now operated by Joseph Holt's Brewery.
RedWillow		The bar is located in the old William & Glynns Bank (later RBS Bank) building on Cavendish Circus. It was opened in 2018 by Macclesfield's RedWillow Brewery.

=== Fairfield ===
Name	Image	Notes
19th Hole		This pub on Waterswallows Road is close to the 18th green of the Buxton and High Peak Golf Club. It opened in 1950. The building was constructed in 1878 as Fern House. It is run by Martson's Brewery.
Bull's Head		A three-storey stone building on Fairfield Road which replaced the previous one (dating back to at least 1794) which was demolished in 1903.
Wye Bridge House	The Midland Hotel at Wye Bridge House in the 1800s	Wye Bridge House on Fairfield Road was originally a private residence by the River Wye. It became the Midland Hotel after the arrival of the railways in the 1863. It was called the Ashwood Park Hotel after Buxton Corporation bought it in 1921 during their redevelopment of Ashwood Park. It is now run by Wetherspoons.

=== Burbage ===
Name	Image	Notes
The Duke		Formerly the Duke of York Inn on St John's Road, it is an old two-storey stone building. It is owned by Heineken.

=== Harpur Hill and South Buxton ===
Name	Image	Notes
Blazing Rag		Originally the Manchester Arms (since at least 1881 until the 1990s) at 85 London Road and after 1921 at 105 London Road.
Parks Inn		The inn was built in the 1800s and was refurbished in 2019. It is owned by the Heineken-owned Star Pubs and Bars.

== Pubs of the past ==
Name	Image	Notes
Angel Inn	Winster Place c. 1850s	The Angel began as a coaching inn from at least 1773. It was demolished in 1849 when the Royal Hotel (later the Royal Exchange) was built at Winster Place on Spring Gardens. There was a Royal Vaults public bar in the Royal Exchange building until the 1950s.
Baker's Arms		The Baker's Arms at 26 West Road closed in 2008 and was converted into two houses called Bakers Cottages. It is the oldest building on its side of the road, with a mansard roof added later.
Devonshire Arms (Ashwood Dale)		A pub on the A6 Bakewell Road from the early 1800s until the 1990s. The building on the River Wye was originally a corn mill. The adjacent railway bridge (to Cowdale Quarry) overlooked the pub and is now demolished. Robinson's Brewery used to own the pub. The building is still there.
Devonshire Arms (Fairfield)		On North Road at Fairfield, with views across Fairfield Common and the golf course. Public house since at least 1811. Closed around 2008-2009 and converted into flats.
Dog and Partridge	28 High Street	The inn on High Street (across the road from the Sun Inn) operated from at least 1811 (as the Seven Stars and then called the Dog and Partridge from 1870). It closed around 1910 and the building was subsequently an ironmongers and in 2022 it is a tattoo parlour.
Eagle		The Eagle on the Market Place was built in 1760 by the 4th Duke of Devonshire as a Georgian spa hotel. The four-storey building replaced the earlier Eagle and Child Inn on the same site from 1592. This coaching inn was the dinner stop for the London to Manchester coaches. It was known briefly from 1903 as the Devonshire Hotel. It was operated by Hydes Brewery until late 2022, at which point it was closed and put up for sale by the brewery.
George Hotel		The hotel was built as a Georgian spa hotel in about 1770 on George Street. It was bought by the Duke of Devonshire in 1806. American ex-president Thomas Jefferson once stayed at The George. Much of the hotel was converted to the George Mansions apartments. The remaining George Inn closed in 2007.
Grove Inn	The Grove Hotel in the 1800s	The Grove Inn was a coaching inn dating back to the 1770s on the corner of Spring Gardens and Manchester Road. It became the Grove Hotel and was operated by Robinsons Brewery from 1937 until being closed in 2013. The hotel bar was called the Grove Vaults and later Charlie's Bar from the 1980s. The building is now empty except for the ground floor shops.
Horse Shoe Inn	29 Fairfield Road	A tavern on Fairfield Road from 1871 or before until the late 1950s. The building is now used as offices.
Jug and Glass	75-79 West Road	An alehouse on West Road (opposite Bath Road) from the early to late 1800s. The building was subsequently a sweet shop and a wine shop and is now a private residential house.
Prince of Wales		Built in 1858 at the lower end of Fairfield Road. In the early 1900s it served the local Marston, Thompson and Evershed brewery and later became owned and run by Marston's. It closed in 2011 and was converted into a funeral directors.
Red Lion		A pub on Holmfield road in Burbage from the 1820s to the 1920s/30s. It was subsequently Holmfield Bakery before being demolished.
Robin Hood		Heath House on London Road was bought by Martsons Brewery in 1953 and converted into a pub. It changed its name to the Robin Hood in 1969. It was closed in 2014, demolished and replaced by the new Premier Inn hotel, which opened in 2016.
Royal Forester		On Victoria Park Road in Fairfield. Built in c.1970. Closed in 2011 and since demolished.
Royal Oak		The inn (recorded in 1857) at Nithen on Manchester Road is now a farmhouse.
Shakespeare		The Shakespeare Hotel was built in 1711 near the old theatre on Tideswell Lane (now Spring Gardens). It was demolished in 1926 to make way for a Woolworths store.
Swan with Two Necks		A tavern on Windsor Road in Fairfield from at least the 1820s to 1840s. The building is now a private residential cottage.
Wheatsheaf Inn		The inn was behind The Swan on Church Street. It was a tavern from the early 1800s until about 1950. Marston's Brewery owned the pub in the early 1900s. The building is now a holiday cottage.
White Hart		This coaching inn occupied a four-storey building in Scarsdale Place (off Market Place) since before 1752. It was the breakfast stop for the Manchester to London coaches. It was renamed as The Scarsdale Arms in 1796 but was closed by1802 and was converted into 3 houses. The ground floor of the building is now a parade of shops.
White Lion	The White Lion Inn in the 1800s	The White Lion was built in 1798 as a carrier's inn on Tideswell Lane (now Spring Gardens). Traders set themselves up in the cobbled yard and used it as a base for transporting their goods. It was briefly known as the Marquis of Hartington's Arms. Marston's Brewery ran the pub before it closed in 2011. The White Lion and its adjoining stable block are Grade II listed buildings.

There are also historical records of other public houses: the Cheshire Cheese (on Macclesfield Old Road in 1842), the Fountain (on High Street in 1850s), the Fox and Hounds (on West Road), the Hatton and Holden, the Masons Arms (in 1811), the Oddfellows Arms (on High Street in 1864), the Red Lion (on Holmfield in Burbage in 1842) and the White Horse (in 1790).
