= Buxton Town Hall =

Municipal building in Buxton, Derbyshire, England

Town Hall
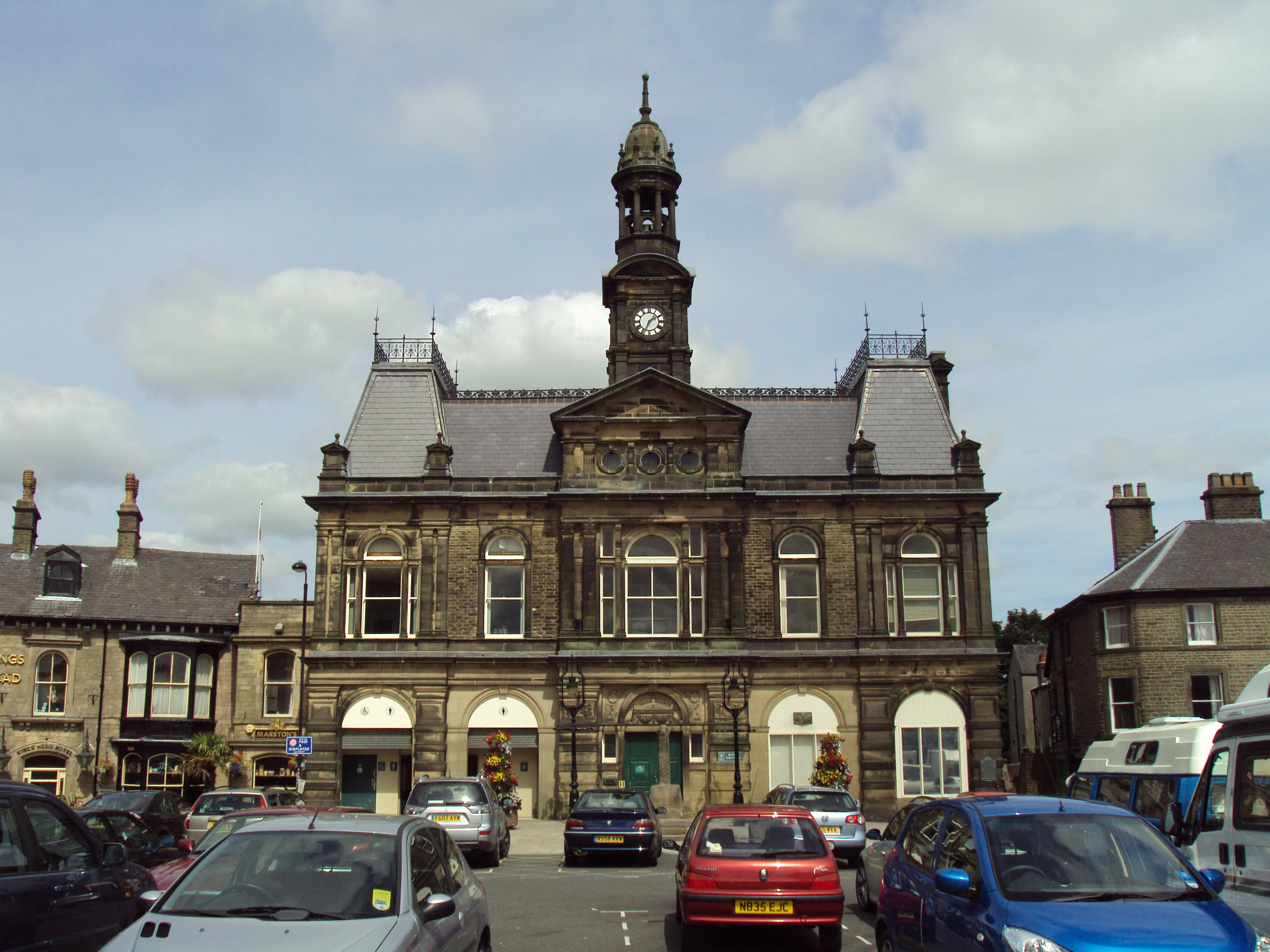
- Buxton Town Hall
- Interactive map of the Town Hall area

General information
- Location: Buxton, Derbyshire, England
- Coordinates: 53.2564°N 1.9136°W
- Elevation: 319m
- Construction started: 1887
- Completed: 1889

Design and construction
- Architect: William Pollard
- Designations

Listed Building – Grade II
- Designated: 31 January 1997
- Reference no.: 1259171

Buxton Town Hall was opened in 1889 on the Market Place in Buxton, Derbyshire, England. It lies in the town's central Conservation Area overlooking The Slopes. It is a Grade-II-listed building.

== History ==
The building was designed in the style of a French château (with a mansard roof crested with iron railings, Venetian windows and a clocktower with a cupola) by Manchester architect William Pollard (who also designed Buxton College's Gothic-style 'new building' in 1880). After the Market Hall (designed by Henry Currey) was destroyed by a fire in September 1885, the site was selected for the new town hall. The fire brigade with the town's new fire engine was unable to control the fire started by a paraffin lamp in one of the shops in the Market Hall. A competition was held in 1886 for the design of the new town hall. William Pollard's design won the £50 prize and James Salt's local firm was selected to build it at a tender of £8,900 (Salt also built the Entertainment Stage theatre, which is now the Pavilion Arts Centre). The chairman of the governing Local Board, Edward Milligan, laid the foundation stone in June 1887 (the year of the Golden Jubilee of Queen Victoria). The Marquess of Hartington conducted the official opening of the town hall on 26 June 1889.

The clock on the clock tower (by John Smith & Sons of Derby) was a gift from the Duke of Devonshire's tenants in 1889, in honour of Lord Frederick Cavendish, who was stabbed to death aged 45 in the Phoenix Park Murders in Dublin in May 1882 (shortly after arriving to take up his new post as Chief Secretary for Ireland). There is a bust of Lord Cavendish (son of the 7th Duke of Devonshire) on display inside the town hall. The clock struck the hours on a 5cwt bell.

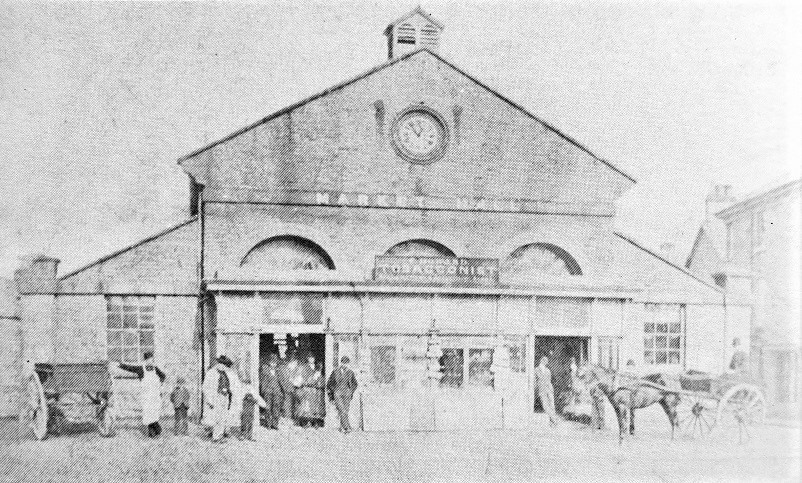
Buxton Market Hall 1857–1885

The previous town hall (known as Central Hall) was located in Eagle Parade on the Market Place in Higher Buxton. The old town hall had been a meeting place for the people of the town whereas the Local Board of Buxton met at the Old Courthouse to run the town's affairs. In 1894 the Local Board evolved into Buxton Urban District Council (UDC). In 1917 Buxton and Fairfield were combined into a single borough, with the town hall as its headquarters.

The town hall was built from high-quality millstone grit from the local Nithen Quarry at Corbar Hill. The arches at either side were initially open arcades but were subsequently converted into internal rooms. The town hall contained the first free public library in the town. There was originally a ballroom on the first floor, which is now offices.

In front of the town hall is the 15th-century market cross. During the 20th century the cross was moved from the centre of the market place to sit next to the 1840 drinking fountain (at the top of Fountain Street) and later to its current position. Before 1813 (when the town was granted a market charter) it had stood on Cockerd Hill (now Palace Fields). The market cross is a Grade-II-listed monument.

== Current use ==
High Peak Borough Council, formed in 1974, presently has administrative centres at Buxton Town Hall and Glossop Town Hall. Full Council meetings are usually held in Buxton or at Chapel-en-le-Frith Town Hall.

== See also ==
- Listed buildings in Buxton
