= The Slopes, Buxton =

Historic listed park in Buxton, Derbyshire

The Slopes
- The Terrace, St Ann's Cliff
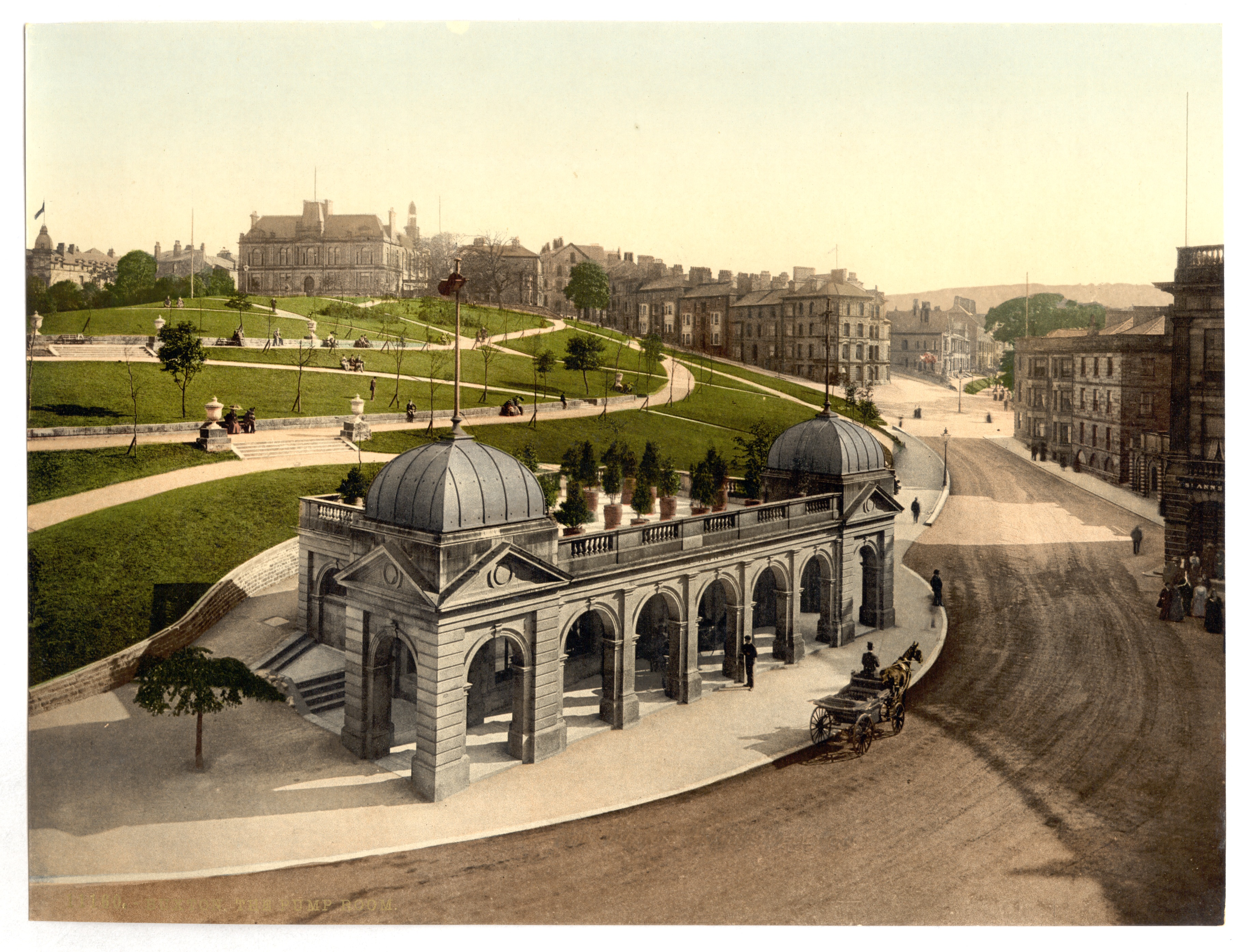
- The Terrace and the Pump Room in 1905
- Interactive map of The Slopes
- Location: Buxton, Derbyshire
- Coordinates: 53°15.5′N 1°55′W
- Area: 3 hectares (7.4 acres)
- Elevation: 300 m (980 ft)
- Created: 1811
- Designated: 6 March 2000
- Designer: Jeffry Wyatville
- Designation: Grade II Listed Park

The Slopes (formerly known as The Terrace) is a Grade-II-listed public park in Buxton, Derbyshire in England. The area was laid out by landscape architect Jeffry Wyatville in 1811 for William Cavendish, 6th Duke of Devonshire, as pleasure grounds for the guests of The Crescent hotel to promenade. The design of The Terrace was modified further by Sir Joseph Paxton in 1859.

The grassed bank of The Slopes lies between the Town Hall and Higher Buxton at the top and St Ann's Well and the Pump Room (into which the Buxton spring mineral waters were piped) at the bottom, facing The Crescent hotel, the Victorian spa baths and the Old Hall Hotel. The terraced area is intersected with numerous footpaths. The Terrace had previously been a bare hillside known as St Ann's Cliff. In 1787 Major Hayman Rooke uncovered a long section of the Roman town wall, which is now beneath the landscaped hillside of The Slopes. At the same time Rooke also documented details of the base of a temple in the same area, overlooking the site of the baths and springs. The temple was dedicated to the water deity Arnemetia. It had a shrine room set on a rectangular podium, with a columned portico at the front.

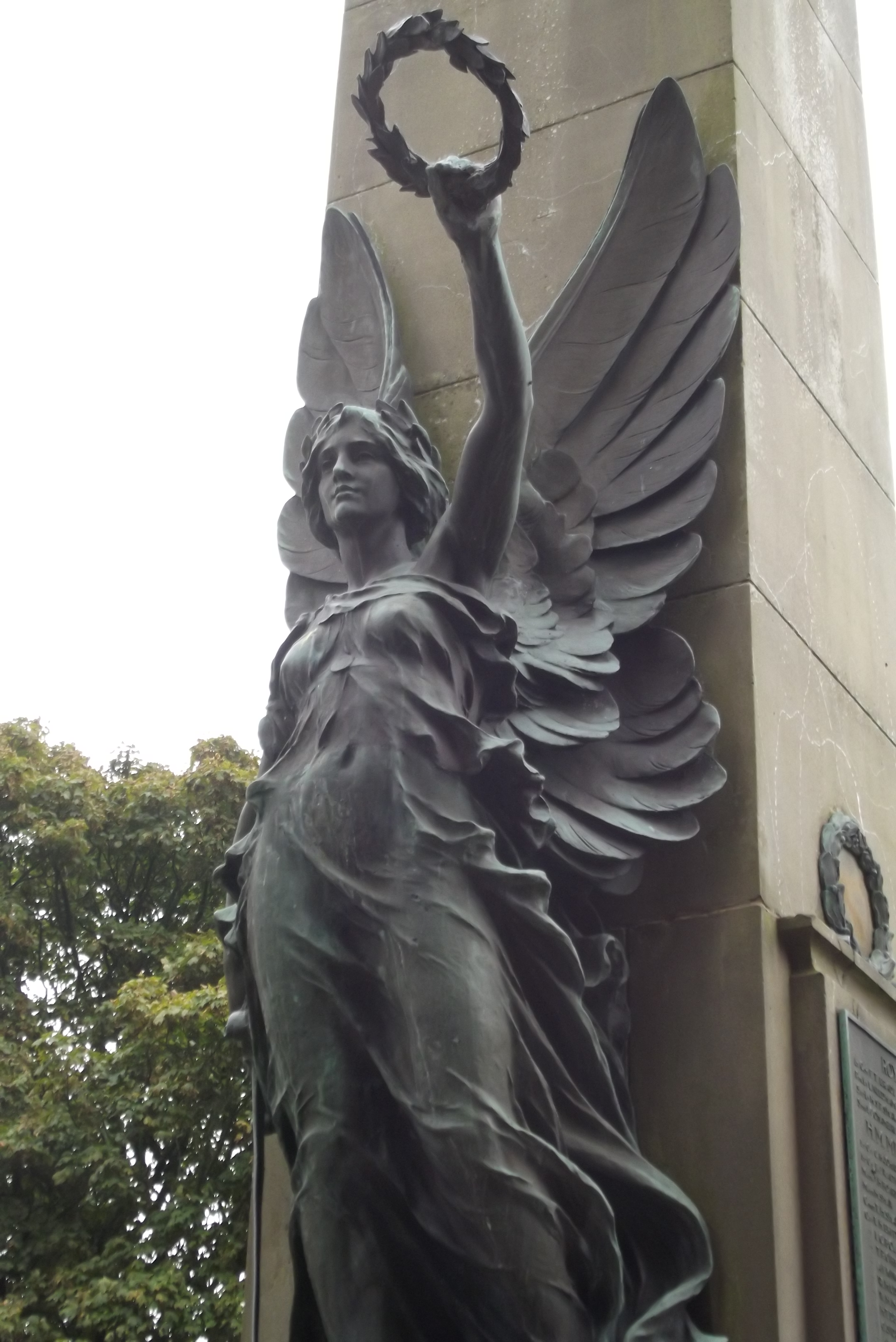
War memorial on The Slopes

Twelve Grade-II*-listed 18th-century decorated limestone urns (originally from Lord Burlington's estate at Londesborough Hall in Yorkshire) are set on gritstone plinths along walled footpaths and stone steps.

Buxton Town Hall looks down from the top of The Slopes. It was designed by William Pollard in a French Renaissance style and built between 1887 and 1889.

The Grade-II-listed war memorial from c.1920 commemorates the soldiers from Buxton who perished in the two World Wars. An ashlar obelisk on a stepped platform is fronted by a bronze statue of Winged Victory holding a sword and a laurel wreath. The sculptor was Louis Frederick Roslyn.

The Met Office climatological station for Buxton is situated on The Slopes directly above the war memorial. The instruments at the station record various meteorological measurements (including temperatures, rainfall, humidity and wind speed and direction), which are read daily by volunteers. Buxton's weather was formally recorded in the grounds of Devonshire Royal Hospital since 1865. The climatological station was relocated to its present site in 1925. It is one of the oldest weather stations in the UK.

The Slopes were restored in 1994 with grants from the European Commission and English Heritage.

== See also ==
- Listed buildings in Buxton
