= Listed buildings in Buxton =

Buxton is a spa town in the High Peak district of Derbyshire, England. The town contains 93 listed buildings that are recorded in the National Heritage List for England. Of these, one is listed at Grade I, the highest of the three grades, seven are at Grade II*, the middle grade, and the others are at Grade II, the lowest grade. That the town was a source of natural water springs has been known at least since Roman times, and during the medieval period, St Ann's Well was a shrine and a place of pilgrimage. Buxton developed into a spa town during the 18th and 19th centuries, largely under the influence of the Dukes of Devonshire. The water was considered to have curative powers, and this led to the building of bath houses and later a hospital. Later, leisure facilities grew, and were served by the Pavilion Gardens, and the building of a conservatory, a theatre, a concert hall, and an opera house.

A number of the listed buildings are associated with these developments. Most of the other listed buildings are houses and associated structures, in particular those forming The Crescent, which is listed at Grade I. The other listed buildings include hotels and public houses, churches and items in churchyards, a market cross, shops and offices, two drinking fountains, a screen wall at the railway station, a postbox, the town hall, a railway viaduct, and three war memorials.

== Key ==
Grade	Criteria
I	Buildings of exceptional interest, sometimes considered to be internationally important
II*	Particularly important buildings of more than special interest
II	Buildings of national importance and special interest

== Buildings ==
Name and location	Photograph	Date	Notes	Grade
Market Cross; 53.25676°N 1.91419°W		15th century (probable)	The market cross was moved to its present position in the 20th century, and is in stone. It is weathered, and consists of a rectangular tapering shaft, with shallow rounded projections to the top. The cross stands on a tapered block and a stepped base.	II
Old Hall Hotel; 53.25825°N 1.91526°W		1572	A house later altered and extended and converted into a hotel, it is in gritstone on a plinth, with quoins, bands, a moulded cornice, a parapet, and hipped Welsh-slate roofs. There are three storeys, a front of five bays, the outer bays slightly projecting, and two- and single-storey extensions. The central doorway has Tuscan Doric columns, an entablature, and a moulded concave surround. The windows are sashes with moulded surrounds.	II*
St Anne's Church; 53.25378°N 1.91570°W		1625	The church, which incorporates earlier material, was later altered, including the addition of a vestry in 1715. It is in stone with a stone slate roof, and has a single storey and an L-shaped plan. There is no division between the nave and the chancel, and there is a gabled north porch and a south vestry. On the west gable is a gabled bellcote, and on the east gable is a cross finial.	II*
85 Green Lane, outbuilding and walls 53.24959°N 1.92492°W		17th century (possible)	The farmhouse and attached outbuilding are in whitewashed stone with a stone slate roof. The farmhouse has two storeys and two bays. It contains two doorways, one blocked, and casement windows. The outbuilding is without a roof, and attached to the front are dry stone garden walls.	II
87 Green Lane and walls 53.24952°N 1.92512°W		17th century (possible)	The farmhouse is in whitewashed stone with a stone slate roof, two storeys, two bays, and a lean-to on the right. It contains a doorway, a probable blocked doorway, and casement windows. Attached to the front are dry stone garden walls.	II
Sun Inn; 53.25439°N 1.91511°W		Mid-18th century (probable)	A coaching inn, later a public house, it is in rendered and painted stone on a plinth, with a Welsh-slate roof, and two storeys. On the front is a doorway with a hood and sash windows, and to the left is a segmental-arched carriage entrance with a dormer above. At the rear is a gabled wing, a lean-to, and casement and sash windows.	II
The Old Court House, shops and restaurant 53.25925°N 1.91501°W		Mid-18th century	The building, which was altered in 1803–06, has served as a court house, a Masonic hall, and later as a café and restaurant. It is in millstone grit with a Welsh-slate roof. The main block has two storeys and five bays, a sill band and a parapet, and contains a central doorway and sash windows. To the left is a recessed wing with three storeys and two bays, with round-headed windows in the ground floor and an external staircase. To the right of the main block is a two-storey three-bay wing, and further to the right is a single-storey two-bay wing containing two round-headed openings with an impost band and keystones.	II
Urns, walls and steps, The Slopes; 53.25837°N 1.91383°W		1753	The twelve urns were moved from Londesborough Hall in 1818 by Jeffry Wyatville and were altered in 1859 by Joseph Paxton. They are in limestone on gritstone plinths, and each urn has a pedestal. The lower part is decorated with leaves, the upper part with a Vitruvian scroll frieze and a Greek key frieze, and on the top is a circular cap with leaf decoration. The urns are set on gritstone walls on the terraces and flanking the steps.	II*
Eagle Hotel and Market Place Arcade; 53.25626°N 1.91489°W		1760	A coaching inn, later extended and converted into a hotel and shopping arcade, it is in gritstone and has a Welsh-slate roof with coped gables and kneelers. There are four and three storeys and attic, and a front of nine bays. The central bay projects slightly with rusticated pilaster strips, and it contains a doorway with a moulded surround, a fanlight, and a pediment on console brackets. The windows are sashes with moulded surrounds, and in the ground floor to the left is a modern shopfront. In the left return is a three-storey five-bay wing containing the entrance to Market Place Arcade, and a two-storey canted bay window.	II
Grove Hotel and Parade; 53.25922°N 1.91294°W		c. 1770	A hotel with shops on a corner site, the canopy and shopfronts added in 1883. The building is in stuccoed gritstone with sill bands and a Welsh-slate roof. On Terrace Road are four storeys and nine bays, on Spring Gardens are three storeys and attics, and three bays, and a canted bay on the corner. The canopy has cast-iron columns and is glazed, the central section in Terrace Road has a segmental inscribed arch with an ornate wreath, and in Spring Gardens is a smaller similar arch. In the ground floor are shopfronts with recessed doorways, and the hotel entrance has pilasters, and a segmental pediment on paired brackets. In the upper floors are sash windows, and the Spring Gardens side has three dormers, two gabled, and one with a flat roof.	II
The George Public House and Mansions; 53.25905°N 1.91560°W		c. 1770	The public house and hotel are in stone with hipped Welsh-slate roofs. The main block has four storeys and six bays, and contains a doorway with a fanlight and a moulded segmental head, sash windows, and three dormers. To the left is a two-storey two-bay wing with a two-storey canted bay window in the right bay. The north front has three storeys, seven bays, and two-storey single-bay wings. It contains sill bands, and in the centre is a segmental-headed doorway with columns, a moulded surround, and a keystone. The windows are sashes, those in the middle floor with segmental heads.	II
9 Terrace Road; 53.25815°N 1.91251°W		Late 18th century	A house, later offices, in millstone grit on a plinth, with vermiculated quoins, a vermiculated floor band, dentilled eaves, and a Welsh-slate roof with coped gables and kneelers. There are two storeys and an attic, an L-shaped plan, and a front of three bays. The central doorway has a moulded surround, a fanlight and a hood on brackets. This is flanked by canted bay windows, and in the upper floor are sash windows with moulded surrounds, and hoods and sills on brackets. In the attic is a segmental-headed dormer, and in the left return is a two-storey canted bay window.	II
Bath House; 53.25342°N 1.91995°W		Late 18th century	The house is in pebbledashed stone with gritstone dressings, quoins, and a roof of tile at the front and stone slate at the rear. There are three storeys and an L-shaped plan, with a front of three bays and a two-storey rear wing. In the centre is a gabled porch, and to its left is a two-storey canted bay window. The other windows are sashes, most with Tudor hood moulds.	II
Buxton House; 53.25670°N 1.91333°W		Late 18th century	A pair of shops with living accommodation above, in limestone with millstone grit dressings, quoins, sill bands, chamfered eaves, and a Welsh-slate roof with coped gables. There are three storeys and an attic, and three bays. The central doorway has Tuscan Doric columns, a round-headed doorway with a fanlight, and a broken swan-necked pediment. Above it is a round-headed window with a moulded surround and a keystone. In the outer bays, the ground floor contains shopfronts with central doorways, and above them are oriel bow windows. In the top floor are sash windows, and the attic has a round-headed dormer.	II
Longden Court; 53.25909°N 1.91026°W		Late 18th century	A lodging court, later a shop and residential accommodatiton, in millstone grit, with quoins, three storeys and a front of ten irregular bays. There are doorways in the ground and middle floors, the latter approached by external steps. The windows on the front are sashes, and at the rear are casements and a two-light mullioned window.	II
The Swan Public House; 53.25405°N 1.91543°W		Late 18th century	The public house is in limestone with a slate roof. There are three storeys, and fronts of three bays. The bays on the Bath Street front are gabled, the middle bay slightly recessed, and the gables are coped with kneelers. The front contains two doorways with fanlights, a large bow window in the middle floor, and the other windows are a mix of sashes and casements. The Church Street front has a doorway with a hood, and a similar mix of windows, one of which is mullioned.	II
The White Lion and stable block 53.25911°N 1.90938°W		Late 18th century (probable)	The public house is in millstone grit with Welsh-slate roofs, and is in three parts. The left part has three storeys, two bays, and quoins, and the central part is the same height with four storeys and two bays. Both parts have doorways with quoined surrounds, and the windows are sashes, those in the ground floor with quoined surrounds. The openings in the lower two floors have wedge lintels. The right part has three storeys, two bays, and an oriel window. At the rear is a range of single-storey outbuildings, one of which was possibly a stable block.	II
The Crescent; 53.25912°N 1.91467°W		1780–88	A range of buildings with a semicircular plan designed by John Carr. It is in stone and brick with Welsh-slate roofs, and has three storeys at the front, four at the rear, and basements. In the ground floor is an arcade of 27 rusticated round-headed arches, above which is a blind balustrade. Between the bays in the upper floors are giant fluted Roman Doric pilasters, and above is an entablature, and a balustrade with shaped balusters interspersed with panels, and in the centre is a Cavendish coat of arms. The upper floors contain sash windows with a guilloché band between the floors. At the ends are returns of five bays with similar features.	I
Devonshire Royal Hospital; 53.26010°N 1.91670°W		1785–90	The building originated as stables designed by John Carr. It was converted into a hospital from 1859 by architect Henry Currey. The domes and clock tower were added in 1881–82, as a major extension of the hospital, designed by Robert Rippon Duke. After the closure of the hospital in 2000, it became part of the University of Derby. The building is in gritstone and has a roof of slate and copper domes. There is a square plan with canted corners, two storeys, eleven bays on each side, and three bays on the corners. The courtyard is covered by a large slated dome with a lantern surmounted by a cupola, on the east front is a clock tower with a lead dome and a weathervane, and on each corner is a lantern, each with an octagonal copper dome with a finial. The middle three bays of the south front project and formed the original entrance. It has a pediment and an inscribed frieze, and on the apex is an urn moved from elsewhere.	II*
Cheshire Cheese Public House and railings 53.25410°N 1.91492°W		c. 1787	A coaching inn, later a public house, it is in stone with a Welsh-slate roof. There are mainly two storeys, and seven bays, the right three bays higher and with a rusticated front. On the front are two canted bay windows and a large semicircular bay window, all with splat balustrades, and a porch. The other windows are sashes. In front of the building are ornate iron railings.	II
2a, 2b and 2–5 Hall Bank; 53.25739°N 1.91493°W		1793	Three pairs of lodging houses, later houses and offices, stepped down a hill, in millstone grit with Welsh-slate roofs. There are three storeys, and each pair has four bays. In each pair is a central round-arched entry into a house with an L-shaped plan. The outer bays of each pair contain a two-storey canted bay window, and elsewhere are sash windows.	II
6 Hall Bank; 53.25726°N 1.91485°W		c. 1795	A house in a terrace in millstone grit, flanked by pilaster strips with vermiculated rustication, an eaves band, a cornice, a low parapet, and a Welsh-slate roof, and three storeys. In the ground floor is a shopfront, with a doorway and fanlight to the left, over which is a fascia board. In the middle floor are three two-light casement windows with mullions, and the top floor contains three two-light round-headed casements with vermiculated surrounds, keystones and a sill band.	II
Columbine; 53.25721°N 1.91479°W		c. 1795	A terraced house, later a restaurant and flats, it is in millstone grit, with a pilaster strip with vermiculated rustication on the left, a sill band, an eaves band, a cornice, a low parapet, and a Welsh-slate roof. There are three storeys and two bays. In the left bay is a doorway with a fanlight and a sash window, and above is a canted oriel window on brackets, and the right bay contains a canted two-storey bay window. In the top floor are two round-headed two-light casement windows with keystones, and at the rear is a stair window, and a single-storey extension.	II
Tombstone to John Kane; 53.25358°N 1.91575°W		1799	The tomb and headstone in the churchyard of St Anne's Church are to the memory of the comedian John Kane. It is in gritstone with a kerbed slab in front, and the partial remains of iron railings. There is an inscription on the headstone.	II
Cranford; 53.25835°N 1.91916°W		c. 1800	The house, which was later extended, is in stone on a plinth, with sill bands, bracketed eaves, and a Welsh-slate roof with coped gables and kneelers. There are three storeys and three bays. The central doorway has a moulded surround, a fanlight, and a hood forming the sill to the sash window above, which has a moulded surround. To the left is a two-storey canted bay window, and the other windows are sashes. In the right return are two two-storey canted bay windows. At the rear is a two-storey extension with a porch.	II
New Inn; 53.25643°N 1.91361°W		Late 18th or early 19th century	A hotel, later a public house, in millstone grit on a plinth, with a sill band, and a Welsh-slate roof. There are three storeys and four bays. The round-headed doorway has pilasters and a fanlight, set in a rusticated round arch, and the windows are sashes. At the rear is a bracketed eaves cornice and a gabled dormer.	II
1–6 The Square; 53.25864°N 1.91579°W		1803–06	A row of six apartments designed by John White, later offices and flats, in gritstone with a floor band, an eaves band and moulded cornice, and a hipped Westmorland slate roof. There are three storeys and a front of 16 bays. On the ground floor is an open arcade of 16 round arches with impost blocks, and behind are doorways with fanlights. The upper floors contain sash windows, and each return has ten bays with similar features.	II*
St John the Baptist's Church; 53.25896°N 1.91726°W		1811–12	The church was designed by John White in Neoclassical style, and the east portico was infilled in 1896–97 to form a chancel. The church is built in gritstone with a slate roof, and has a cruciform plan. At the west end are four Doric pilasters carrying a pediment, and a doorway with a moulded surround and a fanlight, flanked by rectangular windows, and with three circular windows above. At the east end are square and circular columns, a Venetian window, and a pediment containing an inscribed panel. The tower rises from the west pediment, and has a square base on which is a cupola, with four round arches and pilasters, an octagonal panel stage with ball finials and a copper octagonal dome with a weathervane. On the sides are round-headed windows with moulded surrounds.	II*
1–6 Bath Road, walls, railings and gates 53.25346°N 1.91903°W		Early 19th century	A row of six houses in stone with pilasters, floor bands, moulded eaves, and Welsh-slate roofs, hipped on the right and with coped gables. Each house has three storeys, and the features include round-arched doorways, a three-storey canted bay window, canted oriel windows, and sash windows with keystones. Attached to the front of the houses are low stone walls with chamfered copings, and iron railings and gates.	II
Drinking fountain, Market Place; 53.25575°N 1.91516°W		Early 19th century	The former drinking fountain or well head in Market Place is in weathered stone. It consists of a square pedestal with a cornice on the top. On the sides are recessed panels, the panel on the front with an arched head. It was previously surmounted by a bowl-shaped urn.	II
The Savoy Hotel; 53.25769°N 1.91516°W		Early 19th century	A hotel, later offices and flats, in millstone grit on a plinth, with sill bands, bracketed eaves and hipped Welsh-slate roofs. There are three and four storeys, and an asymmetrical curved front of seven bays. In the angle between the blocks is a porch with two round arches, a column between, pilasters, a moulded cornice, carved spandrels, and a parapet, and the bay to the right has a gable containing a circular window. Some of the windows are sashes and some are curved.	II
Grinlow Tower; 53.24272°N 1.92056°W		1840	The tower, also known as Solomon's Temple, was originally built as a project for the unemployed; it was rebuilt in 1894 (to a design by local architect William Radford Bryden and his student George Edwin Garlick) and restored in 1987. It is built in limestone with gritstone dressings, and consists of a circular tower with two storeys. In the ground floor is a doorway with a round head approached by four steps, and seven round-headed windows with keystones. Above is a chamfered sill band, and in the upper floor is a circular opening over the door and seven round-headed openings, all blind. At the top is a moulded eaves band and an embattled parapet.	II
16 and 17 Broad Walk; 53.25526°N 1.91804°W		Mid-19th century	A pair of semi-detached houses in gritstone on a chamfered plinth, with quoins, a sill band, bracketed overhanging eaves, and a hipped Welsh-slate roof. There are three storeys, and each house has three bays. In the central bay is a doorway with moulded pilasters, a fanlight, and a cornice, above which is a segmental-headed sash window with a keystone. The outer bays contain two-storey canted bay windows, and in the top floor are sash windows, those in the outer bays tripartite.	II
24 Broad Walk and The Argyle; 53.25387°N 1.91891°W		Mid-19th century	A pair of semi-detached houses, later used for other purposes, in millstone grit with projecting boxed eaves on shaped modillion brackets, and a Welsh-slate roof. There are three storeys and each house has three bays. In the middle bay of each house is a doorway with a segmental-arched head, a moulded surround, side lights, an arched fanlight, and a shaped keystone, and above is a sash window with a segmental head. The doorway is flanked by two-storey canted bay windows, and the top floor contains sash windows, tripartite in the outer bays.	II
2a, 2b, 2c, 2d, and 3 Cavendish Villas, and 3a Broad Walk; 53.25727°N 1.91574°W		Mid-19th century	A row of three houses, later divided, in millstone grit on a plinth, with sill bands, moulded eaves, and a Welsh-slate roof. There are two storeys, attics and basements, and each house has three bays, the outer bays being pavilions with a pediment. Each house has a central doorway with a fanlight, approached by steps, above which is a sash window, and the flanking bays contain a two-storey canted bay window. In the attic of the pavilions is a round-headed casement window, and between are five dormers.	II
Two bollards between 11 and 12 Broad Walk; 53.25599°N 1.91749°W		Mid-19th century	The two bollards stand on the junction of Fountain Street with Broad Walk. They are in cast iron and are slightly tapering, each with three tiers of paired horizontal bands and shaped baluster tops.	II
Four bollards at northeast end of Broad Walk; 53.25771°N 1.91553°W		Mid-19th century	The four bollards at the northeast end of the walk are in cast iron. They are slightly tapering, each with three tiers of paired horizontal bands and shaped baluster tops.	II
Four bollards at southwest end of Broad Walk; 53.25375°N 1.91921°W		Mid-19th century	The four bollards at the southwest end of the walk are in cast iron. They are slightly tapering, each with three tiers of paired horizontal bands and shaped baluster tops.	II
Lamp standards, Broad Walk; 53.25940°N 1.91376°W		Mid-19th century	The 15 lamp standards are set along the northwest side of the path, and are in cast iron. Each standard has an octagonal base, and a tapering two-tier shaft reeded at the top and fluted below. This is surmounted by cross bars, and a 20th-century sectioned glass lantern with an acorn finial. There are inscriptions on the base and above the cross bars.	II
Cavendish House; 53.25603°N 1.91721°W		Mid-19th century	The house is in gritstone on a chamfered plinth, with floor bands, an impost band, overhanging eaves on carved brackets, and a hipped Welsh-slate roof. There are two storeys and a symmetrical front of three bays. The central round-headed doorway has a moulded surround, a fanlight, and an inscribed keystone. This is flanked by canted bay windows, and the top floor contains round-headed sash windows with keystones.	II
Derby House; 53.25577°N 1.91752°W		Mid-19th century	The house, later used for other purposes, is in millstone grit on a plinth, with vermiculated quoins, a floor band, overhanging eaves on stone brackets, and a Welsh-slate roof. There are two storeys and an attic, and a front of three bays, the left bay gabled. The central doorway has a segmental-headed surround, moulded imposts, an inscribed fanlight, and a keystone, and above is a round-headed window with a keystone. In the left bay is a two-storey bay window, rectangular in the ground floor and canted above. The right bay contains a two-storey canted bay window with a hipped lead roof. In both returns are bay windows and dormers.	II
Grosvenor House Hotel; 53.25748°N 1.91554°W		Mid-19th century	A house, later a hotel, in millstone grit on a plinth, with impost and sill bands, overhanging eaves on brackets, and a Welsh-slate roof. There are three storeys and attics, three gabled bays, and a single-storey extension to the left. The doorway has a segmental head, a chamfered surround, a fanlight, and carved imposts and a keystone. Above it is a segmental-headed sash window, to the left is a two-storey canted bay window, and to the right is a single-storey bay window. In the attics are round-headed sash windows with keystones.	II
Grosvenor Mansions; 53.25686°N 1.91626°W		Mid-19th century	A row of three houses in millstone grit on a chamfered plinth, with quoins, floor bands and sill bands, and a Welsh-slate roof. There are three storeys, attics and basements, and each house has three gabled bays. The middle bay of the central house has a projecting porch with Ionic columns, a moulded cornice and doorway with a fanlight. The outer houses each has a central doorway with pilasters, a moulded cornice and a fanlight, above which is a sash window. Each doorway is flanked by two-storey canted bay windows, in the top floor are segmental-headed sash windows, and the attics contain similar, smaller windows.	II
Former Hartington Hotel; 53.25502°N 1.91824°W		Mid-19th century	A house, later used for other purposes, in millstone grit on a plinth, with sill bands, bracketed overhanging eaves, and a Welsh-slate roof with coped gables. There are three storeys and an attic, and three bays. The central doorway has a moulded hood on console brackets, and above it is a round-headed sash window with a keystone. The outer bays contain two-storey canted bay windows. In the top floor are segmental-headed sash windows, and above is a dormer with a circular window.	II
Manor House and Barton House; 53.26102°N 1.91932°W		Mid-19th century	A pair of semi-detached houses in millstone grit with rusticated quoins, bracketed eaves, and a hipped Welsh-slate roof. There are two storeys and a basement, and six bays, the outer bays slightly projecting and gabled. In the ground floor is a verandah with cast-iron columns and ornate spandrels, and doorways with side lights and fanlights, and the upper floor contains sash windows, those in the outer bays with round heads. On the sides are porches with moulded cornices and parapets, and arched doorways with pilasters and fanlights.	II
Roseleigh Hotel and Sherwood House; 53.25473°N 1.91839°W		Mid-19th century	A pair of houses in millstone grit on a chamfered plinth, with a half-hipped Welsh-slate roof. There are three storeys and attics, and each house has three bays. There is a central doorway in each house, with pilasters and a fanlight, and above is a sash window in a moulded surround. These are flanked by two-storey canted bay windows. In the top floor are sash windows and a central inscribed plaque, and in the right house are three gabled dormers.	II
Sandringham Hotel; 53.25555°N 1.91778°W		Mid-19th century	Three houses later combined into a hotel, the building is in millstone grit on a plinth, with vermiculated quoins, sill bands, and a hipped Welsh-slate roof. There are three storeys and attics, and a front of five bays. In the centre is a segmental-arched doorway with a moulded impost, a fanlight, and a keystone, and above it is a segmental-headed casement window. On the front are four canted bay windows, between the bay windows and in the top floor are sash windows, and in the attic are three dormers, two gabled and one with a flat roof. In the left return are three three-storey bay windows and a lean-to porch.	II
Westminster Hotel and Eton House; 53.25442°N 1.91867°W		Mid-19th century	A pair of semi-detached houses, later a hotel and a house, in millstone grit on a chamfered plinth, with bands, bracketed eaves, and a hipped Welsh-slate roof. There are three storeys and each house has three bays. In the centre of each house is a doorway with pilasters, a fanlight and a hood, and above it is a single-light window. The doorway is flanked by two-storey canted bay windows, and in the top floor are sash windows, those in the outer bays tripartite.	II
Tomb to Philip Heacock; 53.25892°N 1.91779°W		1851	The tomb in the churchyard of St John the Baptist's Church is to the memory of Philip Heacock, agent to the Duke of Devonshire. It is in gritstone with a square plan, and consists of an open round-arched canopy with a dome. Each arch has a moulded surround and a keystone, over which is a pediment decorated with a laurel wreath and acroteria. Inside is an altar with an inscribed copper plaque and a coat of arms, and on it is an urn with a gadrooned base and a moulded top. The memorial is surrounded by a kerb with railings.	II
Winster Place; 53.25908°N 1.91245°W		1851	A hotel, later a row of shops, in stone with vermiculated quoins, a moulded floor band, a dentilled cornice, and a parapet. There are three storeys, and a curved front of twelve bays. In the centre is a recessed doorway with Ionic square and round columns, a fanlight, and a hood on paired brackets. The other ground floor bays contain rusticated segmental or round arches with doors or shop windows. The upper floor contain casement windows. The window above the doorway has a moulded surround and an open pediment on brackets, and the window above it has a segmental head, a moulded surround, and a cartouche. The other windows in the middle floor have alternating segmental and triangular pediments, and in the top floor they have segmental heads and keystones.	II
Natural Mineral Baths; 53.25851°N 1.91513°W		1851–53	The baths, later an information centre, were designed by Henry Currey. The building is in gritstone with a Welsh-slate roof, partly glazed. There is a single storey and five bays, the middle three bays projecting and rusticated. Each bay contains a round-headed arch, the central one with a doorway and the others with windows. Above is a parapet, the middle three bays with inscriptions, and the outer ones with balustrades.	II
Cavendish Shopping Arcade; 53.25933°N 1.91394°W		1853	Originally thermal baths designed by Henry Currey, they were remodelled in 1900 by William Radford Bryden, and converted into a shopping arcade in 1984–87. The building is in gritstone, with timber and glass shopfronts, and a roof of Welsh slate, a stained-glass barrel vault roof, and areas of flat roof. There is a complex plan, overall rectangular arranged around a courtyard, mainly with a single storey, and with later, taller blocks with two and three storeys. The principal front has an arcade of ten bays, with an entablature and a balustraded parapet with urns. The round arches have clustered pilasters, moulded imposts, and keystones.	II
John Duncan School, Wye House; 53.26445°N 1.91863°W		1853	A house designed by Henry Currey in French château style, it is in millstone grit on a plinth, with bands, moulded eaves, and a mansard roof in Westmorland slate. There are two storeys and attics, and a symmetrical front of seven bays. The central doorway has a moulded surround, and above it is a segmental-headed sash window with a moulded surround, and an oval dormer. The flanking bays contain three-light sash windows in each floor, and above are pavilion roofs with two-light gabled dormers. The next bays are recessed with oval dormers, and on the corners are two-storey canted bay windows with pavilion roofs and oval dormers. As of 2009 it was in use as a hotel.	II
1–9 The Quadrant; 53.25977°N 1.91384°W		c. 1860	A crescent of nine shops with offices above, in gritstone with an eaves band and moulded eaves cornice, and Welsh-slate roofs. There are three storeys, and the bays are divided by pilaster strips with vermiculated rustication. In the ground floor, two shops have retained an arcade of three arches, and in the other shops these have been replaced by modern shopfronts. In the middle floor, each shop has a three-light mullioned window with flat heads, and the top floor has three mullioned windows with round heads and keystones. The bottom end is curved and contains a doorway with Tuscan Doric columns.	II
Screen wall, Buxton railway station 53.26051°N 1.91374°W		1863	The wall was built by the London and North Western Railway and is in millstone grit. The right part of the wall is gabled and contains a large lunette with ornate radial glazing bars. The surround is moulded, with moulded impost bands, and is inscribed with the name of the railway. It is flanked by wide pilasters with a moulded cornice on moulded corbels. The gable is coped, and under it are round-headed corbel arches. To the left is a lower wall with a central round-arched doorway, above it is a decorative iron bracket, and it is flanked by blind panels with a dentilled course. The corresponding wall built by the Midland Railway has been demolished.	II
14 Cavendish Arcade and 3-6 The Colonnade; 53.25940°N 1.91376°W		1864	A parade of shops to which the canopy was added in 1909. It is in sandstone, largely rendered, with shopfronts in timber and glass, a roof of Welsh slate, and a cast-iron canopy. Some shopfronts have segmental heads, the others have flat heads, and in the parade is the entrance to the Cavendish Arcade. The canopy is glazed, and has 18 ornate cast-iron columns on plinths, with floriated spandrels, and a frieze with interlocking circles.	II
Seven bollards at junction with Station Road; 53.26018°N 1.91353°W		1864	The bollards are in cast iron, and are about 85 centimetres (33 in) high. Each bollard has a fluted tapering column, surmounted by an open cube with a recessed panel on each face. The first and third bollards have pyramidal tops, and the date is on each column.	II
Postbox; 53.25866°N 1.91619°W		1866	The postbox designed by John Penfold is in cast iron. It has a hexagonal plan on a moulded base, and a moulded and decorated ogee cap with an acorn finial. Over the posting slot is the royal coat of arms, and flanking it are "POST" and "OFFICE". Below it is a collection times plate in a moulded surround under the initials "VR".	II
Lodge and gate, Devonshire Royal Hospital; 53.26044°N 1.91623°W		1868	The lodge is in stone on a chamfered plinth, with moulded eaves on brackets, and a slate roof. There is a single storey and a T-shaped plan. The southeast front has an open pediment, and contains a three-light window with columns and a keystone, and the other bays are gabled with two-light windows. In the angle is a porch with two round arches and keystones, and a column between them. In front of the lodge is a low wall with chamfered coping, and tall square gate piers with chamfered bases and moulded tops, surmounted by iron lanterns with glass globes.	II
Palace Hotel; 53.26085°N 1.91521°W		1868	The hotel was designed by Henry Currey in French château style. It is in millstone grit on a moulded plinth, with an impost band, a floor band, a moulded eaves cornice on brackets, a parapet of iron railings, and mansard roofs in Welsh slate with ornate iron ridge railings. There are three storeys, an attic and a basement, a front of 17 bays, and a left return of seven bays with an angled wing. The middle five bays project, and the two end bays also project and have pavilion roofs. The central porch has cast-iron columns, and above is a balcony, an attic with an open pediment containing a Venetian window, and a truncated pyramidal roof with iron cresting. The attic windows have segmental heads and finials.	II
Carlisle House; 53.25412°N 1.91868°W		1869	A house in millstone grit on a chamfered plinth, with bracketed eaves and a hipped Welsh-slate roof. There are two storeys and attics, and a front of three bays. The central doorway has pilasters, an inscribed cornice, and a fanlight. Above it is a sash window with a moulded surround and a datestone. The outer bays contain two-storey canted bay windows, and in the attic are three gabled dormers.	II
Central Hall and Promenade, Pavilion Gardens; 53.25814°N 1.91779°W		1869	The hall, which was designed by Edward Milner, is in millstone grit, cast iron and glass, with Welsh-slate roofs. It consists of a single-storey range of 15 bays, and a two-storey three-bay block to the west. The middle bay of the west block projects under a pediment, it has cast-iron columns with ornate capitals. At the top is a broad fascia, and in the centre of the roof is an octagonal cupola with eight round-headed windows and a two-stage octagonal spire. The east range has low stone walls, rusticated pilasters between the windows, and glazed roofs with ornate cast-iron ridge railings with crown finials.	II
The Conservatory, Pavilion Gardens; 53.25834°N 1.91685°W		1870–71	The conservatory, which was designed by Edward Milner, was extended in 1903, is in glass and cast iron with a Welsh-slate roof. There is a single storey and ranges of seven and ten bays, with low walls, cast-iron columns, an ornate iron parapet with crown finials, and hipped roofs. The north entrance, which was added later, is in stone, and has four Tuscan Doric columns carrying an entablature, and round-headed windows, and on the roof are elongated glass domes.	II
The Octagonal, Pavilion Gardens; 53.25799°N 1.91865°W		1875	A concert hall designed by Robert Rippon Duke, it has a stone foundation on which is a structure in glass, cast iron and timber, topped by ornate iron railings, and with a slate roof. It has a single storey and an octagonal plan, with two gabled entrance fronts. These fronts have seven windows divided by cast-iron columns with moulded bases and capitals. The roof has eight shallow hipped roofs, and a central octagonal dome with a dormer window in each face. The dormers are Venetian windows and have urns and a central iron finial, and the dome is surmounted by an iron crown.	II
4 Cavendish Circus; 53.25968°N 1.91442°W		Late 19th century	A pharmacy in gritstone containing an original recessed shopfront with pilasters, a fascia board, and a curved parapet. The central doorway has a pediment, and is flanked by canted shop windows, with inscription panels below and glazed panels above. Over these is a continuous seven-light window, and inside the shop the original fittings have been retained.	II
Bridge, Pavilion Gardens; 53.25780°N 1.91720°W		Late 19th century	The bridge, crossing the River Wye in the Pavilion Gardens, is in cast iron on stone piers, and consists of a central segmental arch and two smaller side arches. At each end, between the arches, are four piers with moulded cornices. The arches have trellised spandrels and a balustrade.	II
Six bollards, St John the Baptist's Church; 53.25914°N 1.91683°W		Late 19th century	The bollards are in cast iron. Each bollard is circular and tapering, with three tiers of paired horizontal bands and a shaped baluster top.	II
Claremont; 53.25852°N 1.91883°W		1876	A house, later flats, in millstone grit with a mansard roof in Welsh slate. There are two storeys and an attic, and a symmetrical front of three bays. The central doorway is flanked by Corinthian columns, and has a fanlight, and a dated hood with a curved top, and above it is a sash window with a moulded surround, a sill on brackets, and a segmental pediment. These are flanked by two-storey canted bay windows, and in the roof are three segmental-headed dormers.	II
10–28 Spring Gardens; 53.25892°N 1.91226°W		c. 1878	A terrace of six shops with residential accommodation above, in millstone grit with sandstone dressings and a Welsh-slate roof. There are three storeys, basements and attics, and each shop has three bays. In the ground floor, most of the shops have modern fronts flanked by channelled pilasters. The middle floor contains a tripartite window with a pedimented entablature on consoles with sash windows, and a ledge with cast-iron railings. In the top floor are sash windows in architraves, with ledges and iron railings, and the attics have two pedimented dormers.	II
Samuel Turner Memorial Drinking Fountain; 53.25900°N 1.91346°W		1878	The drinking fountain is in stone, and has an octagonal base of four steps, with the square fountain above. On each face is a moulded animal bowl with a rusticated round arch, a keystone, and flanking pilasters. Above it is a moulded round arch between Ionic pilasters surmounted by a segmental pediment, with a marble bowl fed by water from a carved lion's head. On the top is a dome and an ornate cast-iron standard and a large octagonal lantern. There are inscriptions on the sides of the fountain. It was designed by Robert Rippon Duke.	II
Drinking well, Devonshire Royal Hospital; 53.25911°N 1.91577°W		1882	The building contained a drinking well and pump room for the hospital. It is in gritstone on a plinth, with quoins, and a Welsh-slate roof with louvred vents. There is a single storey, and a south front of a single bay with an open pedimented gable. It contains a round-headed doorway with double doors, a large fanlight, and a moulded inner arch. The outer arch has an impost band and an inscription. The west front has three bays, the middle bay projecting under an open pedimented gable containing a round-arched window, an impost band, and an inscription in the arch. The outer bays contain sash windows.	II
The Old Club House; 53.25874°N 1.91667°W		1886	William Radford Bryden designed the Union Club (now the Old Clubhouse pub) on Water Street in 1886, as a gentleman's club for guests to the spa town. The building is in millstone grit on a chamfered plinth, with bands, moulded eaves, and a Lakeland slate roof with ornate terracotta ridge tiles and a louvred vent. There are two storeys and seven bays. Near the centre is a projecting wing with a coped gable, kneelers and a cross finial, containing a doorway with a fanlight and to the left a cross casement window, both with segmental heads and Tudor hood moulds. On the right is a two-storey canted bay window with an embattled parapet. Elsewhere, the windows are sashes.	II
Town Hall; 53.25694°N 1.91410°W		1887–89	The town hall is in millstone grit with a Welsh-slate roof and ornamental cast-iron cresting. There are two storeys, attics and a basement, and the north front is symmetrical with five bays. The front has rusticated pilasters, and a moulded entablature, above are paired Tuscan pilasters, a cornice, an entablature and a parapet. The middle bay projects slightly, and contains a round-arched doorway with a moulded surround, a carved keystone and ornate spandrels. The steps have walls with four ornate lamps, and the outer bays contain round-arched openings. Above the doorway is a Venetian window flanked by pairs of Corinthian columns, over which is a pediment, and at the top of the building is a panelled section with a parapet, urns, and tall truncated pyramidal roofs with iron railings. In the centre of the roof is a clock tower, surmounted by a cupola with eight Corinthian columns and a dome with a finial.	II
Former Paxton Suite and railings 53.25828°N 1.91795°W		1889	Originally called the Entertainment Stage (or the New Theatre), subsequently The Hippodrome cinema and The Playhouse theatre and now the Pavilion Arts Centre (the venue of Buxton Cinema). It was designed by William Radford Bryden for the Buxton Gardens Company in 1889. It is in millstone grit with quoins, a sill band, and a hipped Welsh-slate roof with a louvred vent. There is a single storey and a basement, a front of six bays, a two-storey two-bay wing to the right, and further to the right is a two-storey four-bay extension. The outer bays of the main block project and have ornate shaped gables containing oval panels with carving and keystones, and above are open pediments and pointed finials. The left bay contains a doorway with a moulded surround, side lights, a fanlight, and a segmental pediment. The similar doorway in the right bay has been converted into a window. The bays between are divided by rusticated pilasters; they contain windows with triangular pediments, and have a moulded entablature, and a parapet with ball and urn finials. The basement entrance is surrounded by iron railings.	II
Hogshaw Lane Viaduct; 53.25917°N 1.90707°W		c. 1890	The viaduct was built by the Midland Railway to carry its line over the valley of the River Wye. It is in millstone grit and limestone, with a brick interior to the arches, and consists of 16 arches of varying span, with one arch skewed. The arches have quoins, irregular piers, rusticated voussoirs and keystones, a raised band, and a coped parapet.	II
Longford Lodge; 53.25928°N 1.92339°W		1894	A house in millstone grit on a chamfered plinth with a Welsh-slate roof. There are two storeys and attics, and an irregular three-bay entrance front. In the centre is a porch and a doorway with a Tudor arch and a fanlight, over which is an overhanging roof with a latticed balustrade. The garden front has a projecting wing, and a canted and square bay window across the corner. Elsewhere, are sash and casement windows, cross windows, a two-storey square bay window, an oriel window, and gabled dormers.	II
Pump Room; 53.25872°N 1.91429°W		1894	The building designed by Henry Currey has been altered. It is in stone with a flat roof, a single storey, a T-shaped plan, and a front of seven bays. The middle five bays have Tuscan Doric pilasters, an inscribed entablature, and a balustrade. Each bay contains a moulded round arch containing a window or a doorway with a fanlight, moulded imposts, and a keystone. The outer bays project as rusticated pavilions with pediments. The rear has a curved wall with a moulded parapet and casement windows.	II
Seven Ways and Somersby; 53.25272°N 1.91941°W		1896	A pair of semi-detached houses designed by Barry Parker and Raymond Unwin. They have two storeys and attics, the ground floor is in millstone grit on a chamfered plinth, the upper part is timber framed, and the roof is tiled. On the front are five irregular bays, the outer bays gabled. Features include jettied upper storeys and gables, doorways with Tudor arched heads, a balcony with balusters, mullioned windows, a canted bay window, and jettied oriel windows.	II
Green Moor; 53.26144°N 1.92652°W	—	1897–98	The house, which is in Vernacular Revival style, has a ground floor in millstone grit, the upper floor is rendered with applied timber framing, the attic is tile-hung, and the roof is tiled, with a coped gable and kneelers. There are two storeys, an attic and a basement, and an L-shaped plan, including canted corners containing windows. The windows vary; some are mullioned, and there are canted bay windows, oriel windows, and dormers. In an angle is a two-storey porch, and on the east front is a balcony.	II
The Opera House; 53.25850°N 1.91676°W		1901–03	The opera house was designed by Frank Matcham, and is in gritstone with pilasters, and Welsh-slate roofs. There are two storeys and attics, and a symmetrical entrance front of five bays. The central entrance is flanked by fluted and banded Doric columns, the adjacent bays have round-headed doorways, and in the outer bays are canted doorways. Over the middle three bays is an ornate canopy in iron and glass, and above this is a large round arch with a moulded surround, a keystone and a balustrade. Surmounting this is a ramped inscribed parapet with a coat of arms above, flanked by balustrades with urn finials. The outer bays form round towers with an entablature, a ramped parapet with pedimented finials, and a ribbed lead dome with a ball finial.	II*
Cavanaleck and Overlaw; 53.26775°N 1.91707°W		1903–04	A pair of houses in gritstone, with tile roofs and overhanging eaves with moulded bargeboards. There are two storeys, attics and basements, and an irregular front of four bays with two gables. On the left corner is a canted bay window, between the gables is a raking dormer, and most of the other windows are mullioned and contain casements. Designed by Parker and Unwin.	II
Lightwood Ridge and Woodlea; 53.26792°N 1.91738°W		1903–04	A pair of houses in gritstone, with tile roofs and overhanging eaves with moulded bargeboards. There are two storeys, attics and basements, and an irregular front of four bays with two gables. On the left corner is a small triangular bay window, and a window wrapping round the corner. Between the gables is a raking dormer, and most of the other windows are mullioned and contain casements. Designed by Parker and Unwin.	II
1–4 Milnthorp Homes; 53.25416°N 1.92485°W		1904	A row of four stone almshouses (designed by William Radford Bryden) on a chamfered plinth, with quoins, a tile roof, terracotta ridge tiles, and coped gables with kneelers, quatrefoils, panels, and ball finials. The inner houses are paired with round gables, and the gables of the outer houses are straight. The doorways are recessed under segmental arches between the inner and outer houses, and each house has a square bay window with sashes.	II
5–8 Milnthorp Homes; 53.25424°N 1.92518°W		1904	A row of four stone almshouses (designed by William Radford Bryden) on a chamfered plinth, with quoins, a tile roof, terracotta ridge tiles, and coped gables with kneelers. The inner houses are paired under a large Dutch gable containing a segment-headed panel with keystone, an inscription, and the date. The outer houses have straight gables with quatrefoils and square panels. The doorways are recessed under segmental arches between the inner and outer houses, and each house has a square bay window with sashes.	II
9–12 Milnthorp Homes; 53.25422°N 1.92556°W		1904	A row of four stone almshouses (designed by William Radford Bryden) on a chamfered plinth, with quoins, a tile roof, terracotta ridge tiles, and coped gables with kneelers, quatrefoils, panels, and ball finials. The inner houses are paired with round gables, and the gables of the outer houses are straight. The doorways are recessed under segmental arches between the inner and outer houses, and each house has a square bay window with sashes.	II
Walls and gates, Milnthorp Homes; 53.25396°N 1.92531°W		1904	The walls enclosing the grounds are in stone with chamfered coping, and are 140 metres (460 ft) long. They contain two sets of gates and 16 intermediate piers. The gate piers are square, and have moulded tops, and concave pyramidal caps with ball finials.	II
Building southeast of Devonshire Royal Hospital; 53.25976°N 1.91626°W		1914	Built as a bath house and later used for other purposes, the building is in gritstone, it has a parapet with an iron balustrade, and a glazed and lead roof, and is in Baroque style. There is a single storey and a symmetrical front of eleven bays. In the centre is a projecting porch with a rusticated round arch, and a broken segmental pediment. The flanking bays contain casement windows with moulded surrounds and keystones, and the outer bays project slightly, and have triangular pediments. On the central and outer bays are urn finials.	II
St Mary's Church; 53.25359°N 1.91297°W		1914–15	The church is in gritstone with a Welsh-slate roof and eyebrow dormers, and is in Arts and Crafts style. It consists of a nave, north and south aisles, north and south porches, north and south transepts, and a chancel with north and south vestries. Over the crossing is a small square louvred bell lantern with a pyramidal hipped roof. Most of the windows are lancets.	II
Tombstone of Micah Salt; 53.24523°N 1.90029°W		1915	The tombstone in Buxton Cemetery is to the memory of the archaeologist Micah Salt. It is in gritstone, and consists of a square base and a tapering shaft with a Celtic cross. Its decoration is complex and well organised, and includes interlace carving, and two figurative scenes depicting the Virgin and Christ, and an angel with trumpet. On the head of the cross are carvings of angels in panels. It is surrounded by an inscribed shaped marble kerbstone. The tombstone is a copy of a 9th-century cross in Eyam.	II
War Memorial, The Slopes; 53.25824°N 1.91374°W		1920	The war memorial, designed by L. F. Roslyn, consists of a tall stone obelisk with a laurel band and a pyramidal top. This stands on a two-stepped square base with a curved front, and a rectangular plinth. In front of the obelisk is a bronze statue depicting a winged angel holding a sword and a laurel wreath. On the front of the plinth is a bronze inscription.	II
War memorial, St Mary's Church; 53.25360°N 1.91335°W		1920s	The war memorial in the churchyard is in limestone on a base and plinth of reinforced concrete and stone. It consists of a crucifix with a canopy on a tapering chamfered square pillar on a chamfered plinth. There are inscriptions on the plinth.	II
War Memorial, Harpur Hill; 53.23675°N 1.90578°W		1928	The war memorial is in limestone, and consists of a base of small boulders supporting a massive boulder. On the massive boulder is a bronze plaque in the form of a laurel wreath with an inscription and the names of those lost in the First World War.	II
St Ann's Well; 53.25859°N 1.91451°W		c. 1940	The well, on the site of earlier wells, is in gritstone with a rectangular base, a moulded plinth, a tall central pier, flanking lower recessed piers, and convex coping at the top. The shaped centre panel contains a round-headed niche with mosaic inlay, and two bronze figures, above which is an inscription. The bronze statue of St Ann and child is by the English sculptor Herbert William Palliser. Below is a bronze lion's head spout and a rectangular marble trough on a pedestal.	II

== See also ==
- Lost buildings of Buxton
- Pubs and inns in Buxton
