= Pavilion Arts Centre, Buxton =

Listed building in Derbyshire, England

Pavilion Arts Centre
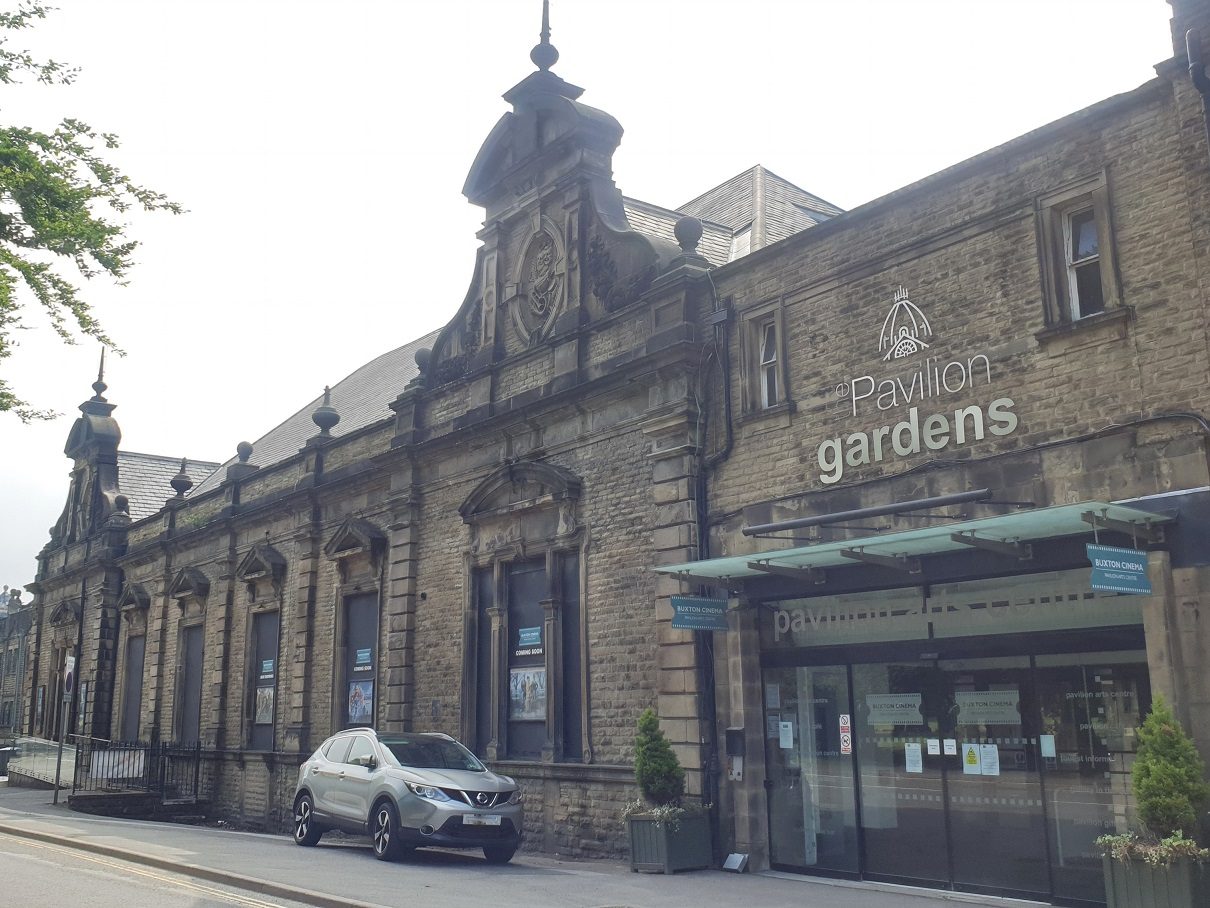
- Buxton Cinema at the Pavilion Arts Centre
- Former names: Entertainment Stage 1899-1903, Hippodrome 1903-1932, Playhouse 1932-1978, Paxton Suite 1979-2010

General information
- Town or city: Buxton, Derbyshire
- Country: England
- Coordinates: 53.2585°N 1.9184°W
- Completed: 1889

Design and construction
- Architect(s): William Bryden
- Designations

Listed Building – Grade II
- Official name: Paxton Suite and Attached Railings
- Designated: 4 October 1988
- Reference no.: 1257991

The Pavilion Arts Centre was opened in 1889 as the new Entertainment Stage theatre on St John's Road in Buxton, Derbyshire, England. It is part of the Pavilion Gardens complex of buildings in the town's central Conservation Area. It has a main 360-seat theatre, and since 2017 it has been the home of Buxton Cinema.

== Background ==
The Pavilion Arts Centre is Buxton's second theatre, located behind the Buxton Opera House which is the town's principal theatre venue with 900 seats. The two theatres share a programme of events staged by the same organisation. In 2010 the Paxton Suite was redeveloped and opened as the Pavilion Arts Centre with a smaller Studio Theatre as well as the main theatre. The centre is one of the main venues for the annual Buxton Festival and for the town's Fringe Festival.

It is the oldest surviving theatre in Buxton. The earliest theatre in Buxton was in a thatched house on Spring Gardens, which staged performances from c.1784 to c.1829 at the foot of Hardwick Street (replaced by Milligan's Drapery and Milliner's shop and where the Argos store is now). From 1830 to 1854 the theatre moved to the end of the Broad Walk, in the old hall stables opposite the Old Hall Hotel at the foot of Hall Bank. In 1833 the world-famous violinist Niccolo Paganini performed there. After this theatre was demolished in 1854, performances were held variously at the Assembly Room, the Courthouse and the Independent Chapel. In 1889 the Entertainment Stage was opened by actor John Toole. It was also known as the New Theatre. When the Buxton Opera House theatre was opened in 1903, the New Theatre was modified to show silent movies and changed its name to the Hippodrome. In 1932 it reverted to a performance theatre and became The Playhouse. An annual festival ran from 1937 to 1942, in conjunction with Lilian Baylis's theatre company from London's Old Vic Theatre, with plays at the Opera House and a summer school at The Playhouse theatre. The Playhouse had its own resident repertory company, which included Nigel Hawthorne.

The theatre closed in November 1945 and re-opened in June 1946 with a production of Quality Street in which Peter Wyngarde made the first appearance of his professionsl career, as Ensign Blades. Soon after that, it presented J. B. Priestley's When We Are Married.

The Literary and Dramatic Societies of two local schools, Buxton College and Cavendish Grammar School, staged annual performances of Shakespeare plays, such as Hamlet (1966), Coriolanus (1968) and Macbeth (1970), or else modern works, such as Bertold Brecht's Life of Galileo (1967) and Dylan Thomas's The Doctor and the Devils (1969). In 1979 it was renamed again as The Paxton Suite.

The Pavilion Arts Centre is a Grade-II listed building. It was designed for the Buxton Gardens Company by local architect William Radford Bryden and was built of millstone grit stone by James Salt. The large shaped gables feature theatrical masks of comedy and tragedy. Bryden also designed the nearby Old Clubhouse (originally the Union Club), Solomon's Temple and the remodelling of the Thermal Baths in the 1880s.

When Buxton Cinema opened in 2017, it marked the end of three decades for the town without a cinema and a return to the original cinema venue in the town. Buxton's first cinema was The Hippodrome in 1903. The Picture House was then built in 1916 on Spring Gardens (on the site of the demolished Victoria Arcade and Swedish Gymnasium). Buxton Opera House opened in 1903 and it was converted to a cinema in 1927 which closed in 1976. In 1937 The Picture House was remodelled as the art deco Spa Cinema, running until its closure in the 1960s. It was then used as a bingo hall but reopened as a cinema in 1976 after the Opera House cinema had closed. It was closed in 1986 and demolished in 1987. The Job Centre building and a supermarket now stand on the site.

== See also ==
- Listed buildings in Buxton
