= William Radford Bryden =

British architect

William Radford Bryden FSA FRIBA (1851 – 16 February 1941) was an English architect and surveyor who designed various prominent Victorian buildings in Buxton, Derbyshire.

== Life ==
Bryden was born in Eccles, Lancashire in 1851. His parents were William Anderson and Maria Bryden.

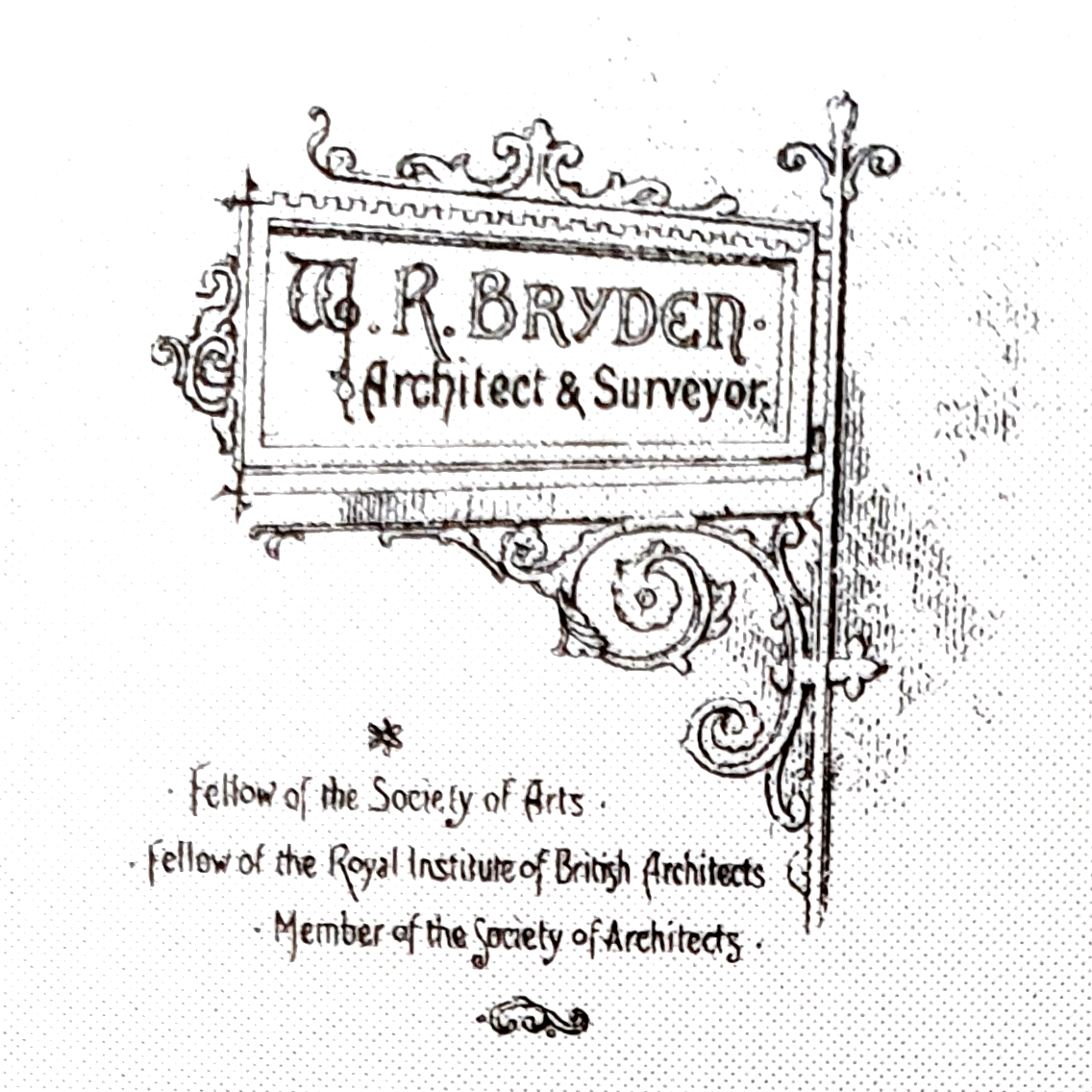
Letterhead of W R Bryden 1896

He attended Cheltenham College (in Newick House) from 1865 to 1868. His two younger brothers Charles (born 1852) and Henry (born 1854) were also at Cheltenham at the same time and both went on to play rugby union for England.

Bryden was an articled architect with Edward Middleton Barry RA and trained under Robert William Edis RSA and William Henry Crossland. He became an Associate of the Royal Institute of British Architects (RIBA) in 1876. In 1877 he established the architect and surveyor practice of "Bedborough and Bryden" at Bideford and Westward Ho in Devon. Bryden announced in the London Gazette in 1878 that he had dissolved his partnership with Alfred Bedborough.

He married Emily Somes Crichton in 1878. They had children Archibald Leslie Bryden and Jessie Margaret Bryden. Emily died aged 27 in 1882. William Bryden married Alice Ryde Sawer in 1884 and their children Arthur Thomas Bryden, Alice Dorothea Bryden and Florence Marion Bryden were born in Buxton.

W. R. Bryden came to Buxton from Bideford in 1883. He bought Robert Rippon Duke's architect's business on George Street in 1883, when R. R. Duke retired. He became renowned for his eclectic style with shaped gables, towers, pinnacles, crenellations and mixed window styles. Bryden trained George Edward Garlick (c. 1863 – c. 1932) and William Holland (b. 1861) who both set up their own successful architect practices on Terrace Road in Buxton. Charles Swain of Manchester bought Bryden's architect business on George Street in 1921.

In 1886 Bryden won the first championship tournament of the new Buxton and High Peak Golf Club. Bryden designed his own homes Lakenham on Burlington Road in 1898 and Heathfield on Park Road in 1905. He died aged 89 in 1941 at Bexhill-on-Sea in Sussex.

== Works ==
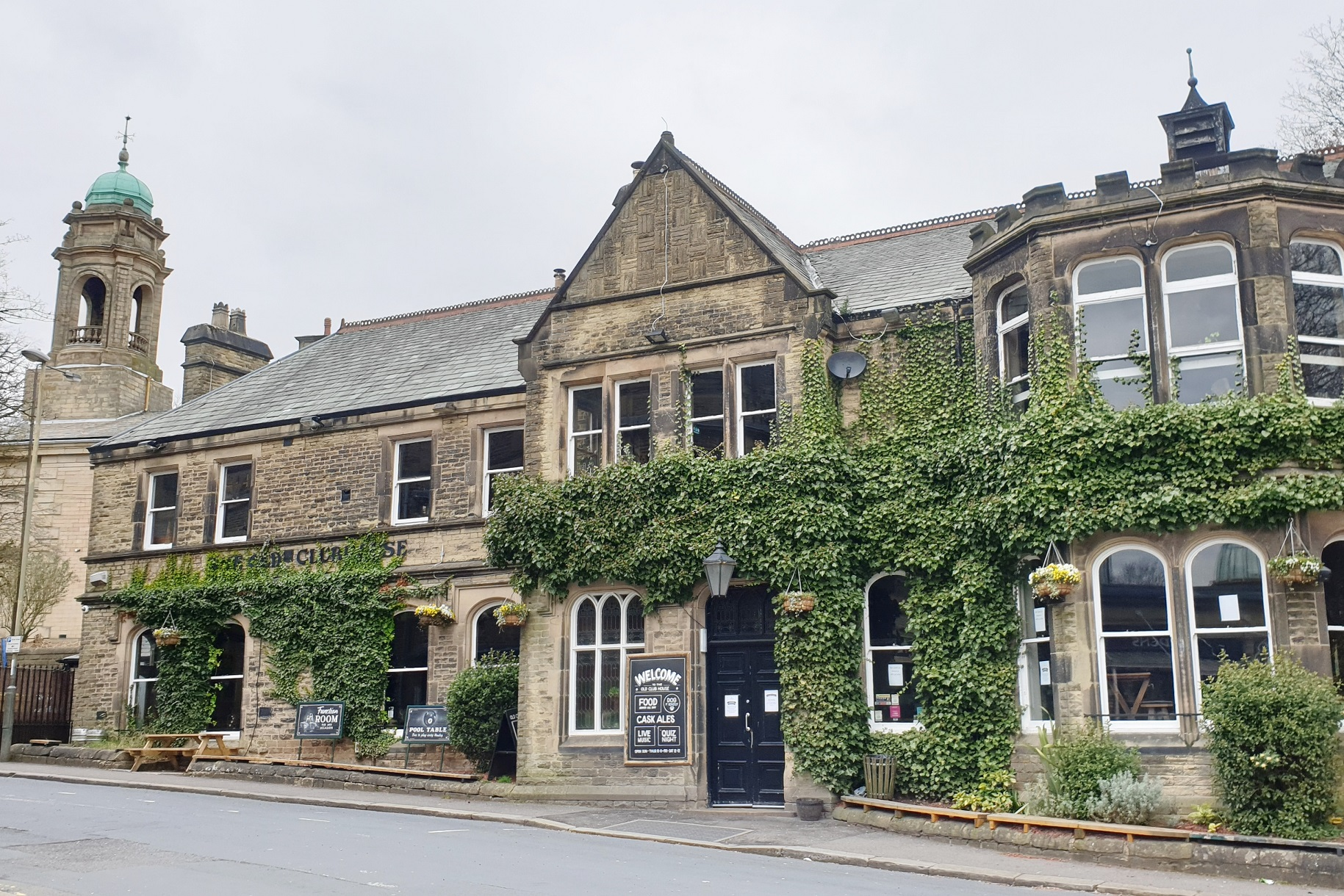
The Old Clubhouse

W. R. Bryden, John Carr, Joseph Paxton, Henry Currey and Robert Rippon Duke were all architects appointed by the Dukes of Devonshire. The distinguished Georgian and Victorian buildings of Buxton were largely designed by these few architects.

Bryden designed the Union Club (now the Old Clubhouse pub) on Water Street in 1886 as a gentleman's club for guests to the spa town. It is a Grade II listed building. In 1887 he designed a ballroom for the Buxton Hydropathic hotel on Hartington Road (demolished in 1973).

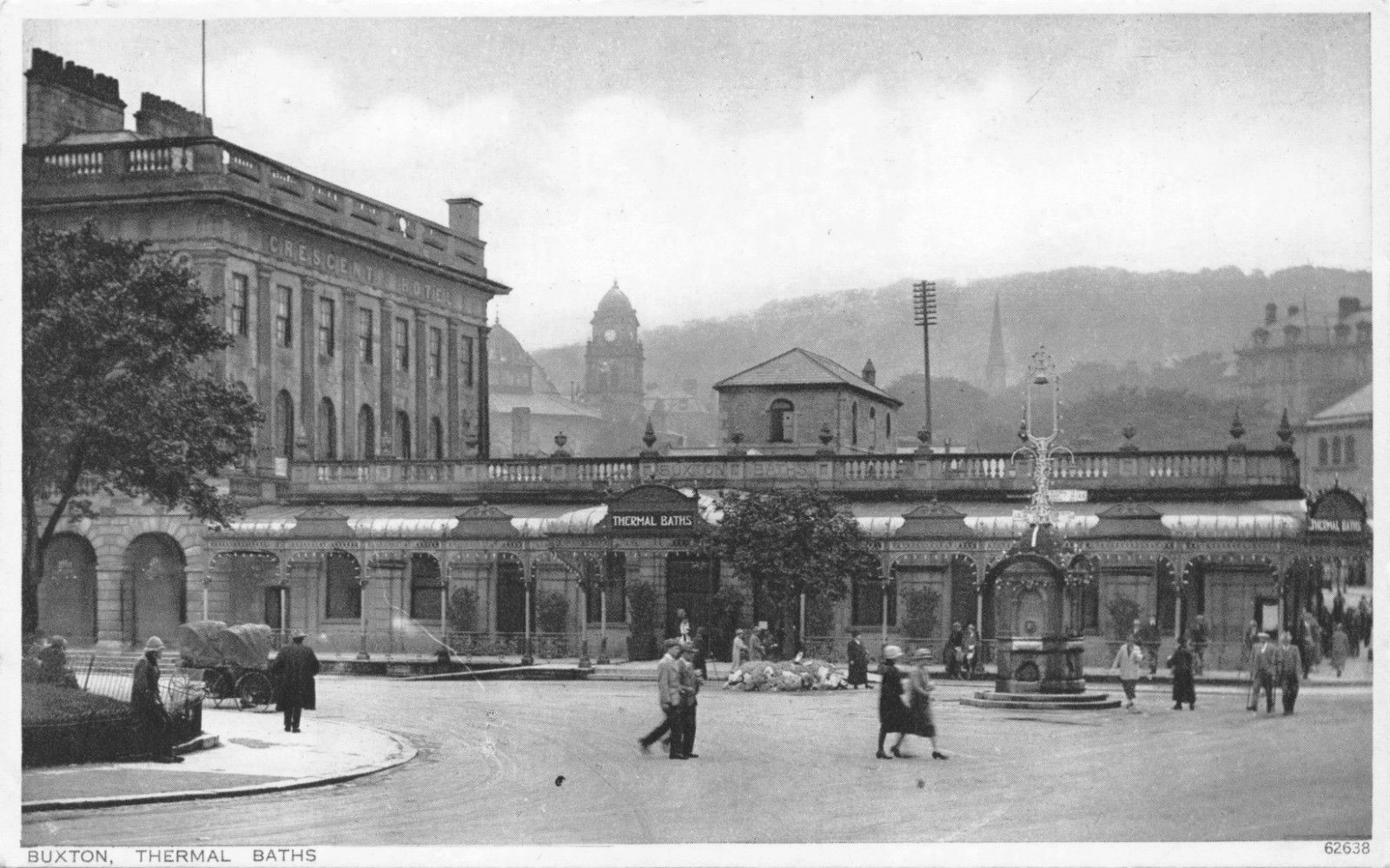
Thermal Baths in early 20th-century

Bryden also remodelled Buxton's Thermal Baths in the 1880s, with a new water tower, a waiting room, shops and a new ashlar gritstone facade replacing the glass and iron colonnades.

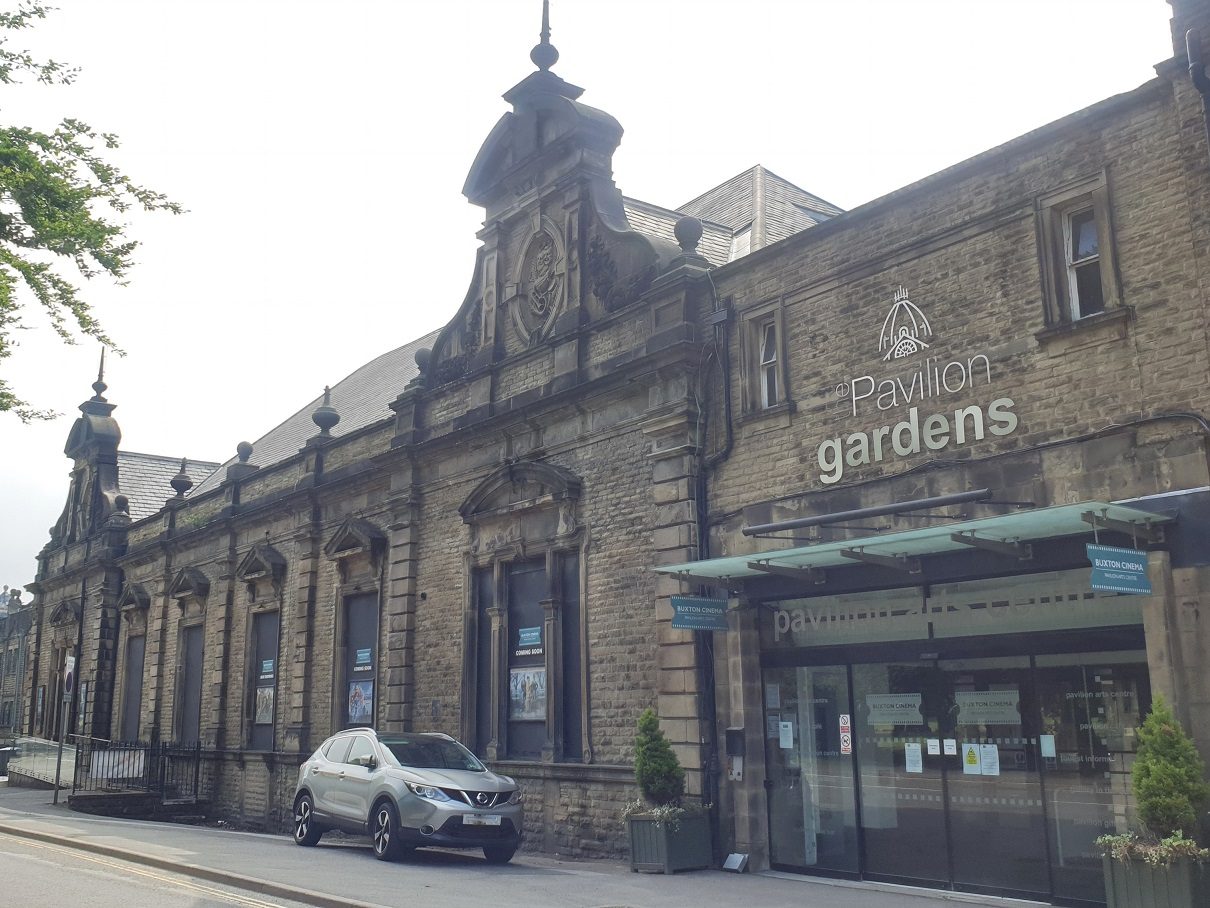
The Pavilion Arts Centre

The Entertainment Stage (also known as the New Theatre) on St John's Road was designed by Bryden for the Buxton Gardens Company in 1889. It was built of millstone grit stone by local builder James Salt. The large shaped gables feature theatrical masks of comedy and tragedy. When the Buxton Opera House theatre was opened in 1903, the New Theatre was modified to show silent movies and changed its name to the Hippodrome. In 1932 it reverted to a performance theatre and became The Playhouse. In 1979 it was renamed again as The Paxton Suite. Now known as The Pavilion Arts Centre it incorporates Buxton Cinema. It is a Grade-II listed building.

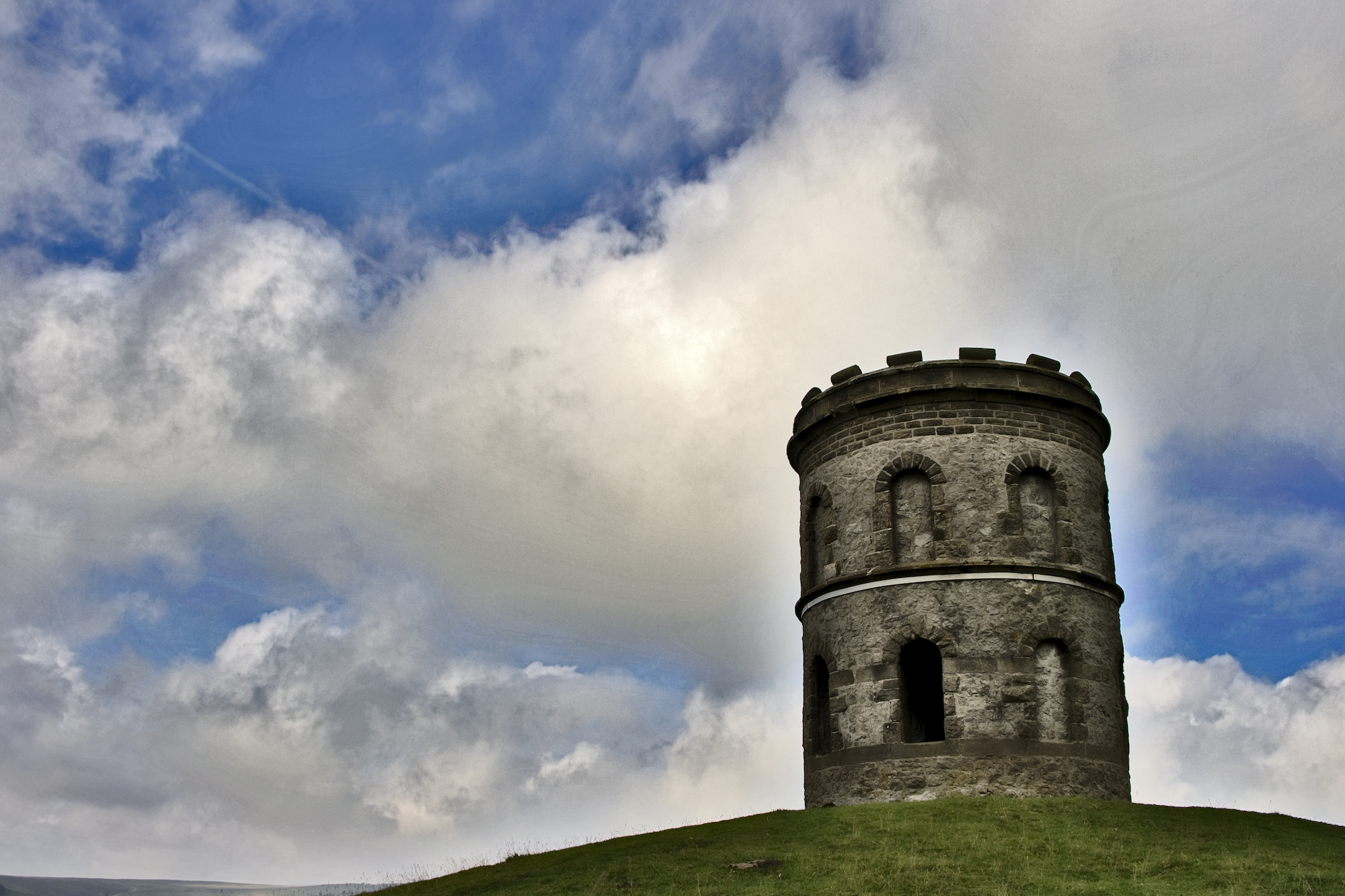
Solomon's Temple

Bryden and his student George Edwin Garlick designed Grinlow Tower (now called Solomon's Temple) in 1894 on Grin Low hill. It is a Grade II listed building.

In 1890 Bryden designed a manse for the Unitarian Chapel on Hartington Road. In 1895 Bryden designed a new parsonage on Lismore Road. In 1895 Bryden also designed the restored nave of Saint Michael's Church at Beguildy in Wales. The Catholic Apostolic Church (also known as The Gospel Hall) on the corner of Hardwick Square South and Darwin Avenue was designed by Bryden in 1896. In 1901 he was the architect for the rebuilding of the Grade II listed St Paul's Church in Flash, Staffordshire (5 miles south of Buxton). Bryden also designed Alison Park Hotel on Temple Road in 1904.

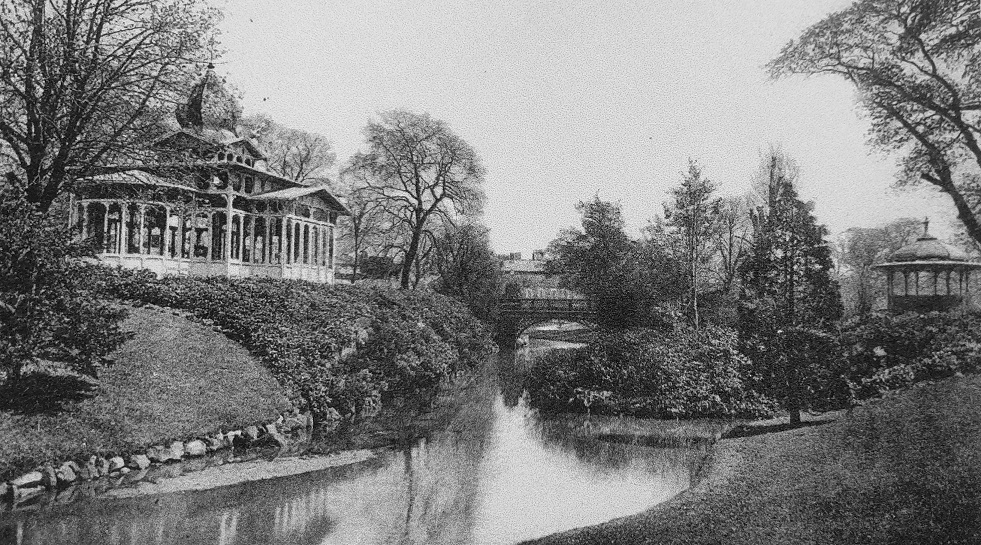
Oriental Tea Kiosk

The Oriental Tea Kiosk in Buxton Pavilion Gardens was designed by Bryden and built in 1899. It was used in the 1960s as an amusement arcade and demolished in 1977.

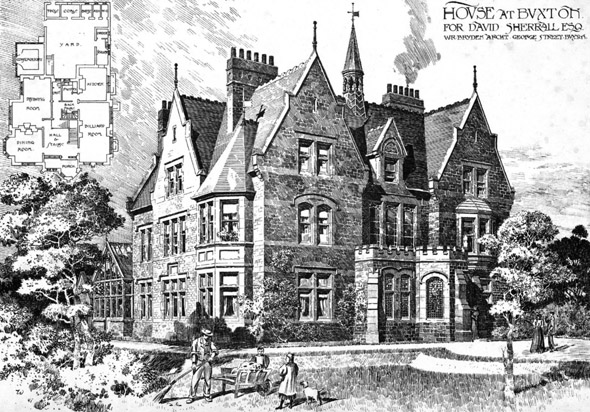
Design for The Hawthorns in 1896

Bryden also designed many residential buildings around Buxton (mostly for wealthy clients) including: Marlborough Mansions on Marlborough Road (in 1891); 12 Park Road; The Hawthorns on Burlington Road (in 1891, now a Salvation Army care home); Lakenham, Inglethorpe, Glenbrook, Elmwood and Elmbank villas on Burlington Road (in 1898); Branksome's Coachman's Lodge on Gadley Lane (in 1902); Milnthorpe Homes almshouses for the elderly on Macclesfield Road (in 1905); Lerryn, Heatherton and Brooklands villas on Temple Road (between 1908 and 1910); Parkfield villa on Carlisle Road (in 1910, now demolished); Ravensworth on Carlisle Road (in 1912).

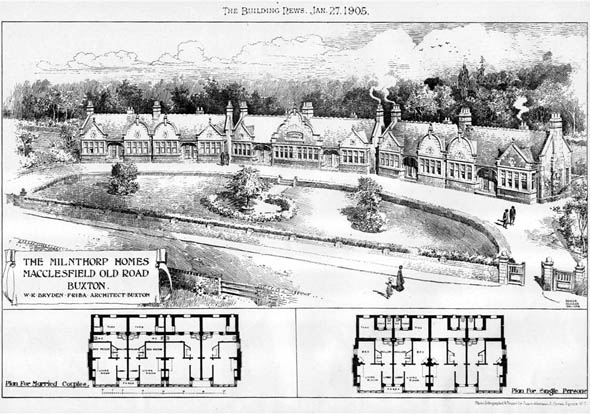
Design for Milnthorpe Homes in 1905

In 1899 Bryden designed the Grade II-listed George Woofindin almshouses on Eccleshall Road in Sheffield.
