= Bull ring =

Bull ring may refer to:

- Bullring, an arena in which bullfighting takes place
- Bull Ring, Birmingham, a city-centre area of Birmingham, England
- The Bull Ring, a henge in England
- Bull Ring, Wakefield, central point of the Wakefield town centre
- Bull Ring, Cirencester, the Roman amphitheatre of Corinium Dobunnorum
- "Bull ring", a name for training grounds for Allied troops in World War I near Étaples, France (see Étaples mutiny)
- Nose ring (animal), typically found on bulls
- Wanderers Stadium, in Johannesburg
