= Micah Salt =

British archaeologist

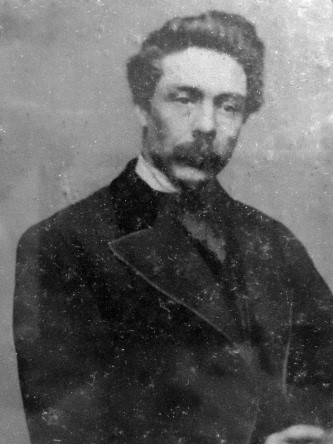
Micah Salt in 1876

Micah Salt (c. 1847 – 22 January 1915) was a tailor and amateur archaeologist from Buxton in Derbyshire.

== Life ==
Micah Salt was born in Alstonefield, Staffordshire in about 1847. He lived in Hollinsclough with his mother Eliza between 1851 and 1871. He married Maria Mellor in 1877. By 1881 he had moved to High Street in Buxton.

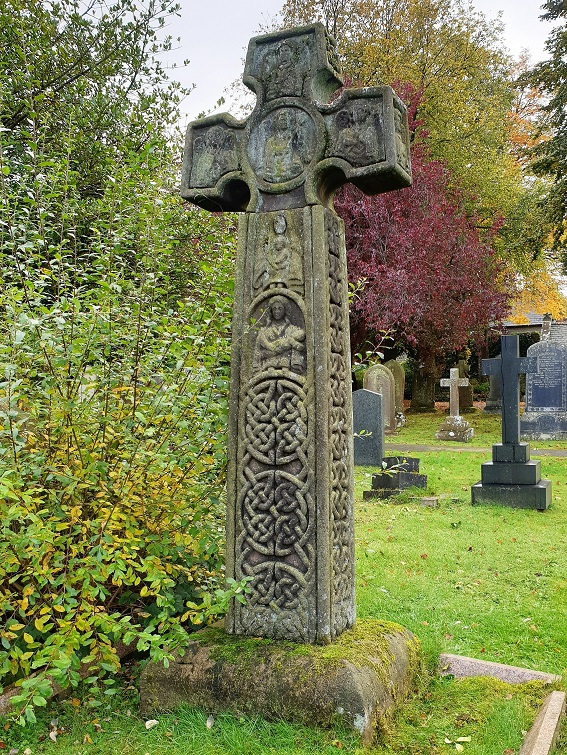
Micah Salt's tombstone at Buxton Cemetery

He died aged 67 in 1915. The gravestone of Micah Salt, and of his wife Maria (1857-1927), in Buxton Cemetery is a replica of the Anglo-Saxon cross in Eyam Cemetery. It is a Grade II listed structure.

Salt was a major donor to the Buxton Museum in its early days, providing numerous artefacts on loan, which were subsequently bestowed as gifts. His large personal collection of pottery, antique furniture and paintings was sold at auction over 3 days in 1927.

Micah's brother James Salt also came to Buxton and became a master builder. He operated from the Devonshire Works on Market Street and he built Buxton Town Hall, the Entertainment Stage theatre, Hollins Street and Clough Street.

== Excavations ==
Micah Salt, his son William and Robert Milletts (a local builder) excavated Thirst House Cave in Deep Dale in the 1880s and 1890s, after boys had found a bear's skull in the cave. They discovered Roman artefacts, including bronze jewellery, enamelled brooches, pottery fragments, coins and an iron and bone knife. Many of these objects are on display in the Buxton Museum.

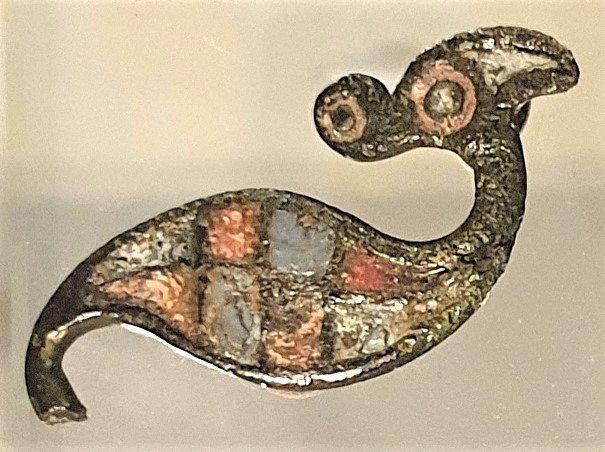
Enamel bronze brooch found in Thirst House Cave

A possible Roman bath was found in Buxton (the Roman spa settlement of Aquae Arnemetiae) in 1883 during the digging of the foundations for the Clarendon Hotel. Salt inspected the discovery but there are no records of his findings.

In 1894, Salt excavated the burial barrow at the summit of Grin Low hill, before Grinlow Tower (now known as Solomon's Temple) was rebuilt there between 1894 and 1896. He discovered the remains of three burials and two cremations, as well as a decorated bowl, a flint tool and other artefacts.

Salt also excavated Fairfield Low's Bronze Age burial mound in 1895. He discovered the remains of a human skeleton and the skull is now on the desk of the Boyd Dawkins study in Buxton Museum.

The Five Wells neolithic chambered tomb on Taddington Moor was first excavated by the local archaeologist Thomas Bateman in 1846. The chambers have paved floors. Bateman discovered the remains of at least twelve human skeletons. Subsequent excavations (by Llewellyn Jewitt, William Lukis and Micah Salt between 1862 and 1901) found further human remains, pottery and flint tools in the chambers and passages and a separate cist (stone coffin) within the mound.

Salt found a flint dagger at Hurdlow in 1899, which is now on display in Buxton Museum. In 1902, Salt dug a trench across the west ditch at The Bull Ring neolithic henge at Dove Holes, although his findings have since been lost.

In 1903, Salt discovered Romano-British remains in the basement of a house on Holker Road, in the Silverlands district of Buxton. He found an area of 30 feet by 10 feet paved with blocks of limestone and hundreds of artefacts including a silver coin, tiles, leather sandals, gritstone hearths, glassware and many fragments of fine Samian pottery. Pottery inscriptions indicate that they were made in 60-100 AD and from Verulamium (modern St Albans). Many of the items are on display in the Buxton Museum.

== Publications ==
- "Ancient Remains Near Buxton - Archaeological Explorations of Micah Salt" by William Turner FSS was published in 1899.
- "On Mr.Micah Salt’s diggings around Buxton" by John Ward FSA was published in The Journal of the British Archaeological Association in 1900.
