= Buxton Festival =

Annual arts festival in Buxton, England

Buxton International Festival
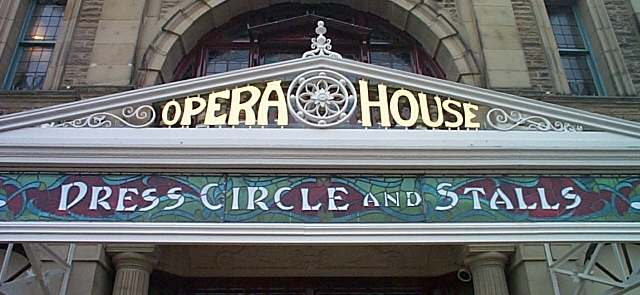
- Buxton Opera House
- Genre: arts festival
- Frequency: Annually
- Venue: Buxton Opera House
- Location: Buxton
- Country: United Kingdom
- Inaugurated: July 1979
- Founder: Malcolm Fraser, Anthony Hose, David Rigby
- Website: buxtonfestival.co.uk

The Buxton International Festival is an annual summer festival of opera, classical music, jazz and (since 2001) books, held in Buxton, Derbyshire, England. The festival was first held in the town's opera house in July 1979 and has continued every year, apart from 2020 when it was cancelled because of the Covid-19 crisis. The 2026 Buxton International Festival opened on 9 July, running until 26 July with a programme which included performances of six different operas.

== Origins of the present-day festival ==
The present annual festival was largely the inspiration of Malcolm Fraser (then lecturing in opera at the Royal Northern College of Music in Manchester) who visited Buxton on a day trip and saw the potential of the opera house to stage professional performances of rarely-staged operas. The decaying building, a classic Frank Matcham theatre which opened in 1903, was in need of a new use after closure in 1976. Fraser brought others to help including the conductor Anthony Hose (then Head of Music at Welsh National Opera) and David Rigby, who provided the business input. They spent three years planning the first Festival while the restoration was in progress.

The restored Buxton Opera House became the venue for the first Buxton Festival in 1979 with presentations of Lucia di Lammermoor (in its first complete performance in Britain), followed by Peter Maxwell Davies' The Two Fiddlers.

=== Current status ===
In 2026 the artistic director of the festival – now known as the Buxton International Festival to reflect its growing scope and scale – is Adrian Kelly and its chief executive is Michael Williams. Both were appointed in 2018.

Festival events take place in the opera house, the adjoining Pavilion Arts Centre and elsewhere in the town. Nearby St John's Church hosts many of the festival's classical music performances.

The books series was begun by the former Labour politician Roy Hattersley, who served as chair of the festival from 1999 to 2007. In 2026 authors appearing include Jimmy Wales, John Crace, Sir Nick Clegg and Julia Boyd.

=== Productions and performers ===
Productions have included rarely-performed operas (such as Britten's Let's Make an Opera (1980); Domenico Cimarosa's Il matrimonio segreto (1981 and 1993); Kodály's Háry János (in its British stage premiere in 1982); Vivaldi's Griselda (1983, but not seen anywhere since its original Venice presentation in 1735); Cherubini's Médée (1984, in its original French dialogue never seen in Britain); and, from 1986, many productions of Handel's operas, as well as many others by Cimarosa (in 1989 it presented three).

Performers have included Thomas Allen, Rosalind Plowright, Alan Opie, Nigel Kennedy, Cleo Laine, John Ogdon, Alan Bates, Dame Janet Baker, Victoria de los Ángeles, Margaret Price, Lesley Garrett and Sarah Brightman. The Northern Chamber Orchestra is among the orchestras to have performed at the festival.

The festival has often presented less well-known operas from celebrated composers, alongside a programme of classical concerts, jazz and a thriving Literary Series. In 2026 the programme included La traviata and The Merry Widow as well as less famous operas including Le dernier sorcier, La liberazione di Ruggiero, Amadigi di Gaula and concert performances of La clemenza di Tito. "Everyone knows there’s something in the water in Buxton. But at Buxton International Festival, there’s also magic in the air" said a review in the Times newspaper.

The festival has a policy of promoting performers near the start of their careers and in 2025 created its own orchestra featuring a mix of established professionals and outstanding young artists in their early careers.

The Festival presented its first Autumn Literary Weekend in 2014. This developed into The Big BIF Weekend in 2019 - a combination of opera, music and book events, which last took place in October 2021.

== Other festivals in Buxton ==
=== Buxton Festival Fringe ===
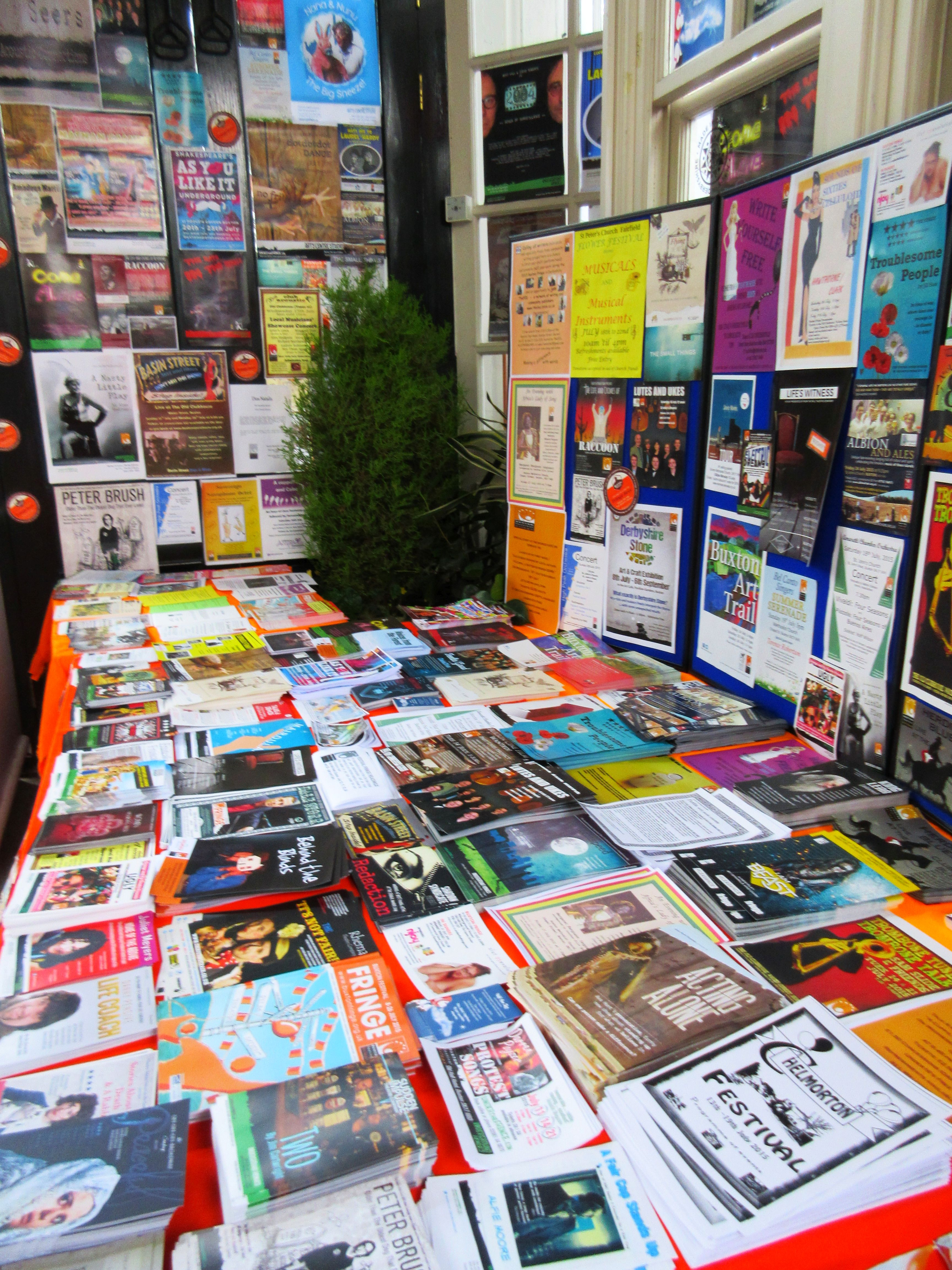
Poster and flyers at the Buxton Festival Fringe information desk, 2015.

The Buxton Festival Fringe is an annual open arts festival running at approximately the same time as the Buxton International Festival (3-21 July 2024). The festival hosts comedy, theatre, dance, music, street performances, film, performance art, talks and shows for children as well as other impromptu events. The festival celebrated its 40th Fringe in 2019 with 220 entries adding up to over 500 individual performances and making this the biggest Buxton Fringe to date. It is one of the largest fully independent Fringes in the United Kingdom, along with Brighton Festival Fringe and Edinburgh Fringe. The 2020 Fringe was mainly online with a few physical events. There were 101 events.

Since 2011, Underground Venues has been programming events at the newly refurbished Pavilion Arts Centre and Studio with Ed Reardon, Isy Suttie, Henning Wehn and Terry Christian being among the artists who have featured. A new managed venue, The Market Place, ran for a year in 2014 and 2017 saw the arrival of another new managed venue, The Rotunda. The Green Man Gallery in Buxton has also become a significant managed venue for the Fringe.

=== International Gilbert and Sullivan Festival ===
The Buxton International Festival is often followed by the International Gilbert & Sullivan Festival, which usually runs for two or three weeks in August each year in Buxton. It returned from Harrogate in 2023.

== Past festivals in Buxton ==
=== Drama festival ===
An ancestor of the current Festival dates to September 1937, when an annual drama festival was first held (running until 1942) in conjunction with the London-based Old Vic Theatre Company under Lilian Baylis. In addition to plays at the Buxton Opera House, this festival ran a summer school at the adjoining Playhouse Theatre.

=== Rock festival ===
On 26 September 1969 an all-night Blues Festival was held in the Buxton Pavilion Gardens. Fleetwood Mac and many other top bands performed. During the early 1970s, it was best known as one of the UK's most prominent rock festivals, with most major rock bands of the day appearing, including Mott The Hoople, The Faces, Lindisfarne, Canned Heat, Chuck Berry, Nazareth, Edgar Broughton Band, Groundhogs, Sensational Alex Harvey Band, Medicine Head, Brewers Droop, Roy Wood and Wizzard. During July 2007 it was the subject of several features on Jeff Cooper's 'Cooper Collection' show on 106.6 Smooth Radio.

== See also ==
- List of opera festivals
