= Grin Low =

Hill in the Derbyshire Peak District

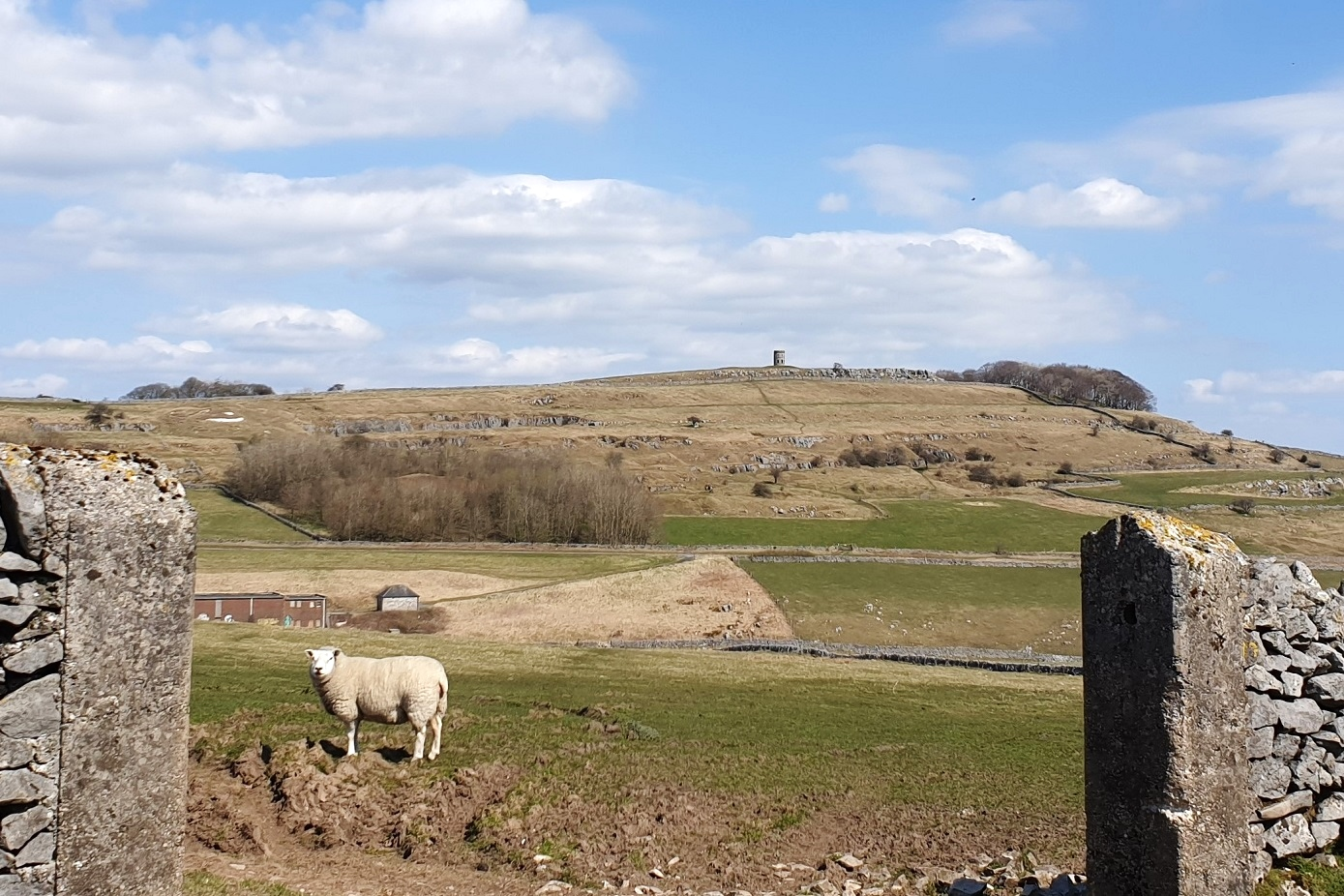
- View from the South

Highest point
- Elevation: 434 metres (1,424 ft)
- Coordinates: 53.245°N 1.9337°W

Geography
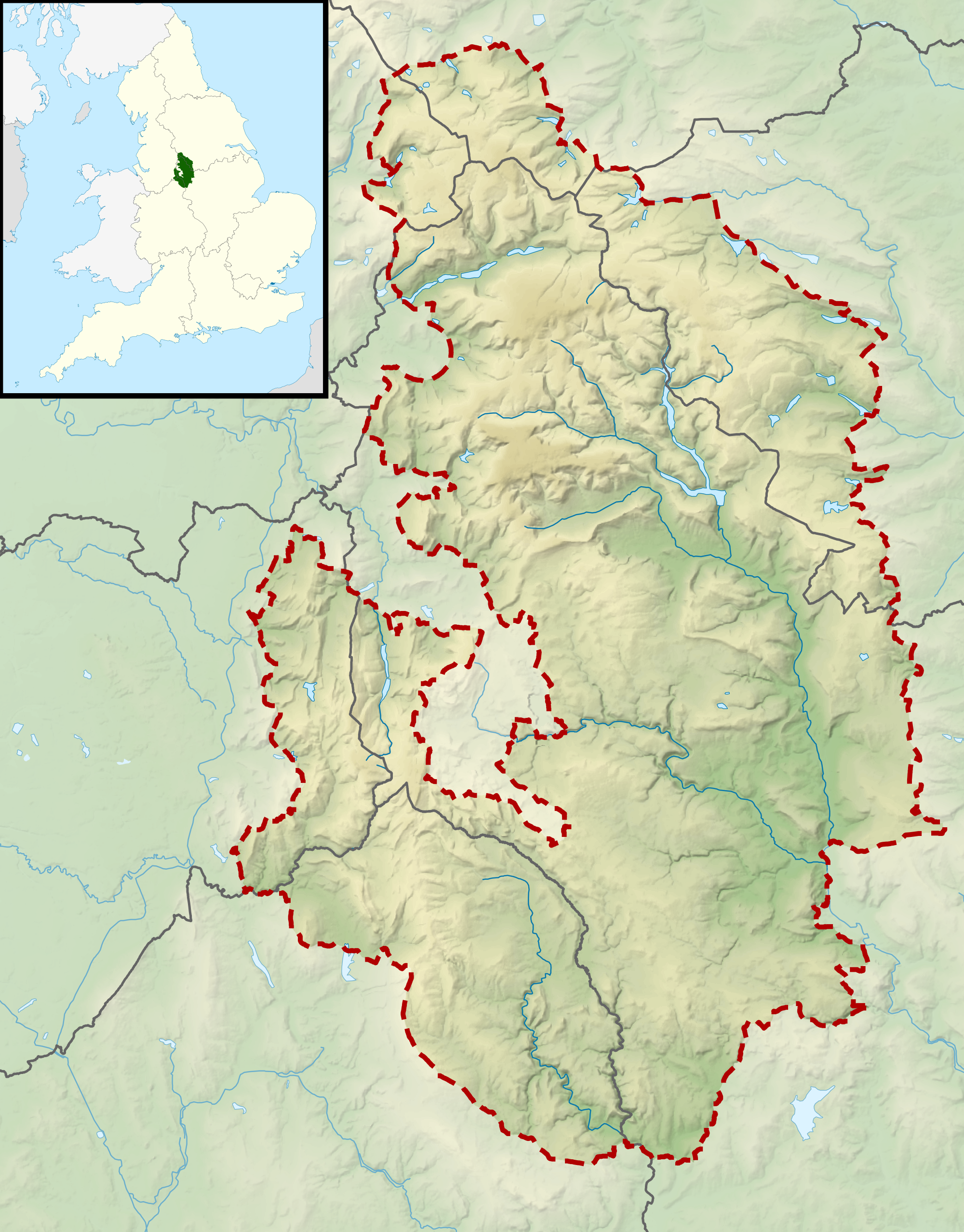
- Location within the Peak District Location within Derbyshire
- Location: Buxton, Derbyshire, England
- OS grid: SK054718
- Topo map: OS Explorer OL24

Grin Low is a hill overlooking Buxton in Derbyshire, in the Peak District. The summit is 434 metres (1,424 ft) above sea level.

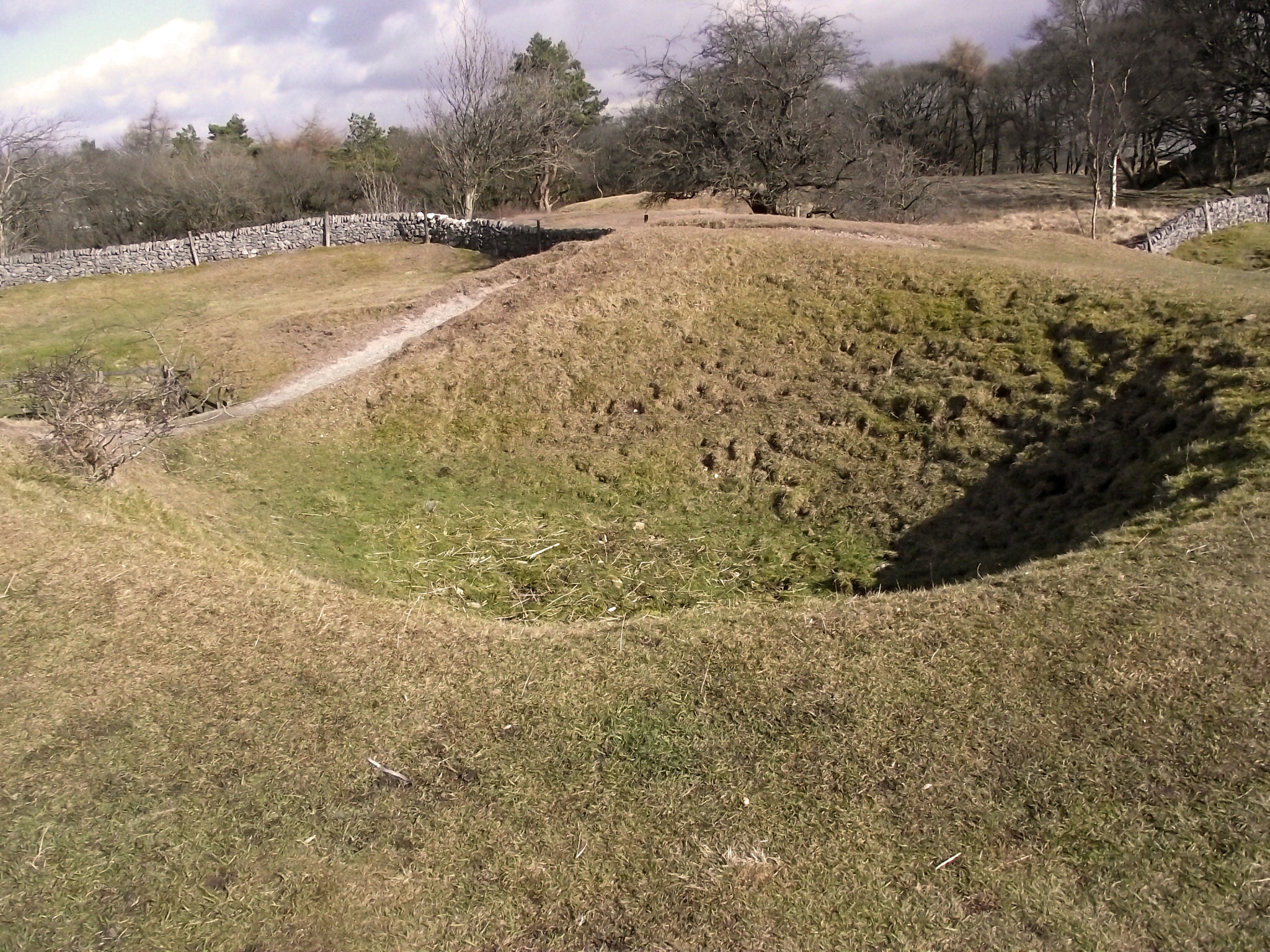
Remains of a lime kiln at Grin Low

Grin Low was the main location for the early Buxton lime industry. It was an extensive area of limestone quarrying and was licensed for lime burning from 1662 by the 1st Duke Of Devonshire. Demand for lime grew dramatically during the Industrial Revolution. There are widespread remains of over 100 large 'pudding' lime kilns, built of earth and rock, which date from the 17th–19th centuries. The land is also covered in spoil heaps of waste material. Coal came from local collieries at Axe Edge and Goyts Moss. In 1820 the 6th Duke of Devonshire commissioned the 'Grin Plantation' (now the wooded Buxton Country Park) to shield the scarred lime-burning landscape from visitors to the spa town of Buxton. The Cromford and High Peak Railway opened in 1831 and passed by Grin Low. The railway allowed the lime to be transported to canals and generated expansion of quarrying in Buxton. In the 1850s lime production at Grin Low moved to a new large quarry on the south side of the hill (which was operated until its closure in 1952). In 1890 Grin Low produced 90,000 tonnes of lime. The quarry is now a caravan park and campsite.

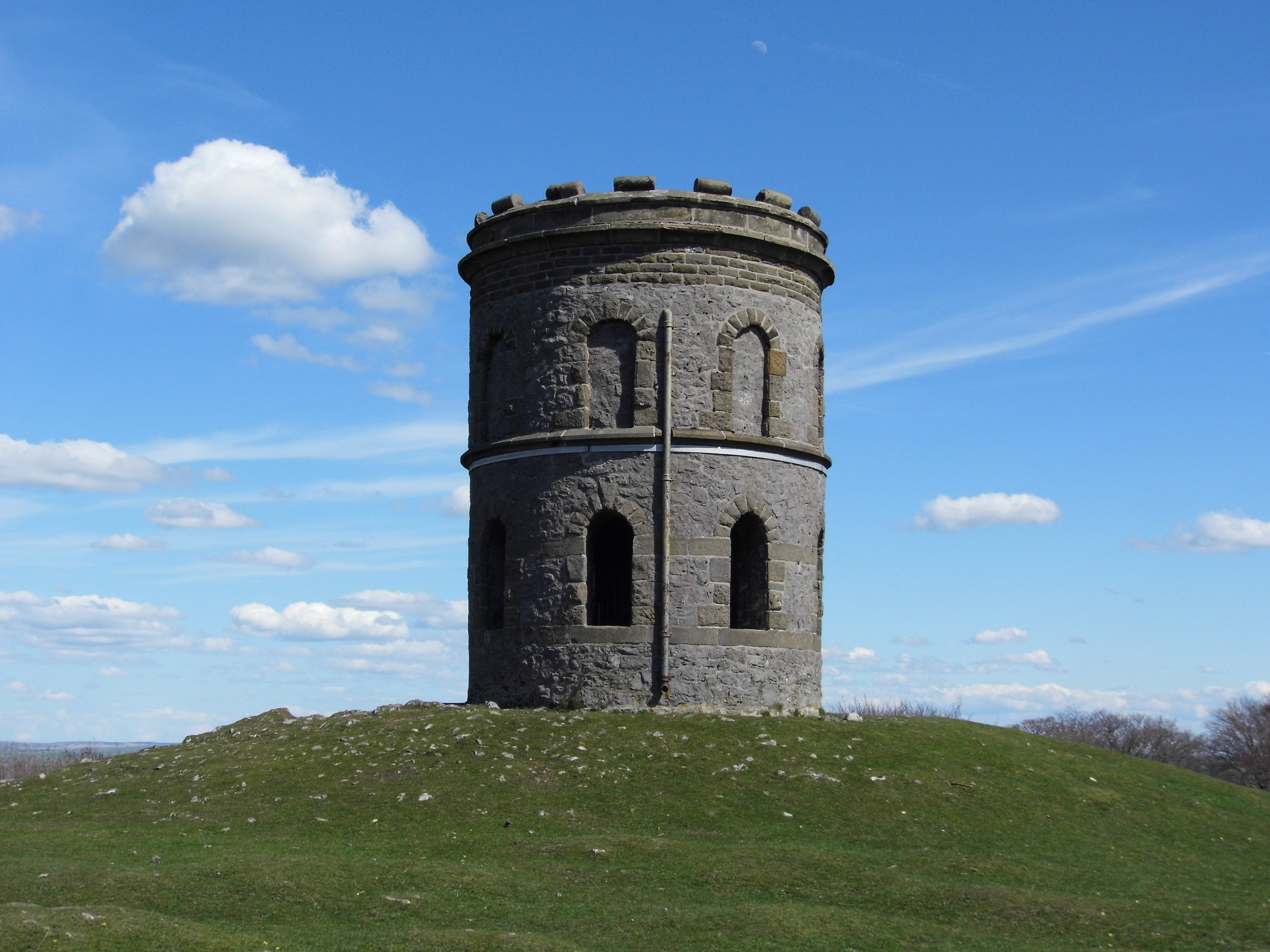
Grinlow Tower, known locally as Solomon's Temple

In the 1830s Solomon Mycock (proprietor of the Cheshire Cheese Inn) leased the land at the top of Grin Low. In 1840 he built Solomon's Temple (on behalf of the 6th Duke of Devonshire) at the summit, over an ancient burial mound, providing work to the unemployed of the town. By 1894 the structure of the folly had become dilapidated and the 8th Duke of Devonshire approved the replacement Grinlow Tower. The two-storey tower, 6 metres (20 ft) high, was designed by architects W. R. Bryden and George Garlick. The building was partly funded by public subscription. The new tower was opened by the Duke's cousin (and successor) Victor Cavendish in 1896. The tower was restored in 1987 with a partial contribution by Buxton residents. Grinlow Tower is a Grade II listed building. The structure is open with a spiral staircase inside to the viewing platform. There are panoramic views over Buxton to Mam Tor, Rushup Edge, Corbar Hill with Corbar Cross and in the opposite direction to Axe Edge. Temple Road in Buxton leads from the town to Grin Low.

In 1894, local archaeologist Micah Salt excavated the burial barrow at the summit of Grin Low hill, before the tower was rebuilt. He discovered the remains of three burials and two cremations, as well as a decorated bowl, a flint tool and other artefacts.

Buxton Country Park is operated by Buxton Civic Association and the park has 100 acres of mature woodland, with a network of woodland trails. The variety of trees include Beech, Ash, Elm, Sycamore, Willow, Birch, Hawthorn and Rowan. The woods are habitat to common birds (such as thrushes, tits and finches) but are also home to nuthatches, woodpeckers and tawny owls. The country park has had a 'Go Ape' tree-top adventure course with zip wires since 2007.

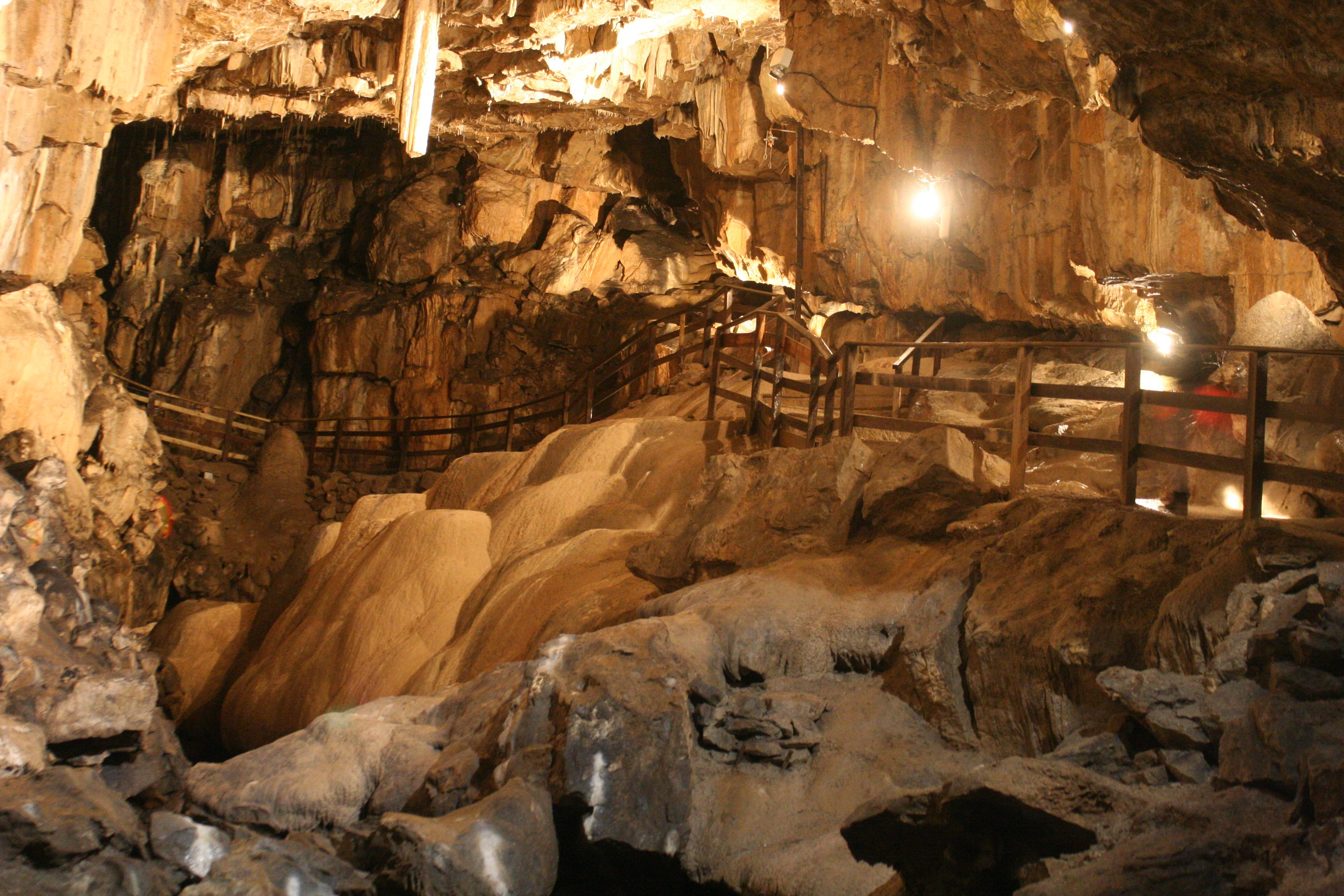
Poole's Cavern

Poole's Cavern is at the foot of the hill on the north side, on the edge of Buxton town. This natural limestone cavern is two million years old, formed by underground water dissolving the rock. It has several large chambers with numerous stalactites and stalagmites. Stone Age, Bronze Age and Roman artefacts have been discovered inside. The cavern is named after a medieval outlaw named Poole who used it as a hiding place. It has been a tourist attraction since the 1600s when it was named as one of the Seven Wonders of the Peak by Thomas Hobbes (in his book De Mirabilibus Pecci). Mary Queen of Scots is believed to have visited during her stay in Buxton in 1582. A branch of the River Wye flows through the cave system. The cavern is open to the public with tours along its 300m main passage. The temperature is a constant 7 °C.

Poole's Cavern and Grin Low Wood are a designated Site of Special Scientific Interest (SSSI).

The Dane Valley Way trail crosses the west side of the hill.
