= The Bull Ring =

Neolithic henge monument in Derbyshire

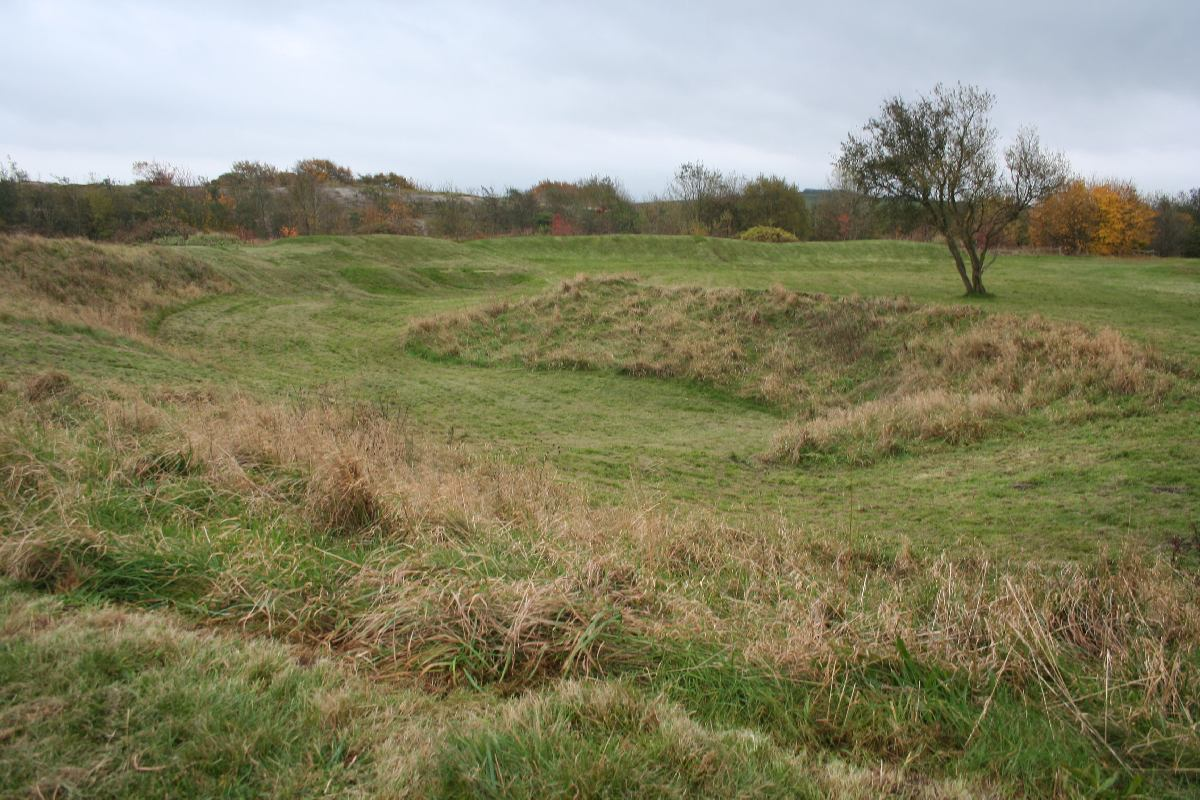
- Interactive map of The Bull Ring
- 53°18′2.5″N 1°53′3.92″W
- Type: Henge (Class II)
- Periods: late Neolithic
- Location: Dove Holes
- Region: Derbyshire, England

Site notes
- Condition: some damage

Scheduled monument
- Official name: Bull Ring henge, oval barrow and bowl barrow
- Designated: 26 November 1928
- Reference no.: 1011204

The Bull Ring is a Class II henge that was built in the Late Neolithic period near Dove Holes in Derbyshire, England.

It has coordinates 53.300695°N 1.884423°W (grid reference SK 0785 7823), and is National Monument number 23282. There are also two barrows about 20m away from the henge; one oval, one bowl.

The henge consists of a large, circular earthwork, which is currently about 1 metre (3 ft) high and 9–11 metres (30–36 ft) wide; however it was originally 2 metres (7 ft) high and 5.5–7 metres (18–23 ft) wide. The henge has a ditch on the inside, which varies between 0.5 and 1 metre (1 ft 8 in and 3 ft 3 in) deep and 8 and 12 metres (26 and 39 ft) wide; it was originally 1.2–2 metres (3 ft 11 in – 6 ft 7 in) deep and 5–6.5 metres (16–21 ft) wide. The ditch and bank are separated by a berm, which was originally 5 metres (16 ft) wide. It encloses an area 53 (north–south) by 46 (east–west) metres, with entrances to the north and south, each of which have a causeway across the ditch. A skeleton was reputedly found near the north entrance; this entrance was also damaged in the 19th century by quarrying. The centre of the henge was ploughed in the 18th century; a drystone wall was also built across the site during the same era.

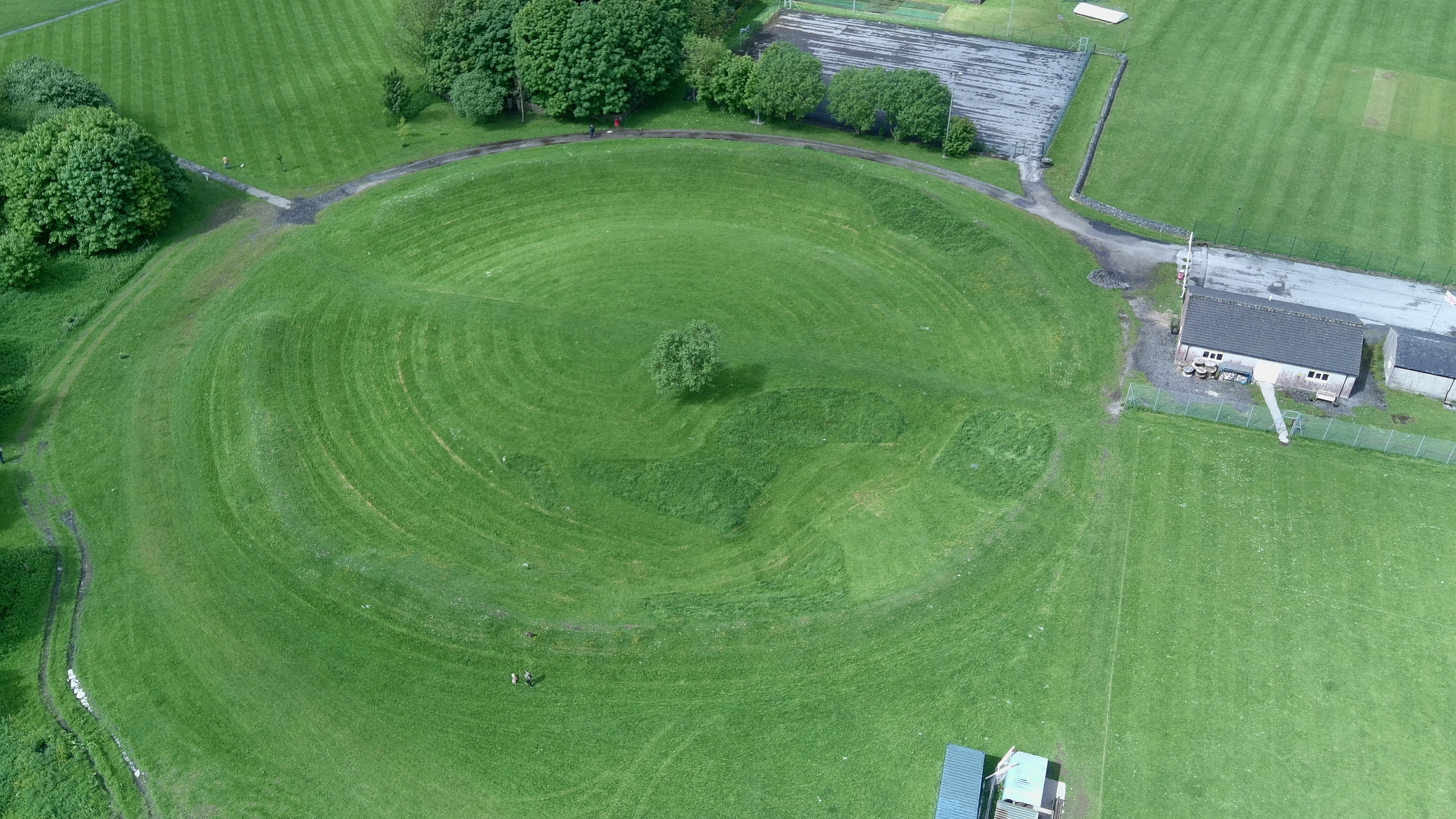
Bull Ring Henge

A single standing stone (orthostat) was recorded as remaining in 1789 by Pilkington, potentially the remnant of a stone circle. It has been suggested that stones from the henge were used as sleepers for the Peak Forest Tramway circa 1790.

A minor excavation was carried out in the west ditch in 1902 by Micah Salt; this reputedly discovered some pottery sherds and flint flakes, which have since been lost. A trial excavation by Oxford University Archaeological Society in 1949 established that the ring has two entrances, and also provided information about the original size of the bank and ditch. However, it did not provide any evidence of stones on the site. The excavation also turned up flint flakes, as well as a rim from a pottery food vessel.

A third excavation was carried out in 1984 outside the south entrance, which found further flint flakes and pottery, several pits, and stakeholes of a fence following the henge bank, which are potentially original features of the henge. Most recently, magnetometer and earth resistance surveys were carried out in 2000, with no conclusive results.

The oval barrow to the south-west of the henge is about 27 by 21 metres (89 ft × 69 ft), and is approximately 2.5 metres (8 ft 2 in) high. It was constructed some time in the early to mid-Neolithic period. A later (late Neolithic to late Bronze Age) bowl barrow is superimposed on it. The summit of the oval barrow was disturbed by a World War II slit trench; the edges of the barrow have also been disturbed by ploughing as well as a drystone wall, which has subsequently been removed. The barrow has not been excavated.

== See also ==
- Protected areas of the United Kingdom
