= Buxton Opera House =

Opera house in Buxton, England

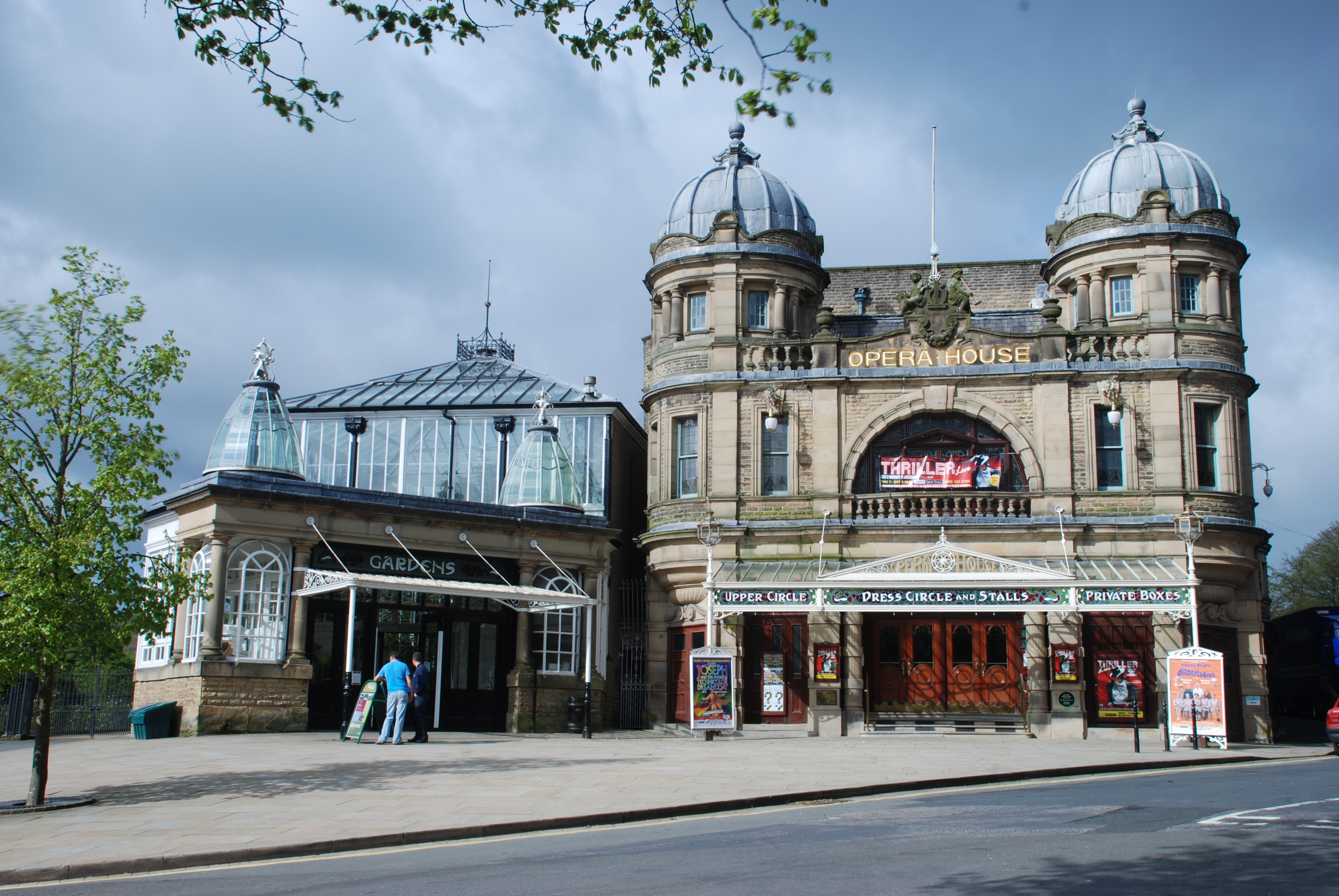
- The building in 2009
- Interactive map of Buxton Opera House
- 53.2586°N 1.9157°W
- OS grid reference: SK0562573485

History
- Built: 1903

Site notes
- Architect: Frank Matcham

Listed Building – Grade II*
- Official name: The Opera House
- Designated: 21 December 1970
- Reference no.: 1257789
- Website: buxtonoperahouse.org.uk

Buxton Opera House in The Square, Buxton, Derbyshire, England, is a 902-seat opera house. It hosts the annual Buxton Festival and the International Gilbert and Sullivan Festival, among others, as well as pantomime at Christmas, musicals and other entertainments year-round. Hosting live performances until 1927, the theatre then was used mostly as a cinema until 1976. In 1979, it was refurbished and reopened as a venue for live performance.

== History: First 75 years ==
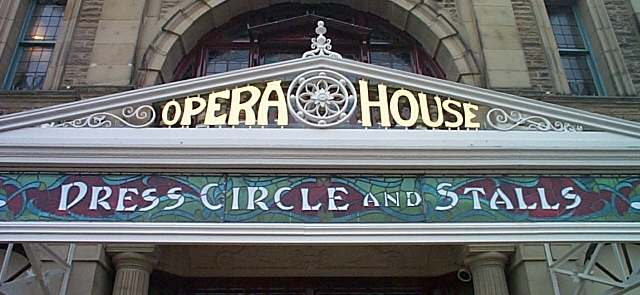
Detail above the entrance, 2005

The Buxton Opera House was built in 1903 and designed by Frank Matcham, who designed the London Palladium, the London Coliseum and many other theatres throughout the UK. The first production at the theatre was Mrs Willoughby’s Kiss. The Opera House ran as a successful theatre, receiving touring companies until 1927, when it was turned into a cinema. Silent films were shown until 1932 when the theatre was wired for sound and could present "talkies". The Opera House also became the venue for an annual summer theatre festival from 1936 to 1942, two of them in conjunction with Lilian Baylis and her London-based Old Vic company. People who performed at the theatre include the actor Alec Guinness, the comedians Ken Dodd, Peter Kay, Harry Hill, Sarah Millican and John Bishop, the musical artists Howard Jones, Aled Jones, Leo Sayer and Razorlight, and the ballerina Anna Pavlova.

After the Second World War, the theatre continued to serve primarily as a cinema. The building was designated a Grade II* listed building in 1970. The Opera House gradually fell into disrepair. In 1976, it was closed and rumours circulated that it would never reopen.

== Refurbishments and recent decades ==
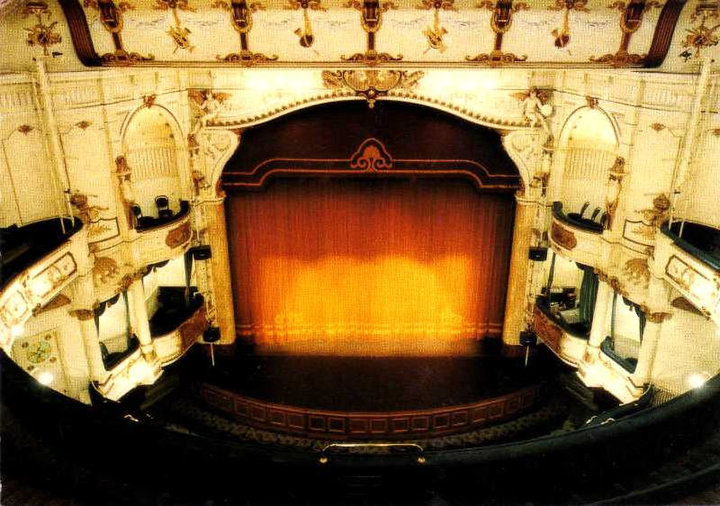
Stage, boxes and orchestra pit, 2010

In 1979, the building was restored, and an orchestra pit was added to the original Matcham design. Since then, the Opera House has been a full-time venue for stage productions, presenting approximately 450 performances per year, including opera, dance, musical theatre, pantomime, comedy, drama, children's shows and concerts. The theatre is staffed by a small full-time technical crew for all the backstage work, setting up all the shows and artists that appear. Volunteers from the local community are also employed for front-of-house duties including bar work and as ushers.

By the 1990s, more work was needed to repair and modernise the theatre, and from 1999 to 2001 an extensive programme of internal and external restoration took place. In February 2007, another refurbishment was completed at the Opera House that saw the installation of air conditioning in the gallery and backstage area, new seats in the gallery and upper circle, a new get-in lift to replace the ramp and new backstage working lights as well as re-wiring and painting the backstage area and dressing rooms. The current capacity is 902 seats.

In 2011, FT Magazine featured an article on opera house design. The writer praised the European opera houses "designed by the Viennese architectural firm of Fellner and Helmer (the Zurich Opera House is [an] example) ... [which] represent a near-ideal marriage of size, acoustic and decorative beauty. Their British equivalents are those designed by Frank Matcham – best of all the Buxton Opera House." In 2014, the Opera House's former finance chief was jailed for two years for stealing nearly £250,000 from the theatre's accounts in 2012 and 2013.

== Theatre complex ==
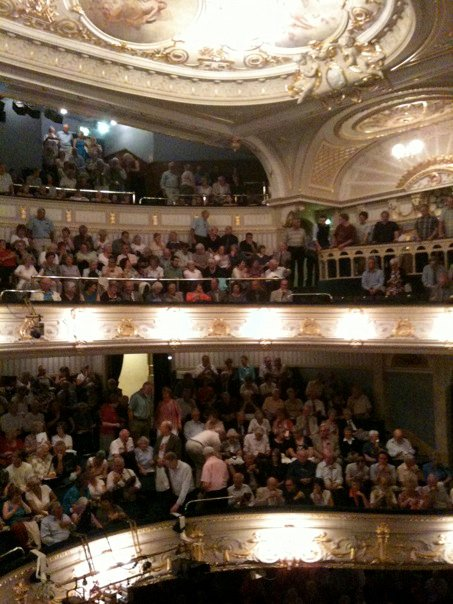
Upper tiers in the house, 2008

The theatre complex also includes the adjacent Victorian Pavilion, the 369-seat Pavilion Arts Centre (rebuilt in 2010; formerly the Paxton Theatre and earlier known as the Playhouse Theatre and The Hippodrome). There the Literary and Dramatic Societies of Buxton College and Cavendish Grammar School staged annual performances of either Shakespeare, such as Hamlet (1966), Coriolanus (1968) and Macbeth (1970), or modern works, such as Bertolt Brecht's Life of Galileo (1967) and Dylan Thomas's The Doctor & the Devils (1969). It also includes the Octagon Hall auditorium (built in 1875), as well as a two-storey restaurant with a bar and gift shop. The arts centre stage area can be converted into a separate 93-seat studio theatre.

== Festivals ==
Since July 1979, the Opera House and theatre complex has been home to the Buxton Festival, which runs for about two weeks in mid-July and has developed into one of Britain's largest opera-based festivals. Typically, it includes a Handel opera (with conductors such as Harry Christophers) and other rarely seen operas as well as more popular classics. Running alongside it is the Buxton Festival Fringe. It is popular as a warm-up for the Edinburgh Fringe, and it now claims to be the largest 'true' fringe festival in the UK.

Since 1994 the Opera House also hosted the annual three-week-long International Gilbert and Sullivan Festival, attracting audiences from all over the UK and from abroad. (Note: From 2014 to 2022 the Gilbert and Sullivan Festival was held mostly in Harrogate after generally spending a week in Buxton, but in 2023 it is scheduled to return entirely to Buxton for its full duration.)

The Opera House presents over 400 performances each year. From 2004 to 2013, the theatre hosted the annual Four Four Time music festival which saw a wide variety of musical performances over ten days each February. Performers for the 2008 festival included Marc Almond, Richard Hawley, the Stranglers and Boy George.

== See also ==
- Grade II* listed buildings in High Peak
- Listed buildings in Buxton

== Sources ==
- Earl, John; Sell, Michael (2000). The Theatres Trust Guide to British Theatres 1750–1950. London: A & C Black. ISBN 978-0-71365-688-6.
