= Solomon's Temple, Buxton =

Solomon's Temple
- Grinlow Tower
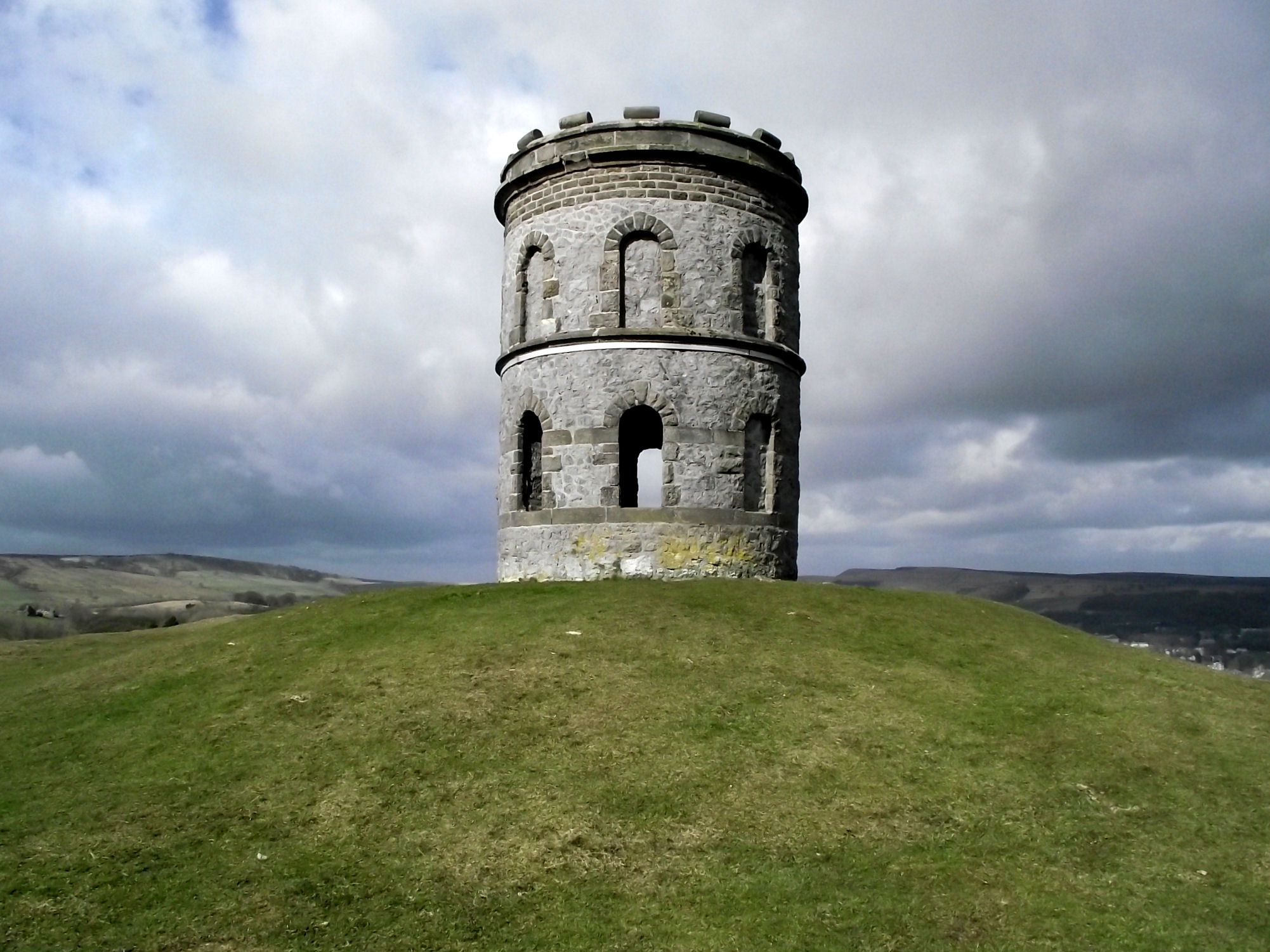
- Solomon's Temple from the south

- Location within Derbyshire
- 53.242709°N 1.920569°W
- Location: near Buxton, Derbyshire

History
- Built: 1896

Site notes
- Architect(s): W. R. Bryden; G. E. Garlick

Listed Building – Grade II
- Official name: Grinlow Tower
- Designated: 7 January 1987
- Reference no.: 1259254

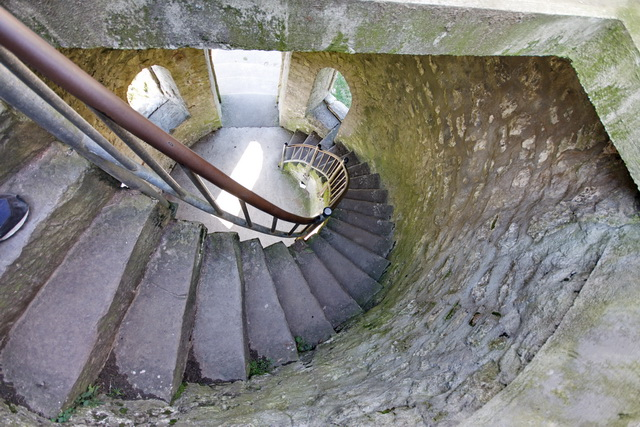
Internal staircase

Solomon's Temple, also known as Grinlow Tower, is a Victorian folly on the summit of Grin Low hill, near the spa town of Buxton in the Derbyshire Peak District.

On 23 February 1894, a meeting at Buxton Town Hall decided to rebuild a landmark tower that had been built by Solomon Mycock, of the Cheshire Cheese Hotel, in the early 19th century, and of which only a few stones remained. The Local Board vice-chairman had talked with the seventh Duke of Devonshire's agent and decided that the reconstruction was feasible if the townspeople would donate sufficient money. Sketches were submitted by architects W. R. Bryden and G. E. Garlick. By May, the plans were confirmed by the Duke, and it was well known that the site was of prehistoric importance. In June, the Duke subscribed £25 towards building the folly. Buxton had already subscribed £50. The foundation stone was laid by Colonel Sidebottom, M.P., on 31 May 1896, witnessed by a large crowd, and the tower was opened by Victor Cavendish in September 1896.

The tower was restored in 1988 by public subscription.

The structure is a 20-foot-high (6.1 m), two-storey tower built on top of a Bronze Age barrow, sitting on top of a ridge at a height of 440 metres (1,440 ft) above sea level. From the open top of the tower there are good 360-degree views over the town and the surrounding countryside and parts of the Peak District. The tower does not contain anything other than the staircase to the top. It is a Grade II listed building.

== See also ==
- Listed buildings in Buxton
