= Offcote and Underwood =

Civil parish in Derbyshire, England

Coordinates: 53.024°N 1.705°W

- Civil parish
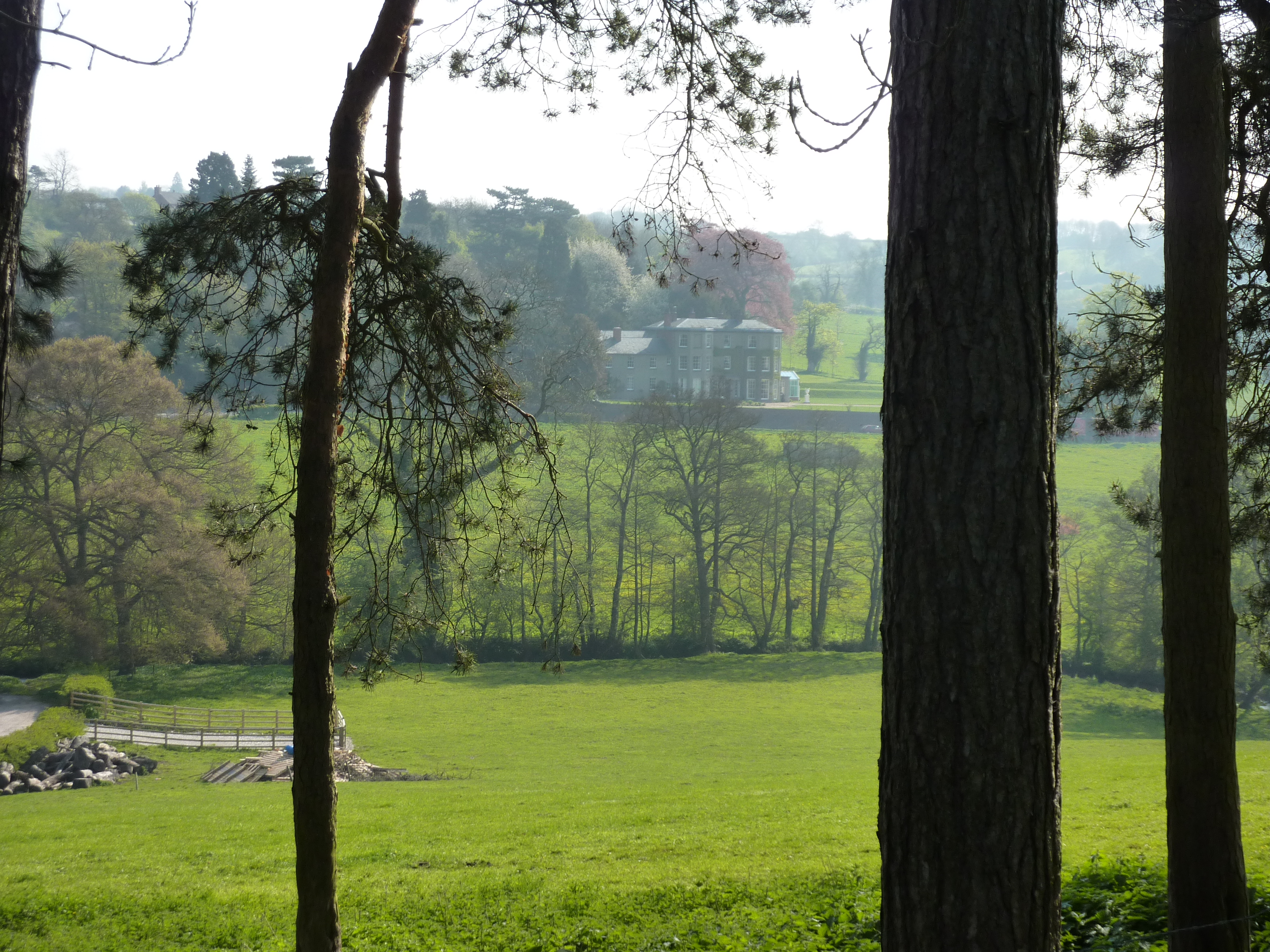
- Sandybrook Hall

- Location within Derbyshire
- Interactive map of Offcote and Underwood
- Area: 3.05 sq mi (7.9 km^{2})
- Population: 526 (2011)
  - Density: 172/sq mi (66/km^{2})
- OS grid reference: SK 190475
  - London: 125 mi (201 km) SE
- District: Derbyshire Dales
- Shire county: Derbyshire
- Region: East Midlands
- Country: England
- Sovereign state: United Kingdom
- Settlements: Ashbourne (part): Sturston
- Post town: ASHBOURNE
- Postcode district: DE6
- Dialling code: 01335
- Police: Derbyshire
- Fire: Derbyshire
- Ambulance: East Midlands
- UK Parliament: Derbyshire Dales
- Website: offcotepc.org.uk

Offcote and Underwood is a civil parish within the Derbyshire Dales district, in the county of Derbyshire, England. Largely rural, in 2011 the parish had a population of 526. It is 125 miles (201 km) north west of London, 13 miles (21 km) north west of the county city of Derby, and 1 mile (1 1/2 km) north east of the market town of Ashbourne. Offcote and Underwood borders the Peak District, and touches the parishes of Ashbourne, Bradley, Clifton and Compton, Fenny Bentley, Kniveton, Mapleton and Okeover. There are 12 listed buildings in Offcote and Underwood.

== Geography ==
=== Location ===
Offcote and Underwood is surrounded by the following local areas:

- Fenny Bentley and Kniveton to the north
- Ashbourne, Bradley, Clifton and Yeldersley to the south
- Atlow to the east
- Mapleton to the west.

The parish is roughly bounded by the Bentley Brook to the west, Guddlefield Brook and Sandy Brook to the north, Kniveton Brook, Henmore Brook and the A517 road in the east, with a narrow fork of land on the west encircling Ashbourne towards Hangingbridge, Buckholme Farm and the River Dove in the south west.

Offcote and Underwood border the Peak District National Park, which is to the north.

=== Settlements ===
There are no standalone villages of size as much of the area is rural. Despite being part of the parish name, Underwood is considered to be a deserted medieval village, with only Underwood Farm using the placename as a title. Offcote is little more evident, with a handful of scattered residences towards the east of the area using it as a prefix, such as Offcote Grange, Offcote House and Offcote Cottage. There is a small northern suburb of Ashbourne that spans the border into Offcote and Underwood, centred around Manor Road. Ashbourne Green is a commons area of 46 acres located nearby. Sturston is a small historic hamlet contained to the south east of the parish.

=== Environment ===
==== Landscape and geology ====
Primarily farm and pasture land throughout the parish outside the populated areas, there are some small forestry plots throughout including The Dumble, a stretch surrounding Sandy Brook. The soil is mixed; subsoil, chiefly gravel, clay and limestone.

==== Water features ====
A number of streams form the boundaries of the parish including Guddlefield Brook and Sandy Brook to the north, Kniveton Brook and Henmore Brook to the east, and the River Dove in the south west.

==== Land elevation ====
The parish can be hilly and undulating in places. It ranges from 110–230 metres (360–750 ft), the lowest point is by the western boundary near Hangingbridge, while the parish peak is along the northern boundary surrounding the B5035 Green Road towards Kniveton.

== History ==
=== Toponymy ===
Offcote: This was reported in Domesday as Ophidecotes. It is suggested the first element is a person called Offa and that the second is from an Old English compound word 'wood-cot'.

Underwood: Being close to Offcote, it was the land under or within the wood. It was first noted in 13th- and 14th-century charters.

Offcote and Underwood, as an ecclesiastical and subsequent political entity, were first constituted as a township within the parish of Ashbourne and subsequently separated out as an independent parish liberty, and later civil parish.

=== Local history ===
Offcote and Underwood were originally separate townships and manors in times past, with Christopher Saxton's map of 1579 the last record indicating Underwood as a discrete settlement, but these were later merged as a township within the ancient parish of Ashbourne, latterly becoming a parish liberty during the time of Charles I, and further, parish. From the late 19th century the parish ceded territory to neighbouring parishes Clifton and Compton as well as Ashbourne, losing Ashbourne Hall in the process. However, it gained land from the abolition of Sturston parish in 1933, which brought the mill and hall into Offcote and Underwood, although the hamlet of Nether Sturston went to Ashbourne.

In 1733, a workhouse was formed in a row of four cottages along Dark Lane which originally housed the elderly. A purpose-built facility was constructed in 1848, later becoming the original St Oswald's Hospital. By the early to mid-1700s, the Hayne family held much of the land of Offcote-Underwood and were lords of the manor. By the turn of the 20th century, the parish was described as a very scattered district, with a number of manors being held. Green Hall was the property of the Williamsons who by then were the lords of the manor, formerly owned by the Newtons, with the lordship of the Offcote and Underwood and freehold of Ashbourne Green held with the residence into present times. Offcote Hurst was the residence of Colonel Richard H. Jelf, a noted army officer. Sandybrook Hall was held by Sir Horace Blakiston of the Blakiston baronets. A then reported landowner was Reverend Henry Buckston of Bradbourne Hall.

== Industry ==
As well as the regularised agricultural roles because of its rural location, primarily for pasture farming, the area has also supported clay mining for many centuries, with several pits previously recorded in the vicinity. From the early 1800s, there was a corn mill at Sturston until the late 20th century. The Ashbourne Gas Company had buildings from 1840 until the mid-1950s in the southwest of the parish along Mayfield Road. A water treatment plant currently functions near Hangingbridge.

== Governance and demography ==
=== Population ===
There are 526 residents recorded within the parish for the 2011 census.

=== Council administration ===
The parish is managed at the first level of public administration by Offcote and Underwood Parish Council. At district level, the wider area is overseen by Derbyshire Dales district council. Derbyshire County Council provides the highest level strategic services locally.

== Community, culture and leisure ==
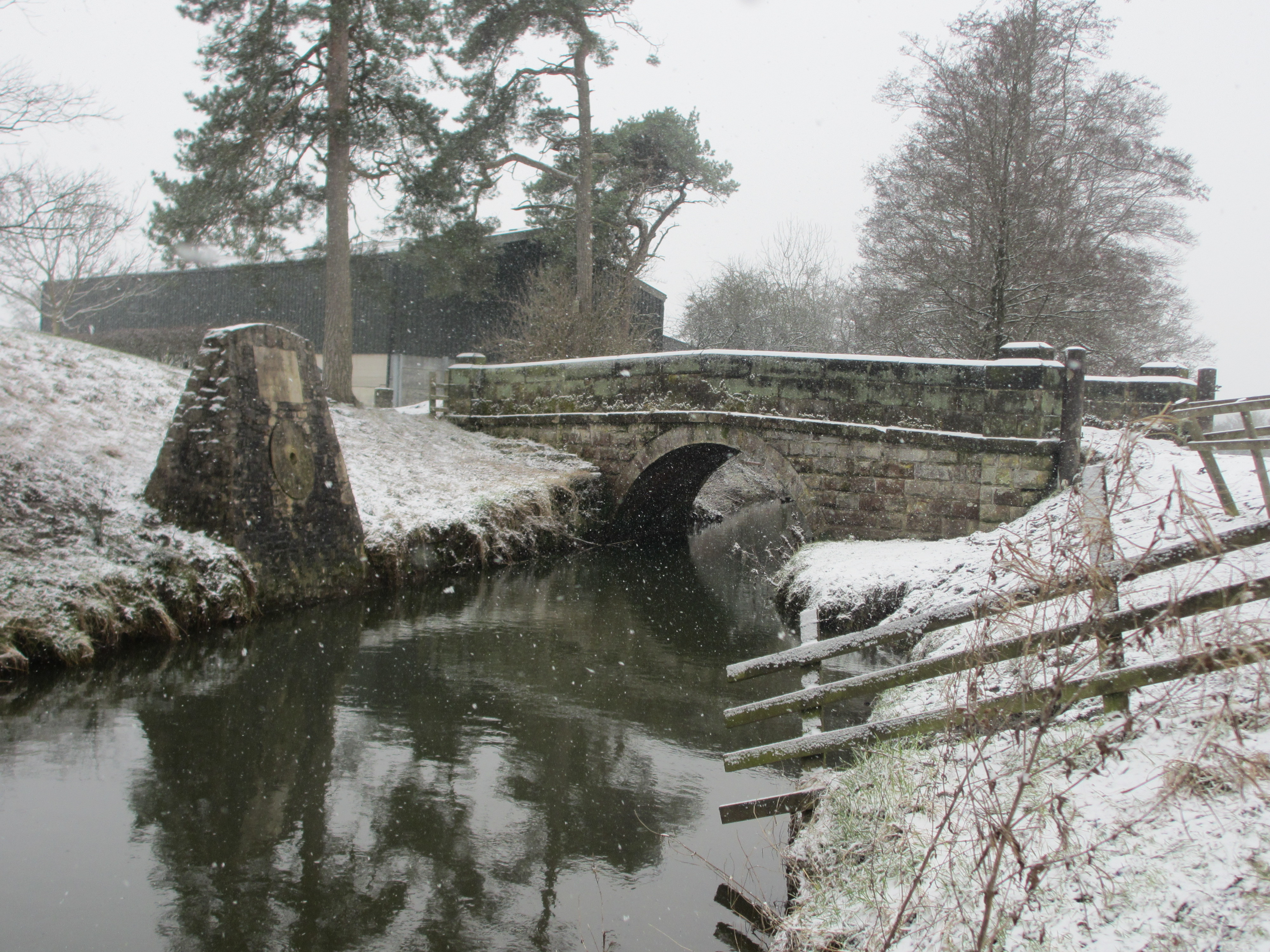
Royal Shrovetide football goal, Sturston

There are a number of holiday lodges and campsites locally to cater particularly for Peak District visitors.

=== Tissington Trail and cycle route ===
The medium distance Peak District walking route Tissington Trail and route 68 of the National Cycle Network follow the now unused Ashbourne railway line, which crosses through the south west leg of the parish.

=== Royal Shrovetide football goal & memorial ===
This is a medieval football game played annually on Shrove Tuesday and Ash Wednesday in the town of Ashbourne. One of the goals is by the Henmore Brook along Watery Lane close to Sturston Mill. There is an associated sculpture, 'The Hug' on Mayfield Road.

== Landmarks ==
=== Listed buildings ===
There are 12 listed structures in the parish, all at Grade II designation. A number of halls, farmhouses and their outbuildings, and a milepost, feature.

=== Local monuments ===
An area preserving a medieval moat, surrounding ditch and outer bank is located approximately 70m north of Sturston Hall, a ridge and furrow west of the moat, and buried remains of a 13th-century mill north of the moat is recorded as a scheduled monument.
