= Ashbourne Urban District =

Former local government area in the UK

Coordinates: 53.016°N 1.731°W

Ashbourne
- Ashbourne Urban District shown within Derbyshire in 1970
- Area
  - 1911: 573 acres (2.32 km^{2})
  - 1961: 1,070 acres (4.3 km^{2})
- Population
  - 1911: 4,059
  - 1961: 5,660
- History
  - Created: 1894
  - Abolished: 1974
  - Succeeded by: West Derbyshire
- Status: Urban District
- Government: Ashbourne Urban District Council
  - HQ: Ashbourne

Ashbourne was an urban district in Derbyshire, England, from 1894 to 1974. It was created under the Local Government Act 1894.

It was enlarged in 1934 when parts of the Clifton and Compton and Sturston civil parishes were transferred to the district.

The district was abolished in 1974 under the Local Government Act 1972 and combined with various other local government districts in western Derbyshire to form the new West Derbyshire district.
