= Clifton and Compton =

Civil parish in Derbyshire, England

Coordinates: 53.001°N 1.754°W

- Civil parish
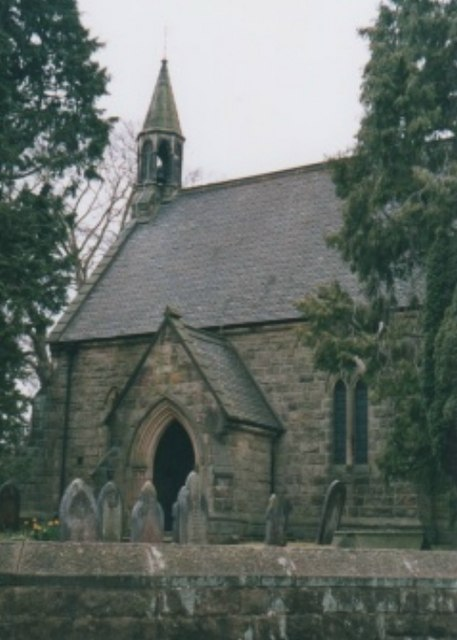
- Holy Trinity Church at Clifton

- Location within Derbyshire
- Interactive map of Clifton and Compton
- Area: 1.40 sq mi (3.6 km^{2})
- Population: 476 (2021)
  - Density: 340/sq mi (130/km^{2})
- OS grid reference: SK 167448
  - London: 124 mi (200 km) SE
- District: Derbyshire Dales
- Shire county: Derbyshire
- Region: East Midlands
- Country: England
- Sovereign state: United Kingdom
- Settlements: Clifton; Clifton Cross; Hangingbridge
- Post town: ASHBOURNE
- Postcode district: DE6
- Dialling code: 01335
- Police: Derbyshire
- Fire: Derbyshire
- Ambulance: East Midlands
- UK Parliament: Derbyshire Dales
- Website: Clifton parish council

Clifton and Compton is a civil parish within the Derbyshire Dales district, in the county of Derbyshire, England. The parish, despite the name, only includes the villages of Clifton and Hangingbridge; there is a place named Compton nearby in Ashbourne parish. In the 2021 census the parish had a population of 476 residents, a reduction from 500 in 2011. It is 124 miles (200 km) north west of London, 13 miles (21 km) north west of the county city of Derby, and 1 1/3 miles (2 1/4 km) south west of the market town of Ashbourne. Clifton and Compton touches the parishes of Ashbourne, Edlaston and Wyaston, Mayfield, Offcote and Underwood, Osmaston, Okeover and Snelston. There are eight listed buildings in Clifton and Compton.

== Geography ==
=== Location ===
Clifton and Compton is surrounded by the following local areas:

- Ashbourne and Compton to the north
- Edlaston and Snelston to the south
- Osmaston to the east
- Mayfield to the west.

The parish is bounded roughly by the A52 road along the north, the River Dove by the west, Sides Lane and Dobbinhorse Lane along the south, and Wyaston Road to the east.

=== Settlements ===
The two settlements within the parish are:

- Clifton
- Hangingbridge

==== Clifton ====
The larger of the two areas, it is sited west of the A515 road which then routes through the town of Ashbourne and beyond. It is hemmed in by the now defunct railway route to Ashbourne as well as Henmore brook to the west, and higher ground to the south. It lies centre west of the parish, and while primarily residential, the village maintains some core amenities such as church, village community centre and school. Cliftoncross is a small cluster of residences attached to the village at its northern perimeter surrounding Doles Lane.

==== Hangingbridge ====
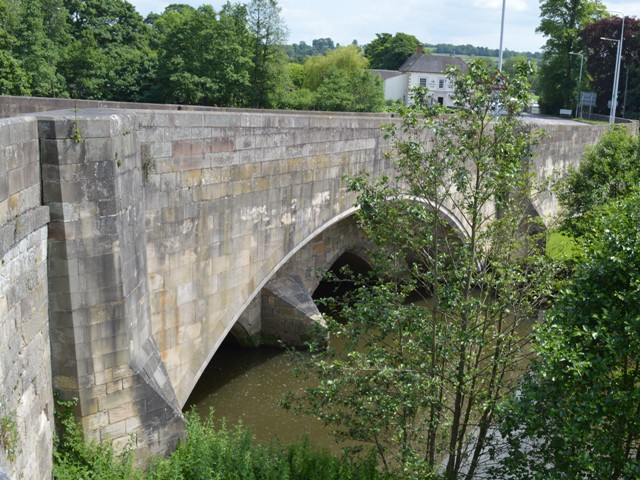
Hanging Bridge across the River Dove towards the village of Hangingbridge. The original medieval bridge can be seen within the arch.

This is 1/2 mile (3/4 km) north of Clifton, separated by greenfield land and the Henmore brook. Hangingbridge is named after the bridge which crosses the River Dove nearby, usually as the words joined as one to distinguish it from the structure. It is a semi-rural village with a number of built-up areas in close proximity, and comprises a nucleus of residential buildings centred around Watery Lane with surrounding farms. However, there are several commercial premises along the A52 Mayfield Road.

=== Landscape ===
==== Woods ====
Primarily farmland throughout the parish outside the villages, there is some small forestry plots throughout the parish. Clifton village is relatively 'leafy' with trees interspersed amongst residences and gardens.

==== Water features ====
The River Dove is much of the western boundary of the parish, which is also the county border. Henmore Brook enters the parish at its north eastern edge, and as a tributary flows into the Dove.

==== Land elevation ====
The parish contains some of the highest land locally, ranging from 110 metres (360 ft) at Hangingbridge, 120–125 metres (394–410 ft) in Clifton, the Ashbourne Golf Club in the north east plateaus at 165 metres (541 ft), while the parish peak is by the far east boundary at 172 metres (564 ft).

== History ==
=== Toponymy ===
Clifton: This was reported in Domesday as Cliptune and Cliftune, before a recognisable form appearing in public records from the 13th century, meaning 'farm on a hill-slope'.

Compton: Meaning 'valley with an enclosure' or possibly 'valley in which a fight took place', this was first recorded in the 13th century.

Clifton and Compton, as a political entity it was created in 1866 from a combined parish township.

=== Compton ===
The name Compton (post Domesday it was known as Campdene) may go back to before the Norman Conquest in 1066, although it was only first recorded in the middle 13th century. The name may mean ‘the valley where a fight occurred’. In the period 875 to 925 Ashbourne was between land controlled by the English and the Danish. Derby was conquered in 917 by the English, and further fighting around Compton is possible. Compton is in present times a suburb within the town of Ashbourne. However, it was readded administratively to Ashbourne in 1894, originally being in a combined township of the town until 1846 before Clifton and Compton became a separate parish. The north edge with Ashbourne, the Henmore Brook was a boundary before the Conquest. Compton itself was divided between two townships split by Compton Street in the town, the east of Compton was in Sturston and the western portion was part of Clifton. This dividing line location was likely introduced before Compton was settled and could also be pre-Conquest. Unusually, the Compton subtitle was not removed from the remaining parish legal name and remains to this day.

=== Clifton ===
Along with Compton it once formed a township in the parish of Ashbourne, then a separate parish until Compton was reabsorbed by Ashbourne. By the 1880s much of Clifton and Sturston was owned by the Smith family who made their wealth from cheese processing, with factories in the vicinity. They were great donators, providing money for playgrounds, a cricket pitch, as well as the Holy Trinity Church. At various times they also lived at Clifton Hall. In 1899 according to White's Directory, John Harrison of Snelston Hall, was lord of the manor, the Smith family and G. H. Errington from Southampton being recorded as principal landowners. Although Ashbourne and Dove Valley Golf Club was established in 1886, it was sited elsewhere at a number of locations until 1909 when it moved to Clifton and a 9-hole course was built on land, the majority of which originally formed part of Hollies Farm. Further land was later obtained from Lodge Farm allowing expansion to its present 18 holes.

==== Clifton Cross ====
This is a small hamlet originally consisting of a few cottages on the road from Ashbourne to Clifton, only a few hundred yards from the core village. The lane from Ashbourne to Clifton village was crossed by a road from Leek and Manchester which had passed over Hanging Bridge in Mayfield parish, and through Green Lane, and went across moorland country to join the old road from Ashbourne to Tutbury about 2 miles to the south side of Ashbourne. The south edge of this crossroad from Clifton Cross onwards has been closed since the early 1800s, though it was kept open for a number of years longer as a bridle track. Traces of the road exist on what is the present day golf course and surrounding fields.

==== Clifton Hall ====
The Hall stands on land which was owned by 1460 with the Cockayne family of Ashbourne. They continued to hold the manor under the Fitzherberts of Norbury until 1594. The manor then transferred to the Hayne family who may have been responsible for its build in the mid-18th Century. The house was later purchased by William Smith, a local cheese products manufacturer, remaining with the family until the death of Rev F C Smith in 1933. In 1948 the hall was divided into two homes and was sold in 1950. A later owner returned the hall to the original single house in the late 1960s. In 1975 it was again sold and run as a small hotel, this owner then divided the remaining land for building and sold the hall in 1998, becoming again a private residence.

=== Hangingbridge ===
The Hanging Bridge is a structure with five pointed arches situated some 3/4 mile (1.2 km) west of the village of Hangingbridge. It was probably built in the 14th century though it was partly concealed by widening in 1937, this improvement serving to illustrate the progression from medieval packhorse transport to larger-scale cart transport. It is thought that the bridge was named following the events of 1745, however it was already often referred to as Hanging Bridge at least 200 years earlier, and more likely the name of Hanging Bridge came from an early form of suspension bridge that spanned the River Dove, and not because it was a place of execution.

The 1745 legend involved the defeat of Bonnie Prince Charlie in Derby in that year, with his forces making their way back to the north, they took their frustrations at their defeat out on the locals. As they passed through Mayfield, the villagers used the church as a refuge, but were shot at by the soldiers. The invaders were supposedly caught and hanged from gallows over the side of the bridge. A gibbet was found near Mayfield at the junction of Gallowstree Lane and Old Bank. Road junctions were then the usual place for siting gallows so that the corpses of those hung would be seen by all passers-by to deter others from being involved in crime. The gallows were a landmark feature that would have been easily seen from a distance. The gallows may have been a tree or it could have been a built structure. In 1745 executions were unlikely to have occurred elsewhere, particularly somewhere relatively less prominent such as the Hanging Bridge.

Additionally, James Rolleston (or Rolston), a member of a wealthy family and an MP for Newcastle-under-Lyme that gave to the building of Mayfield church in the 1300s and then added the tower in 1515, mentioned the Hanging Bridge in his will. He left £2 each for repairs to both the church and the "Hanging Bridge", the will dated 1553. Even before this, an earlier reference to the bridge is in a 13th-century local charter written in Latin. Another theory is that the word ‘hanging’ derives from the Old English word ‘han’ meaning a wild bird and ‘gan’ meaning at the bottom of a hill. It is possible that a thousand years ago Saxons were already referring to the crossing as ‘Hangan Bridge’, with it extending to the modern form at some later date.

Hangingbridge the settlement, was transferred from Offcote and Underwood township to Clifton in 1887.

=== Railway and station ===
Clifton (for Mayfield) railway station was sited along the North Staffordshire Railway, Ashbourne branch. It was opened in 1852, and closed in 1963. It was accessed via Watery Lane, the station building is now a private residence.

== Governance and demography ==
=== Population ===
There are 476 residents recorded within the parish for the 2021 census, a reduction from the 500 counted in 2011.

=== Council administration ===
The settlements Clifton, Hangingbridge and their surrounding rural areas are combined as one parish for administrative identity. This is managed at the first level of public administration by Clifton and Compton Parish Council. At district level, the wider area is overseen by Derbyshire Dales district council. Derbyshire County Council provides the highest level strategic services locally.

== Landmarks ==
=== Listed buildings ===
There are eight listed structures in the parish, most including the church and the public house at Hangingbridge are Grade II, with the Hanging Bridge carrying the A52 over the River Dove at the higher designation of Grade II*.

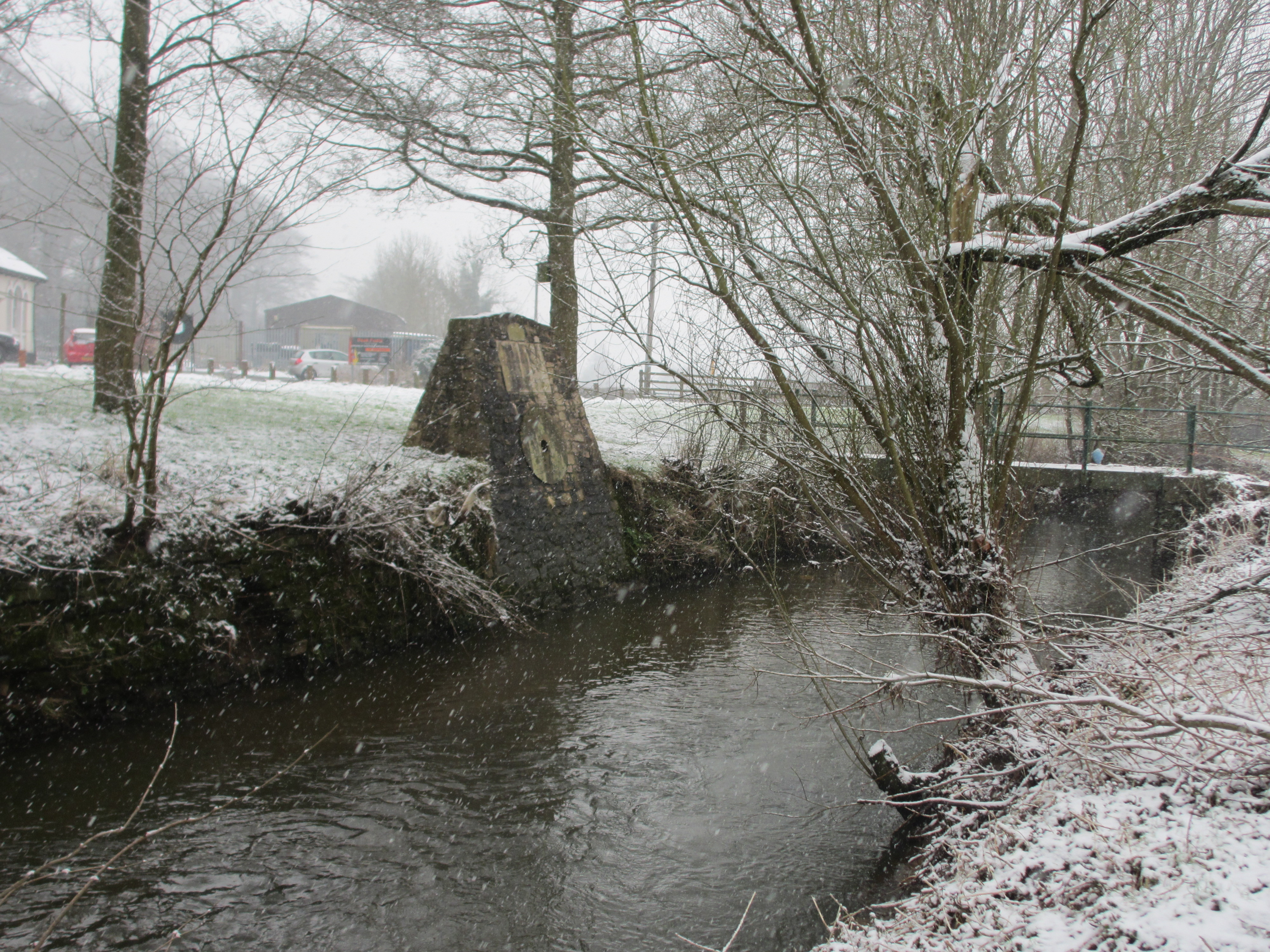
Royal Shrovetide Football 'goal'

=== Royal Shrovetide football goal ===
This is a medieval football game played annually on Shrove Tuesday and Ash Wednesday in the town of Ashbourne in Derbyshire, England. One of the goals is in Clifton by the Henmore Brook along Watery Lane, and is in an adjoining commemorative garden.

=== Tumulus ===
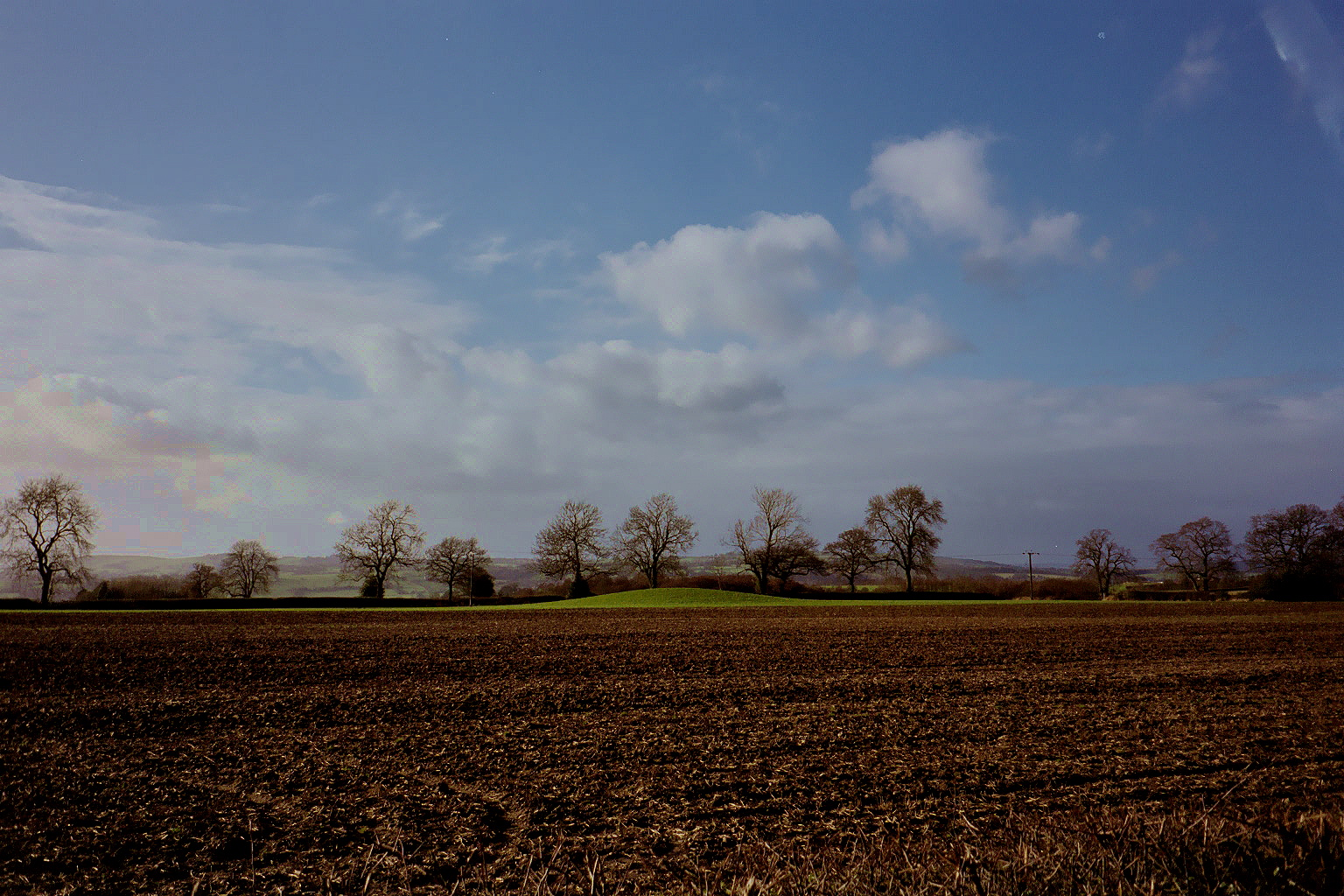
Tumulus - Wyaston; named by Historic England as Tinker's Inn bowl barrow (north)

There is a number of tumulus (historic burial mounds) throughout the wider region, with two sites in the south east of the parish known as the Tinker's Inn bowl barrows, both recorded as scheduled monuments.

== Education ==
There is a school in the main village, Clifton Primary.

== Community & leisure ==
A community hall is in use at Clifton village. There is a recreation ground in Clifton. There are public houses at both villages. Ashbourne Golf Club takes up a sizeable portion of the north eastern corner of the parish.

== Religious sites ==
The present Anglican parish church, Holy Trinity Church in Clifton, is to an 1845 design by Henry Isaac Stevens to replace an earlier chapel of ease St. Mary's, which due to disuse and decay was demolished in 1750. The apse and bell tower were added later, in 1868, by Slater and Carpenter.

Other denominations included a Primitive Methodist chapel built in 1830, and a Wesleyan Methodist chapel built in 1860, both were located in Mayfield Road.

== Sport ==
- Ashbourne Golf Club is sited to the centre and east of the area, it has 18 holes.
- Royal Shrovetide Football takes place within the parish.
- Clifton Cricket Club have a ground on Chapel Lane. They have male and female teams. The former play in Division One of the Derbyshire County Cricket League.
