= Sturston =

Sturston could be

- Sturston, Derbyshire
- Sturston, Norfolk
