= Listed buildings in Clifton and Compton =

Clifton and Compton is a civil parish in the Derbyshire Dales district of Derbyshire, England. The parish contains eight listed buildings that are recorded in the National Heritage List for England. Of these, one is listed at Grade II*, the middle of the three grades, and the others are at Grade II, the lowest grade. The parish contains the villages of Clifton and Hangingbridge, and the surrounding area. The listed buildings consist of houses, cottages and associated structures, a church, its lychgate and wall, a road bridge, and a public house.

== Key ==
Grade	Criteria
II*	Particularly important buildings of more than special interest
II	Buildings of national importance and special interest

== Buildings ==
Name and location	Photograph	Date	Notes	Grade
Hanging Bridge; 53.00946°N 1.76570°W		14th century	The bridge carries Mayfield Road (A52 road) over the River Dove and a mill stream, and it was widened in the late 19th century. It is in stone, and has two pointed arches over the river, and three over the mill stream. The arches over the river have a cutwater, and above them is a segmental arch with buttresses. The bridge has parapets, and continues as a retaining wall for about 100 metres (330 ft) to the southwest, and 50 metres (160 ft) to the northwest.	II*
Royal Oak Public House; 53.00899°N 1.76414°W		17th century	The public house is rendered, and has a tile roof, hipped on the west front and gabled at the rear, and a double depth plan. The front has two storeys and three bays, chamfered quoins, a floor band, and a moulded eaves cornice. In the centre is a doorway with Tuscan pilasters, and the windows are sashes with moulded architraves. At the rear are two storeys and attics, two gables, and a gabled single-storey projection, and it contains mullioned windows.	II
Church Cottage; 53.00016°N 1.75456°W	—	18th century or earlier	The cottage is in rendered sandstone and brick, with a dentilled eaves band and a tile roof. There are two storeys at the west end, one storey and an attic on the east, a rear outshut, and a front of two bays. On the front is a timber porch with fretted bargeboards. The windows are casements, the upper window in the right bay in a gabled dormer.	II
Clifton Hall, wall and railings 52.99952°N 1.75333°W	—	Late 18th century	The house is in red brick with a parapet and a Welsh slate roof. There are three storeys at the front and two at the rear. The front has three bays, the ground floor projects, and contains a projecting porch with engaged Ionic columns. The windows are sashes with wedge lintels. In the right return are four bays, and a French window flanked by canted bay windows. Enclosing the forecourt is a low wall and railings with intersecting ovals, and a taller brick wall extends along the road to the east.	II
Clifton House, gates, wall and railings 52.99976°N 1.75428°W	—	Early 19th century	The house, later divided into two, is rendered, and has tile roofs. There are three storeys, five bays, and a two-storey gabled bay at each end. In the centre is a porch with Doric columns, flanked by canted bay windows, over which are balconies with iron railings and French windows surrounded by latticework and pilasters. In front of the left bay is a conservatory, and the windows are sashes. Along the front of the forecourt is a low wall with iron railings and gates.	II
Holy Trinity Church; 53.00039°N 1.75471°W		1844–45	The apse and bell turret were added to the church in 1869. It is in sandstone with a tile roof, and consists of a nave, a south porch, a chancel with a canted apse and two north vestries. On the west gable is an octagonal corbelled out bell turret with a pyramidal roof. At the west end is a rose window.	II
The Croft, wall and railings 52.99993°N 1.75474°W	—	1870s	The house is in red brick with sandstone dressings and a Welsh slate roof. There are two storeys and attics and three bays, the middle bay recessed. In the middle bay is an arched doorway, above which is an arched window with a hood mould, and in the roof is a dormer with a half-hipped roof. The outer bays are gabled with quoins, floor bands, and fretted bargeboards. In the ground floor is a canted bay window, the upper floor contains an arched window with a hood mould, and in the attic is a single-light window with a quatrefoil above and a hood mould. In front of the house are brick walls with iron railings.	II
Lychgate and churchyard wall, Holy Trinity Church; 53.00024°N 1.75448°W		1914	A clock was added to the lychgate in 1924. It has a sandstone base, the superstructure is in timber, and it has a gabled tile roof, on which is a bell turret with pyramidal lead roof. Enclosing the churchyard is a sandstone wall.	II
