= Buxton Crescent =

Grade I listed architectural structure in the United Kingdom

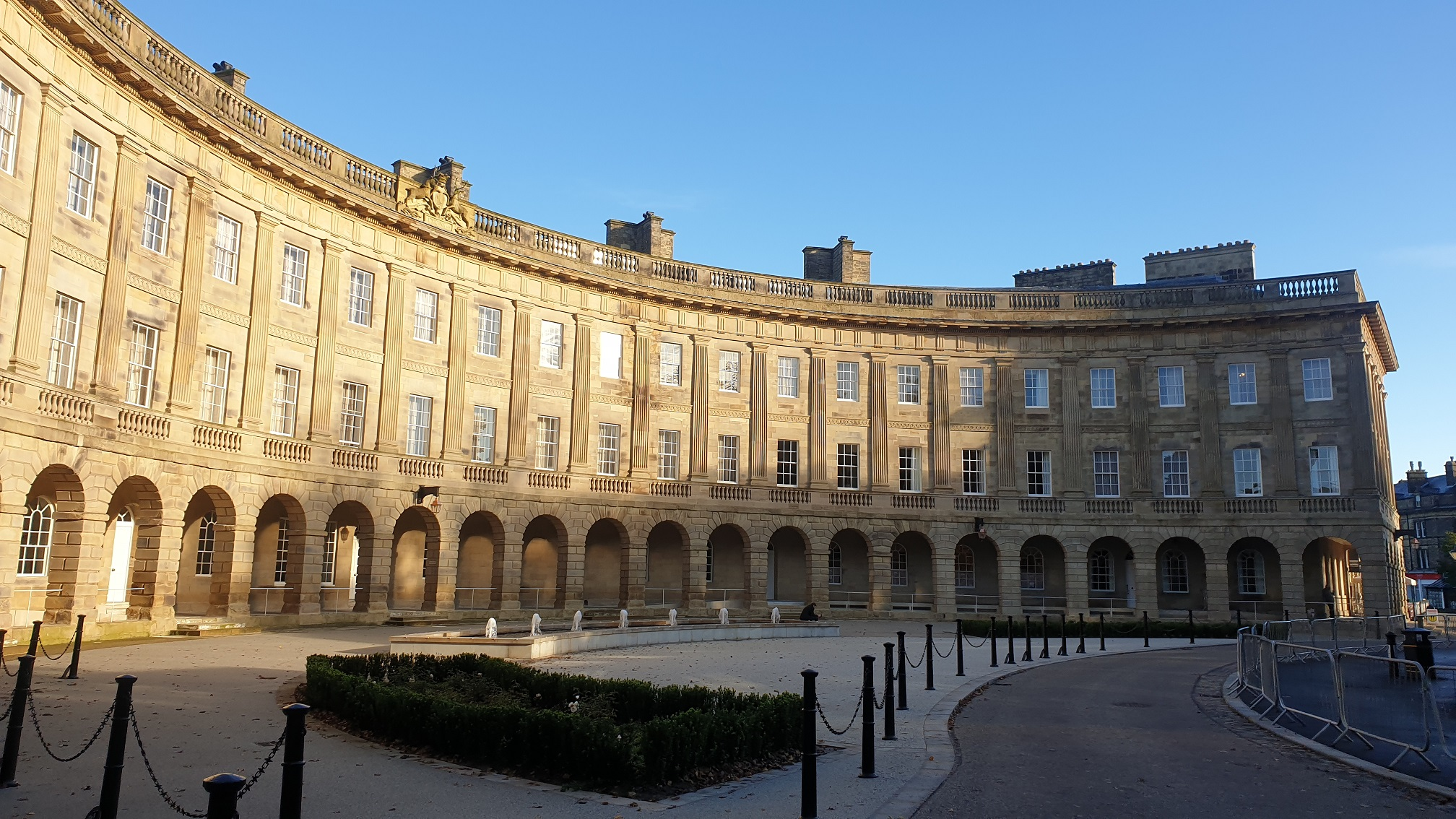
- The Crescent Hotel in 2020

- Location within Borough of High Peak
- Alternative names: The Crescent

General information
- Architectural style: Palladian
- Location: Buxton, Derbyshire, England
- Coordinates: 53°15′32″N 1°54′50″W
- Construction started: 1780
- Completed: 1789
- Client: Fifth Duke of Devonshire

Design and construction
- Architect: John Carr

Other information
- Number of rooms: 81

Listed Building – Grade I
- Official name: The Crescent
- Designated: 25 January 1951
- Reference no.: 1257876

Buxton Crescent is a Grade-I-listed building in the town of Buxton, Derbyshire, England. It owes much to the Royal Crescent in Bath, but has been described by the Royal Institution of British Architects as "more richly decorated and altogether more complex". It was designed by the architect John Carr of York, and built for the 5th Duke of Devonshire between 1780 and 1789. In 2020, following a multi-year restoration and redevelopment project supported by the National Heritage Memorial Fund and Derbyshire County Council, The Crescent was reopened as an 81-bedroom 5-star hotel, a spa, shops, and a visitor experience.

== Setting ==
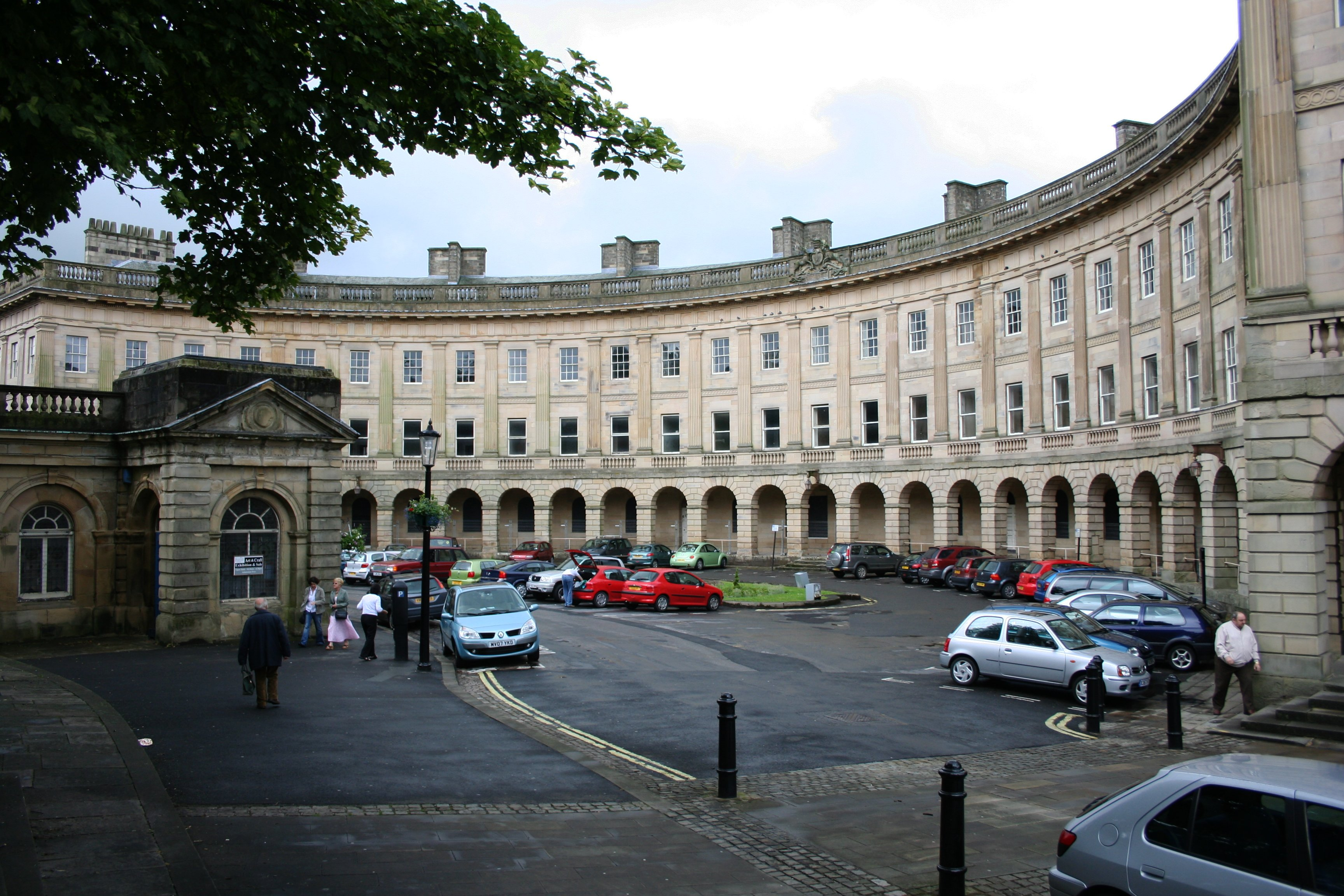
The Crescent with the Pump Room to the left in 2007

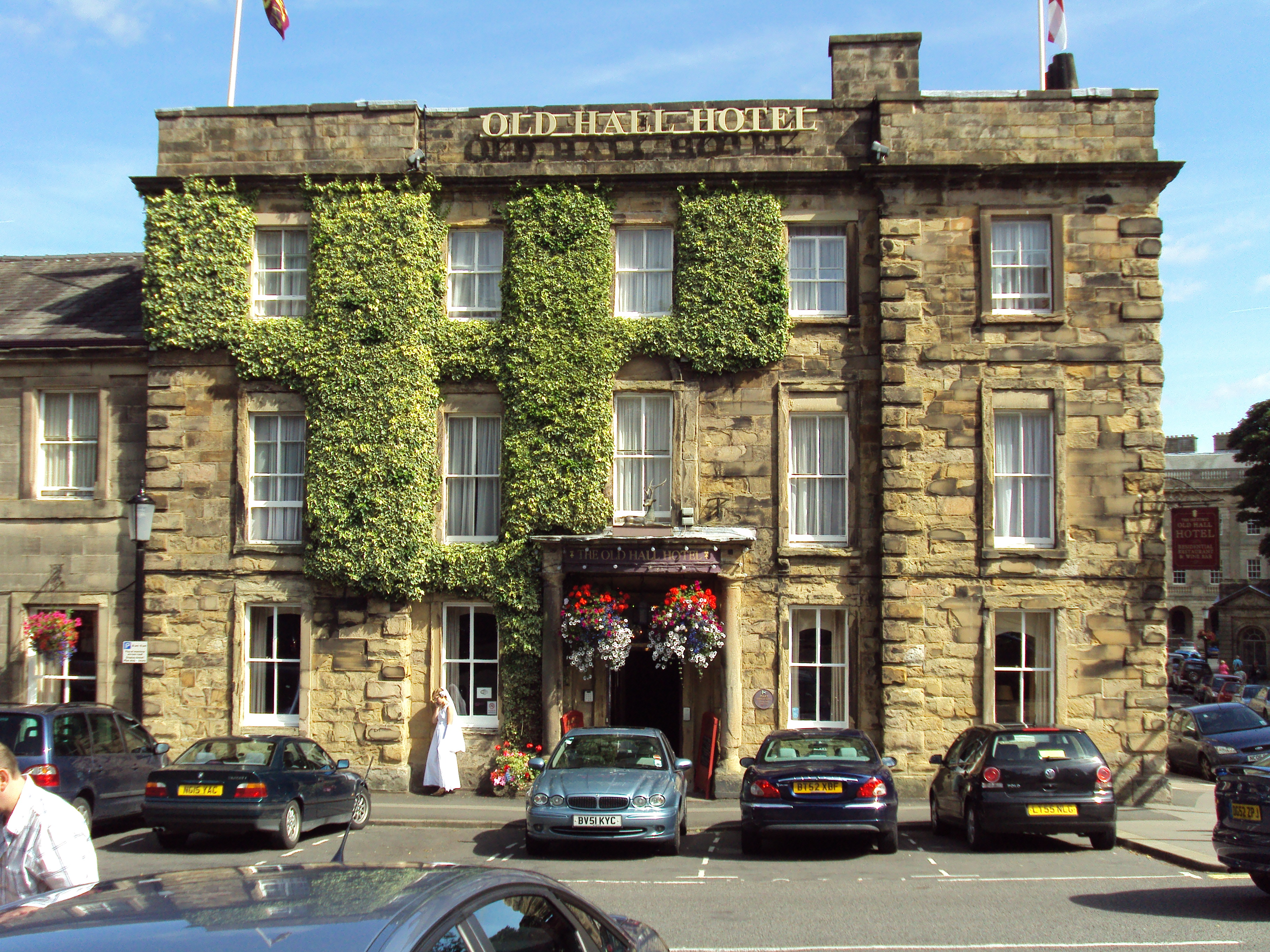
The Old Hall Hotel at the south-west end of the attached range of listed buildings

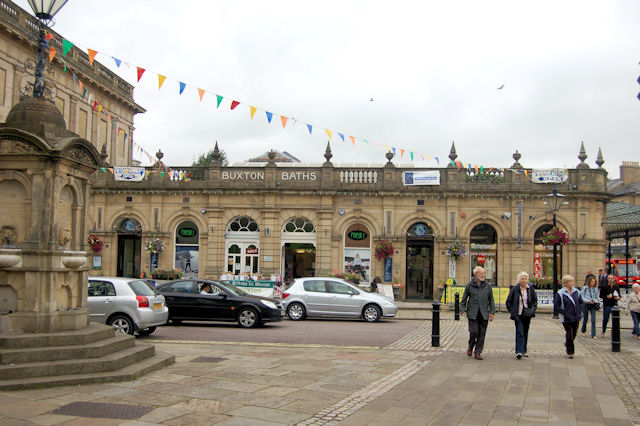
The Buxton Thermal Baths, now the Cavendish Arcade, at the east end of range, with The Colonnade at far right, and the side of the Crescent visible upper left

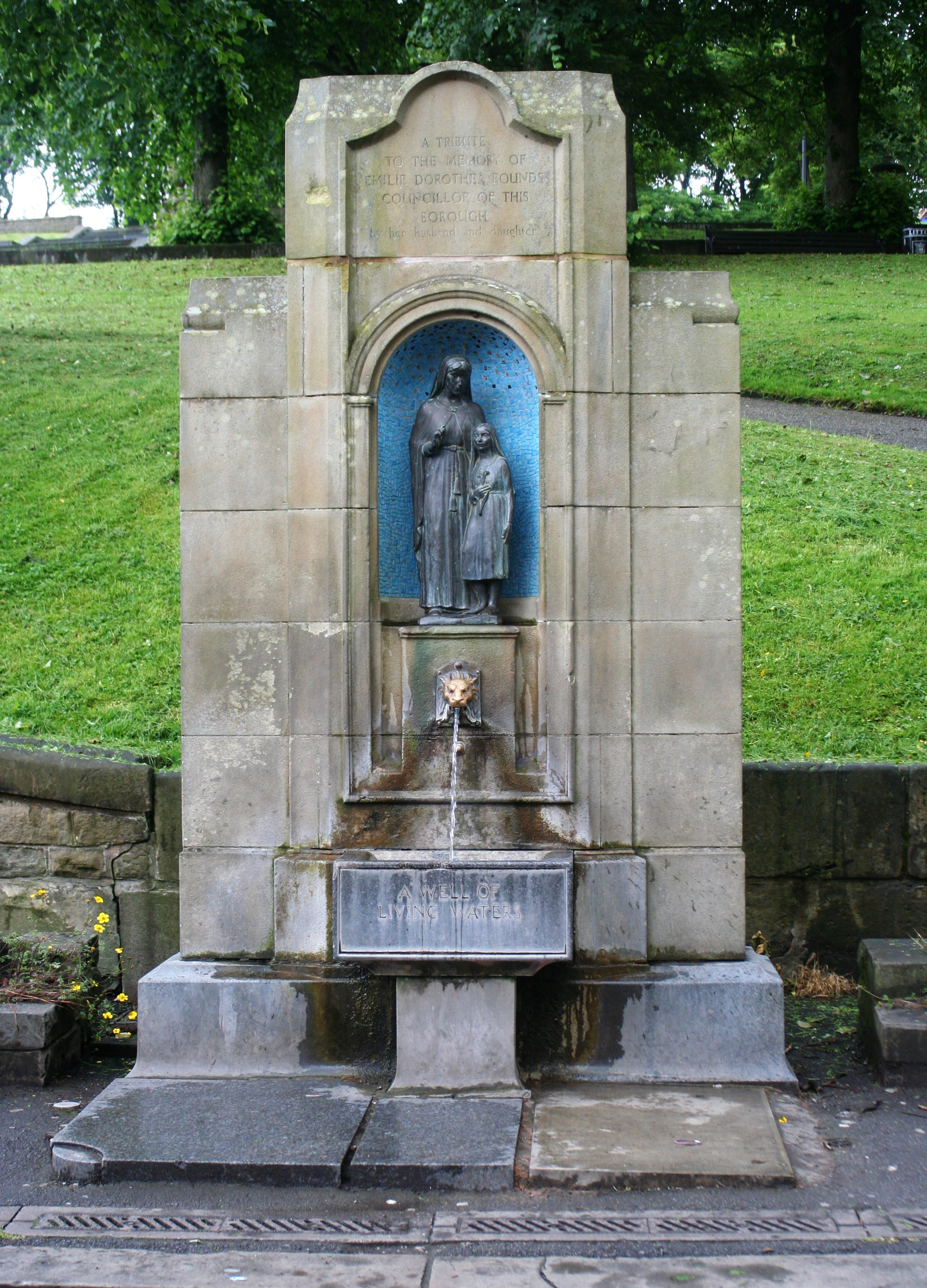
St Ann's Well

The Crescent faces the site of St Ann's Well, where warm spring water has flowed for thousands of years. The well is at the foot of The Slopes, a steep landscaped hillside in the centre of Buxton. Here the geological strata channel mineral water from a mile below ground, to emerge at a constant 27.5 °C (81.5 °F).

Originally detached, the Crescent is now the centrepiece of an attached range of significant Georgian architecture facing The Slopes, flanked on either side by the Grade-II-listed Buxton Baths, built by architect Henry Currey. To the west are the Natural Mineral Baths, built 1851–53; to the east are the Buxton Thermal Baths, built 1852–53. The Thermal Baths, closed in 1963 and at risk of demolition, underwent a major restoration led by conservation architects Latham & Company, with British artist Brian Clarke commissioned to contribute to the refurbishment; his scheme, designed in 1984 and completed in 1987, was for a modern stained-glass artwork to enclose the former baths, creating an atrial space for the Cavendish Arcade, a complex of covered, independent shops. At the time of its creation the largest stained-glass window in Britain, the landmark barrel-vaulted ceiling echoes the shape of the Crescent and adjacent Colonnade, a row of shops with a projecting canopy also by Currey. Across the forecourt of the Crescent, at the foot of The Slopes, are Currey's 1894 Pump Room; and the adjacent public drinking spout St Ann's Well, built c. 1940, the site of earlier wells dating back to the Roman period.

== Original construction and use ==
The Crescent was built for William Cavendish, the 5th Duke of Devonshire, as part of his scheme to establish Buxton as a fashionable Georgian spa town. The facade forms an arc of a circle facing south-east. It was built as a unified structure incorporating a hotel, five lodging houses, the Duke of Devonshire's town house and a grand assembly room with a fine painted ceiling. The cost was estimated at £38,601 which was largely funded by the Duke's copper mines in Ecton. The Assembly Rooms, which housed the Great Ballroom and a Card Room, became the social heart of 18th-century Buxton. Due to limited space at St Anne's Church, from 1788 until the construction of St John the Baptist Church, the Assembly Room would host Anglican Church Services.

On the ground floor arcade were shops (including a hair and wig-dresser, subscription library and newsroom, post office and "petrification shops" which sold solid ornaments crafted from local marble and Blue John) and kitchens were in the basement. The Great Stables were built in the 1780s (also designed by John Carr for the 5th Duke of Devonshire) to stable up to 120 horses of the guests of the Crescent. A huge central dome was later added and the building is now known as the Devonshire Dome. As a result of these improvements to the town, in combination with the French Revolution making it harder for British subjects to partake in European tourism, Buxton would become popular with tourists throughout the 1790s and the following decades.

== Subsequent history ==
Over time, St. Ann's Hotel at the western end of the Crescent, and the Great Hotel, incorporating the Assembly Rooms at the eastern end, took over the intervening lodging houses in the centre of the building. Between 1804 and 1806 a third hotel was established known as the Central Hotel which was formerly the Duke's town house, which would close c. 1830 before being merged into the other two hotels. During the Luddite rebellion in 1812, Lieutenant-General Sir Thomas Maitland based his headquarters in Buxton's Great Hotel to quell rebellions in nearby Lancashire and Yorkshire. By 1840, the demand for the Assembly Rooms had declined due to the diminishing popularity of English spas, and the Ballroom became a Dining Room for the Great Hotel. In 1878, the Great Hotel would reopen as the Crescent Hotel.

=== Twentieth century ===
The eastern end would become a rheumatic clinic known as "the Buxton Clinic" in 1935, which became an annexe the Devonshire Royal Hospital and joined the National Health Service with its establishment in 1948. In 1966, the clinic would close before moving to a new facility at the Cavendish Hospital on Manchester Road. In 1970, it would be acquired by the Derbyshire County Council and from 1970 to 1973, it would undergo expensive renovations before reopening as council offices and a public library.

The western end continued operating as the St Ann's Hotel, which closed in 1989 due to the high cost of necessary repairs and hygiene breaches. Gales in 1990 would rip off the roof of the St. Ann's Hotel, leaving it exposed to the elements and requiring urgent repairs by the council. The whole building was closed when major structural problems were discovered in the Assembly Rooms, and by 1992 lay empty. After concern about falling masonry, the building would be fenced off in the summer of 1993. In August 1993, the St Ann's Hotel was sold by the Bank of Egypt who owned the mortgage to a newly formed company called Capitalrise.

== Restoration and re-opening ==
The St Ann's Hotel was bought from Capitalrise by the High Peak Borough Council for £180,000 in August 1993 after 18 months of protracted negotiations under a Compulsory purchase order from Peter Brooke, Baron Brooke of Sutton Mandeville, the Secretary of State for National Heritage, which was the first time a Compulsory Purchase Order had been served on a listed building by a Secretary of State instead of a Local planning authority, at which time the whole building fell into public ownership as a result of 'lack of any significant progress' on repairs. The High Peak Borough Council purchased the St Ann's to act as a temporary caretaker of the building until a suitable buyer could be found. A further £1.5 million from English Heritage was used to make the building weathertight.

The Crescent, Pump Rooms and Natural Baths buildings were then jointly marketed by the borough and county councils. In 1994 the Monumental Trust proposed a scheme to convert the Crescent into flats; however, no funding was found. In December 2000 the combined councils applied to the Heritage Lottery Fund to help finance plans to restore the Crescent as a hotel and to build new spa facilities. Funding was approved in July 2003.

Work to restore, redevelop and manage the hotel and spa was put out to tender, which was won in December 2003 by a partnership of the Trevor Osborne Property Group Limited and CP Holdings Limited, the parent company of the spa hotel specialists Danubius Hotels Group. The then £23 million plan was scheduled for completion in 2007.

The project suffered a series of delays, including funding and technical and legal issues relating to the continued supply of water from springs beneath the buildings to Nestlé, the bottler of Buxton Water, and it was not until April 2012 that an agreement between the joint councils and the developer to start the first phase of the project could be signed. Phase one work on the then £35 million project for a 79-bedroom 5-star hotel, natural baths, a visitor interpretation centre, a thermal mineral water spa and specialist shops commenced in the summer of 2012. Funding problems delayed the main part of project further, but with a loan guarantee from Derbyshire County Council of £11.4 million and an additional grant of £11.3 million from the Heritage Lottery Fund announced in 2014, work resumed in 2015. In October 2018, with the project still incomplete, Derbyshire County Council agreed to invest a further £5.7 million, with the total project cost rising to £68.4 million. The total funds provided by DCC to the project are around £13.5 million.

In 2019 it was announced that the hotel would be opening in May 2020 under the Ensana brand; however, works to prepare the hotel for opening were further delayed during the 2020 COVID-19 pandemic in the United Kingdom. In October 2020 Ensana reopened the hotel following the 17-year-long refurbishment, and the Buxton Crescent Heritage Trust opened the interactive Buxton Crescent Experience inside the building which allows visitors to learn about the story of both Buxton and the Crescent through exhibition rooms and Virtual reality.

The bulk of works for the restoration and refurbishment project were completed between 2015 and 2020. The lead architect was John Alexander Ferguson of the design company, Curious. The main contractor was Vinci. The M&E Engineer was DB3. The Structural Engineers were Mike West and Neil Kirman of AECOM. The conservation consultant was Chris Hesketh. During the restoration works, the designers and builders hid a time capsule within the building, waiting to be discovered by future generations.

In September 2024, following a default on repayments of the loan to Derbyshire County Council, Ensana Hotels announced that they had put the Crescent up for sale, along with the adjoining Old Hall Hotel. In November 2025 it was announced that both hotels had been acquired by the Champneys spa resort and hotel group. On 5 December 2025, former England Footballer David Seaman cut the ribbon to mark the handover of the hotel to Champneys.

The Buxton Crescent Heritage Trust manages access to the Assembly Rooms for 60 days of the year, holding free open days throughout the year, as well as hosting a range of historical events and exhibitions such as Buxton's Georgian Festival. The Crescent is also home to a florist and an art gallery.

== See also ==
- Grade I listed buildings in Derbyshire
- Listed buildings in Buxton
