= Derbyshire Community Health Services NHS Foundation Trust =

NHS Health trust in England

- Former name: Derbyshire Community Health Services NHS Trust
- Established: 1 April 2011
- Headquarters: Ashgate Road, Ashgate, Chesterfield, Derbyshire, S42 7JE
- Region served: Derbyshire
- Budget: £200 million
- Hospitals: Ashgreen Learning Disability Centre; Babington Hospital; Buxton Hospital; Cavendish Hospital; Clay Cross Hospital; Florence Nightingale Community Hospital; Ilkeston Community Hospital; Ripley Community Hospital; St Oswald's Hospital; Walton Hospital; Whitworth Hospital
- Chair: Julie Houlder
- Chief executive: Jim Austin
- Staff: 4,554
- Website: www.dchs.nhs.uk

Derbyshire Community Health Services NHS Foundation Trust (DCHS) is a community health trust providing community care and specialised services to patients across Derbyshire.

== History ==
The Derbyshire Community Health Services NHS Trust was established on 1 April 2011. It was authorised as a foundation trust in October 2014.

The trust has established a Responsive Workforce Model using HealthRoster Software and SafeCare, which they say has reduced agency spend, ensured quality and freed up nurses for hands-on care.

It was named by the Health Service Journal as the second-best community trust to work for in 2015. At that time it had 3227 full-time equivalent staff and a sickness absence rate of 4.13%. 78% of staff recommend it as a place for treatment and 65% recommended it as a place to work.

The trust announced plans to merge with Derbyshire Healthcare NHS Foundation Trust in November 2016, but the planned merger did not occur and the two trusts continue in existence.

In September 2019, The Trust was rated 'outstanding' overall by the Care Quality Commission following inspections of the care provided.

In 2022 work started on a new health hub, on Baslow Road, Bakewell which will provide facilities for community health services and an ambulance service base, replacing the 19th century Newholme Hospital. It will have 10 consultation rooms and four treatment rooms, a children's area, group room, office space, large waiting area, baby feeding and changing rooms, toilets and reception.

== Services ==
The Trust provides services at multiple sites including 10 community hospitals and 28 health centres, serving a population of over 1 million. Some of the services provided by the Trust include:

- Community nursing and therapy
- Health Visitors
- Learning Disability Support
- Occupational therapy
- Older Persons' Mental Health care
- Sexual Health
- Urgent Care Centres

== See also ==
- List of NHS trusts
