= Ilkeston Community Hospital =

- Derbyshire Community Health Services NHS Foundation Trust
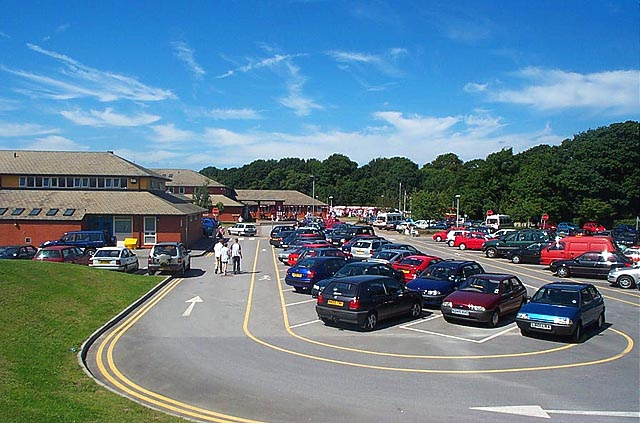
- Ilkeston Community Hospital

- Location in Derbyshire

Geography
- Location: Heanor Road, Ilkeston, Derbyshire, England
- Coordinates: 52.9881°N 1.3207°W

Organisation
- Care system: NHS
- Type: Community

History
- Founded: 1987

Links
- Website: www.dchs.nhs.uk

Ilkeston Community Hospital is a healthcare facility at Heanor Road, Ilkeston in Derbyshire, England.

== History ==
The facility has its origins in a cottage hospital established in Station Road in August 1884. The hospital moved to a new purpose-built facility which was opened at 99-109 Heanor Road by Lord Belper in March 1894. The hospital joined the National Health Service in 1948 and, after it became dilapidated, a new facility was built further north on the Heanor Road in 1987: the new facility was opened by Diana, Princess of Wales in December 1987.
