= Cavendish Hospital =

- Derbyshire Community Health Services NHS Foundation Trust
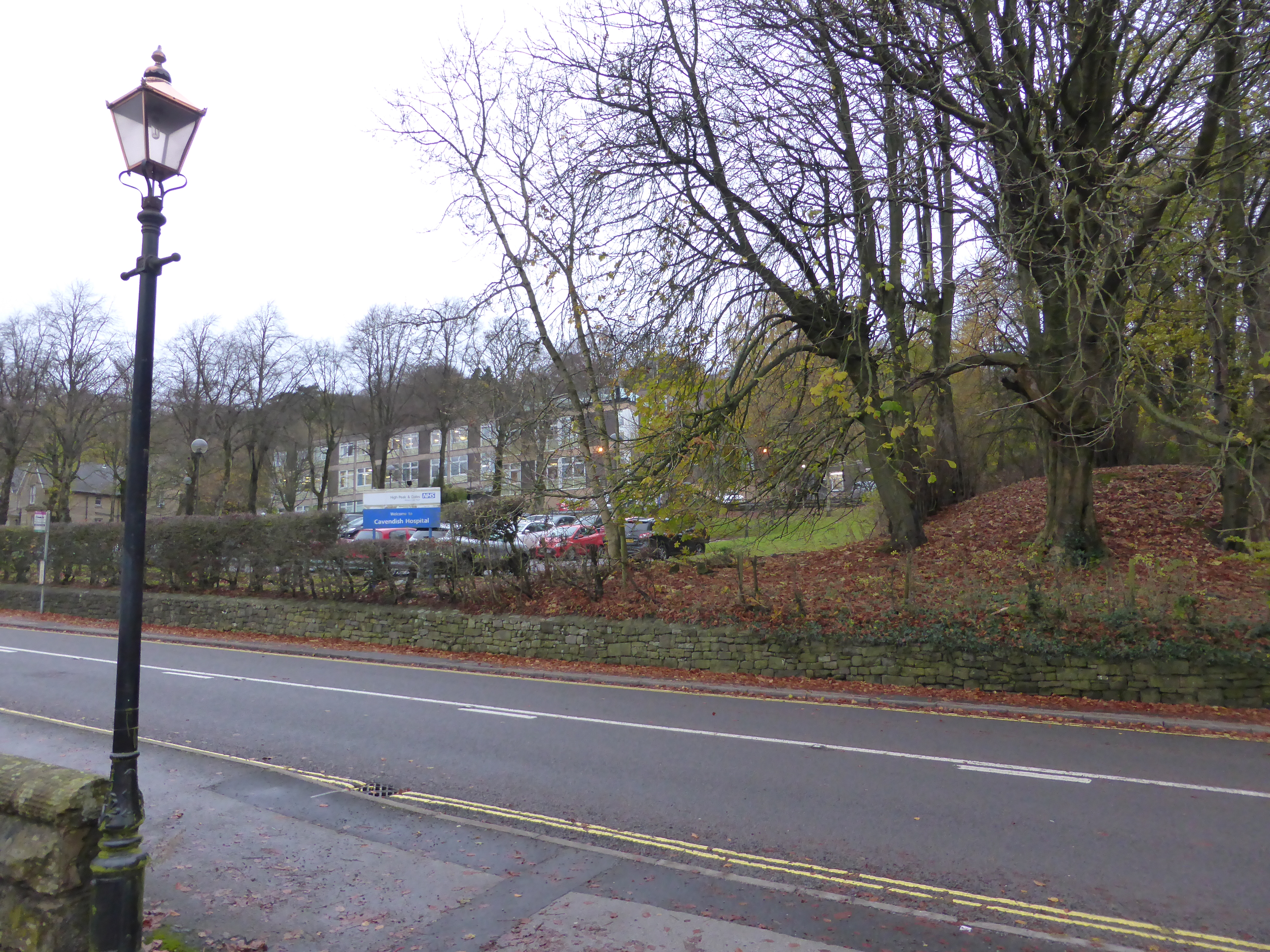
- Cavendish Hospital

- Location in the Borough of High Peak

Geography
- Location: Manchester Road, Buxton, Derbyshire, England
- Coordinates: 53.2624°N 1.9211°W

Organisation
- Care system: NHS
- Type: Geriatric

History
- Founded: 1966

Links
- Website: www.dchs.nhs.uk

Cavendish Hospital is a geriatric healthcare facility in Manchester Road, Buxton, Derbyshire. It is managed by Derbyshire Community Health Services NHS Foundation Trust.

== History ==
The hospital has its origins in the Buxton Clinic, a geriatric facility established in Buxton Crescent in 1935. The clinic became the geriatric wing of the Devonshire Royal Hospital in 1948 and then moved to a completely new facility at Manchester Road in 1966. In July 2017, the North Derbyshire Clinical Commissioning Group announced the closure of 18 beds at the hospital. Local member of parliament Ruth George raised concerns about the matter with Philip Dunne, health minister, during a debate on health in the House of Commons in October 2017.
