= Ashbourne Green =

Coordinates: 53.030°N 1.712°W

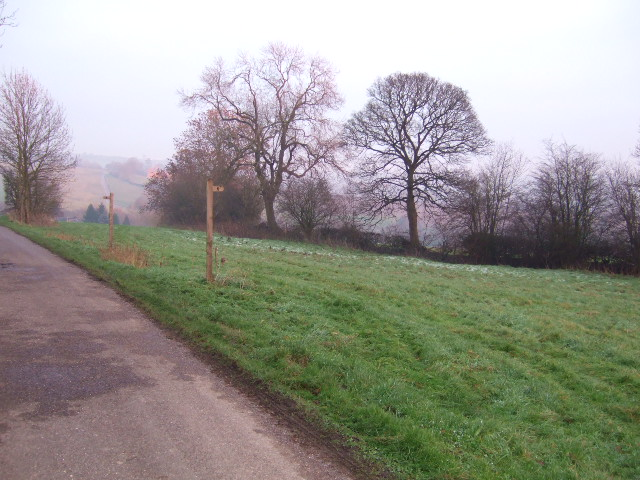
- Ashbourne Green.

- Location within Derbyshire
- OS grid reference: SK194481
- Civil parish: Offcote and Underwood
- District: Derbyshire Dales
- Shire county: Derbyshire
- Region: East Midlands
- Country: England
- Sovereign state: United Kingdom
- Post town: ASHBOURNE
- Postcode district: DE6
- Police: Derbyshire
- Fire: Derbyshire
- Ambulance: East Midlands

Ashbourne Green is an area of Derbyshire, England. It is located in the Peak District, 1 mile north-east of Ashbourne in the Offcote and Underwood parish.

The owner of The Green Hall residence in Ashbourne has traditionally held the freehold of Ashbourne Green, which is around 46 acres of common land.
