= Buxton Hospital =

- Derbyshire Community Health Services NHS Foundation Trust
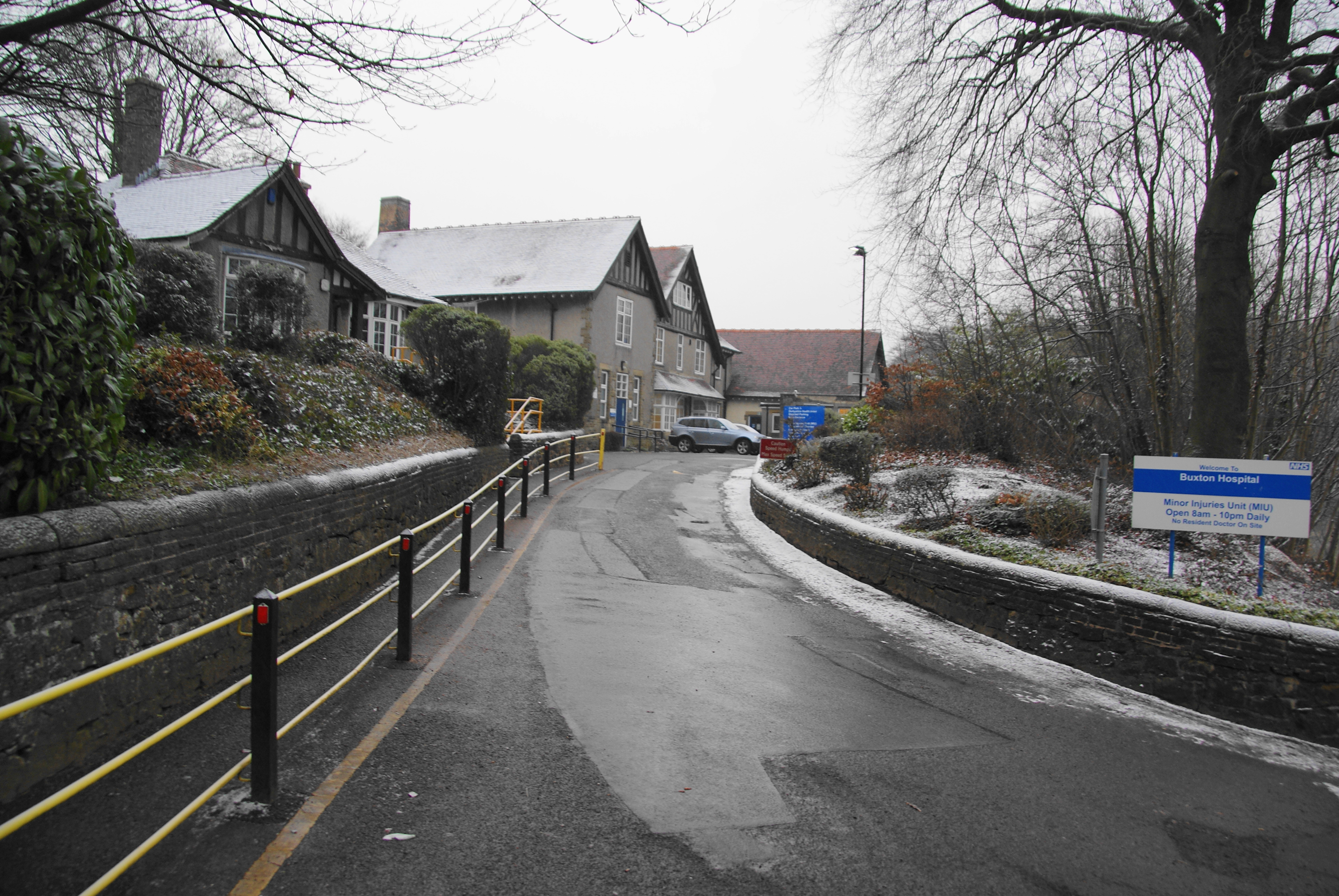
- Buxton Hospital

- Shown in the Borough of High Peak

Geography
- Location: Buxton, Derbyshire, England
- Coordinates: 53.2481°N 1.9088°W

Organisation
- Care system: NHS
- Type: Cottage hospital

History
- Founded: 1912; 114 years ago

Links
- Website: dchs.nhs.uk
- Lists: Hospitals in England

Buxton Hospital is a cottage hospital in Buxton, Derbyshire. It is managed by Derbyshire Community Health Services NHS Foundation Trust.

== History ==
The foundation stone for the cottage hospital was laid by the Duke of Devonshire in June 1911. He returned to open the facility as Buxton Cottage Hospital in 1912. It became Buxton and District Hospital in 1930 and then joined the National Health Service as Buxton Hospital in 1948. The hospital has a minor injuries unit which cut back its opening hours due to staff shortages in April 2011 but then reverted to normal hours in August 2011. The minor injuries unit was relaunched as an 'urgent treatment centre' in 2020.
