= Adeline Sergeant =

English writer (1851–1904)

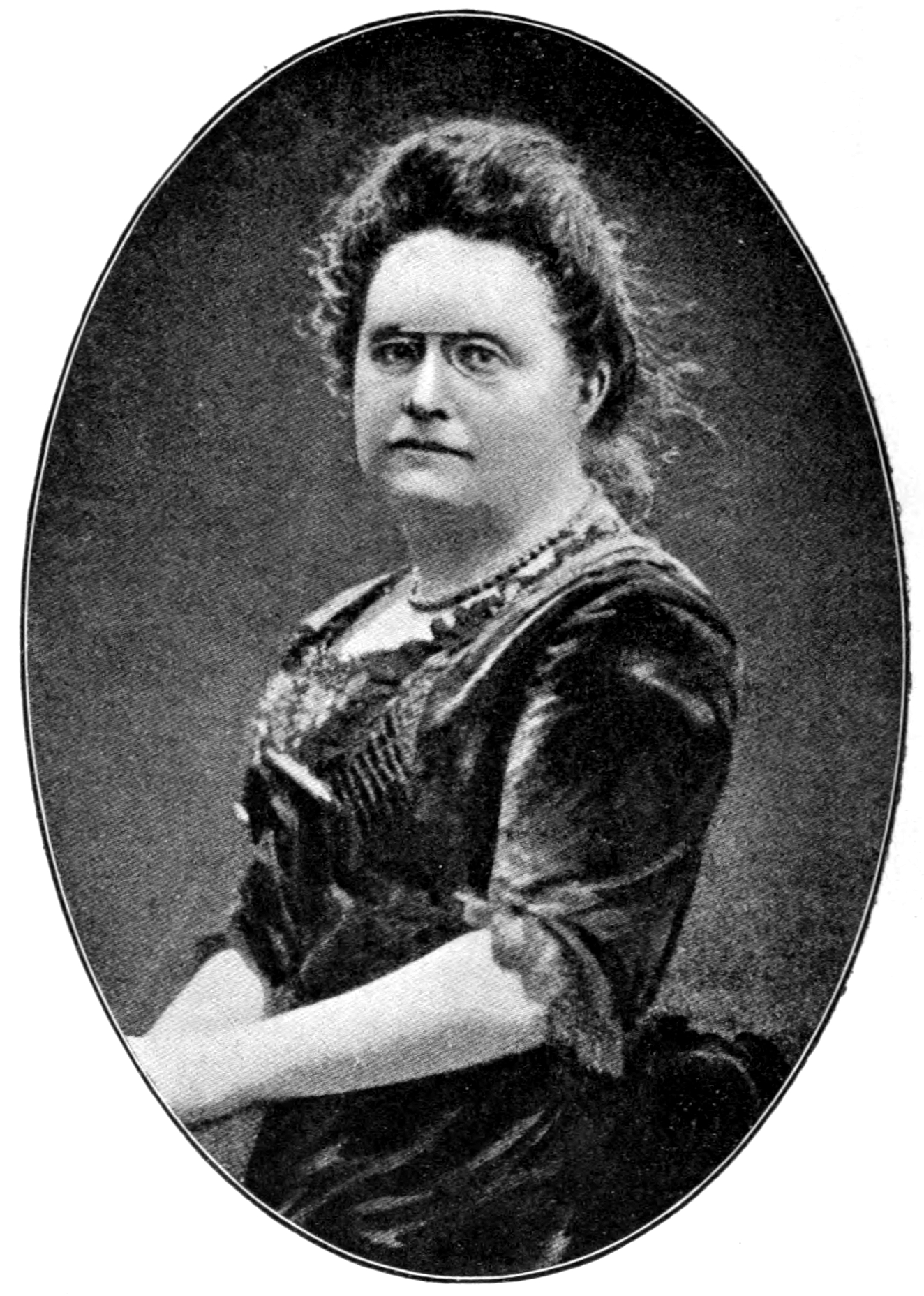
- Born: Emily Frances Adeline Sergeant; 4 July 1851; Ashbourne
- Died: 4 December 1904; Bournemouth
- Education: Queen's College
- Occupations: Writer, poet, novelist

Adeline Sergeant (4 July 1851 – 4 December 1904) was a prolific English writer of the Victorian era. She wrote over ninety novels during her lifetime, including Jacobi's Wife.

== Early life and education ==
Born Emily Frances Adeline Sergeant at Ashbourne, Derbyshire, the second daughter of Richard Sergeant and Jane (Hall), Adeline Sergeant was home schooled until the age of thirteen, when she began attending school in Weston-super-Mare. Her mother was a writer of children's literature that she published under the pen names 'Adeline' or 'Adeline Hall.' Apart from her first book, which appeared under her initials, Sergeant's signed work all seems to have appeared under her preferred form of name, Adeline Sergeant. At fifteen a collection of Sergeant's Poems, with a short introduction by her mother, were published in a volume that received positive notice in Wesleyan periodicals. She won a scholarship to attend Queen's College, London. Her father died in 1870, and for several years she worked as a governess at Riverhead, Kent.

== Literary career ==
One of Sergeant's first major published works for an adult audience appears to be a translation of the novel The Chase; a tale of the Southern States, from the French of Jules Lermina (London: J.C. Nimmo & Bain, 1880). In 1882 her novel Jacobi's Wife earned an award of £100, and the work was published serially by The People's Friend (Dundee). It appeared in other newspapers as well, and on the conclusion of the serialisation in London in 1887 as a three volume novel. For the next several years her writings were serialized in this Dundee publication, where she lived from 1885 to 1887.

In 1888 Sergeant sold A Dead Man's Trust to W. C. Leng and Co., which ran a newspaper syndication service based in Sheffield. The story appeared in several British and Australian newspapers, but does not appear to have been published separately as a book under this title. Sometime later, Tillotson's Fiction Bureau, a rival operation based in Bolton, Lancashire, offered Sergeant a five-year contract to produce a full-length serial and a short story totalling around 160,000 words annually, for which she was paid £162 per annum. Around this time, Sergeant moved to Bloomsbury, London, where she earned enough to support herself through her writings.

In the late 1880s, Sergeant developed an interest in Fabianism and the plight of the poor in London. Over her literary career, she produced over ninety novels; with some involving a religious theme. Her religious views evolved over time, including a period in the 1880s when she was briefly agnostic. Finally, she converted to Catholicism at the end of the century. Adeline Sergeant served as literary adviser to the publishing company R. Bentley & Sons. She frequently travelled abroad, making trips to Egypt and Palestine. In 1901 she moved to Bournemouth, where she died in 1904. A biography of Adeline Sergeant appeared the following year.

== Bibliography ==
- Poems (1866)
- Dicky and His Friends(1879)
- Una's Crusade, and other tales (1880)
- My Nelly's Story, and Halliday's Lads (1881)
- Beyond Recall (1882)
- Jacobi's Wife (1882)
- An Open Foe. A romance (1884)
- No Saint (1886)
- Roy's Repentance (1888)
- Seventy Times Seven (1888)
- Deveril's Diamond (1889)
- A Life Sentence (1889)
- The Luck of the House (1889)
- Esther Denison (1889)
- Name and Fame (1890)
- A True Friend (1890)
- Little Miss Colwyn (1890)
- Brooke's daughter (1891)
- Sir Anthony (1892)
- Christine (1892)
- The Story of a Penitent Soul (1892)
- Under False Pretences (1892)
- An East London Mystery (1892)
- A Broken Idol (1893)
- In Vallombrosa (1894)
- The Surrender of Margaret Bellarmine. A fragment (1894)
- St. Maur (1894)
- Christine (1894)
- Dr. Endicott's Experiment (1894)
- The Mistress of Quest (1895)
- Out of Due Season : a mezzotint (1895)
- Marjory's Mistake (1895)
- Kitty Holden (1895)
- No Ambition (1895)
- A Deadly Foe (1895)
- Erica's Husband (1896)
- The Failure of Sibyl Fletcher (1896)
- Roger Vanbrugh's Wife (1896)
- Told in the Twilight (1896)
- A Rogue's Daughter (1896)
- In the Wilderness (1896)
- In Vallombrosa (1897)
- The Claim of Anthony Lockhart (1897)
- The Idol-Maker (1897)
- The Lady Charlotte (1897)
- Marjory Moore's Lovers (1897)
- A Valuable Life (1898)
- Miss Betty's Mistake (1898)
- Margaret Wynne (1898)
- The Story of Phil Enderby (1898)
- Blake of Oriel (1899)
- The Love Story of Margaret Wynne (1899)
- The Common Lot (1899)
- The Conscience of Gilbert Pollard (1900)
- A Rise in the World (1900)
- Miss Cleveland's Companion (1901)
- A Great Lady (1901)
- My Lady's Diamonds (1901)
- Sylvia's Ambition (1901)
- This Body of Death (1901)
- Daunay's tower (1901)
- The Treasure of Captain Scarlett (1901)
- The Marriage of Lydia Mainwaring (1902)
- A Soul Apart (1902)
- Barbara's Money (1902)
- The Master of Beechwood (1902)
- The Mission of Margaret, and other stories (1902)
- Anthea's way (1903)
- Beneath the Veil (1903)
- Alison's Ordeal. A story for girls (1903)
- Cynthia's Ideal (1903)
- The Love that Overcame (1903)
- The Progress of Rachel (1904)
- The Yellow Diamond (1904)
- Accused and Accuser (1904)
- Dicky and His Friends (1904)
- Nellie Maturin's Victory (1905), posthumous
- The Sixth Sense (1905), posthumous
- The Missing Elizabeth (1905), posthumous
- An Independent Maiden (1906), posthumous
- An Impetuous Girl (1906), posthumous
- The Quest of Geoffrey Darrell (1907), posthumous
- The House in the Crescent (1907), posthumous
- The Passion of Paul Marillier (1908), posthumous
- May's Cousin (1909), posthumous
- My Lady's Diamonds (1913), posthumous
