= Clifton, Derbyshire =

Village in Derbyshire, England

Clifton
- Location within Derbyshire
- Population: 500 (2011)
- OS grid reference: SK165448
- Civil parish: Clifton and Compton
- District: Derbyshire Dales
- Shire county: Derbyshire
- Region: East Midlands
- Country: England
- Sovereign state: United Kingdom
- Post town: ASHBOURNE
- Postcode district: DE6
- Police: Derbyshire
- Fire: Derbyshire
- Ambulance: East Midlands

Clifton is a village in the Derbyshire Dales district of Derbyshire, England. The village is situated about 1.2 miles (2 km) south west of Ashbourne, and is close to the border with Staffordshire. The appropriate civil parish is called Clifton and Compton. The population of this civil parish at the 2011 Census was 500.

== History and notable buildings ==
Margery Bower is a round barrow assumed to date from the Bronze Age. It lies on the southern side of the village on the road to Snelston.

Clifton Hall was built in the late 18th century, altered in the 19th and 20th centuries. It stands close to the centre of the village on Chapel Lane at 52.9995°N 1.7533°W.

Holy Trinity church was designed by Henry Isaac Stevens of Derby, and built in 1845. Opposite the church stands the Cock Inn public house.

The village formerly had a railway station, opened in 1852 as Clifton and renamed in 1893 as Clifton (Mayfield), on a branch of the North Staffordshire Railway between Rocester and Ashbourne. Passenger services ended in 1954 with the line closing for freight services in 1964.

== Local facilities ==
Education and recreational facilities in and around the village include:

- Clifton Primary School
- Clifton recreation ground
- Clifton Cricket club
- Ashbourne Golf Course

In March 2014, the village was noted in media as the first site for the 'Speedy Shop', an automated retailing solution for small communities designed and manufactured locally. The shop provides a wide range of supplies to the village using a unique automated machine styled like a traditional village store. It was the invention of local entrepreneur Peter Fox and colleague Dave Russell.

== Role in Ashbourne shrovetide football ==
At the site of the old corn mill lies a stone which acts as the Down'ards goal in the annual traditional Royal Shrovetide Football match. There are two adjacent stone markers, the old and the new.

== See also ==
- Listed buildings in Clifton and Compton

== Gallery ==
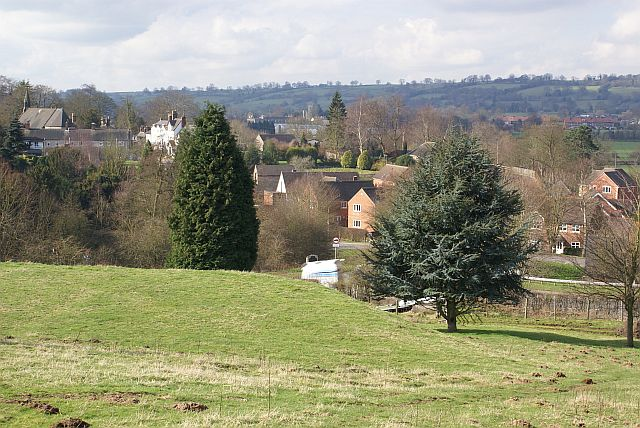
The village

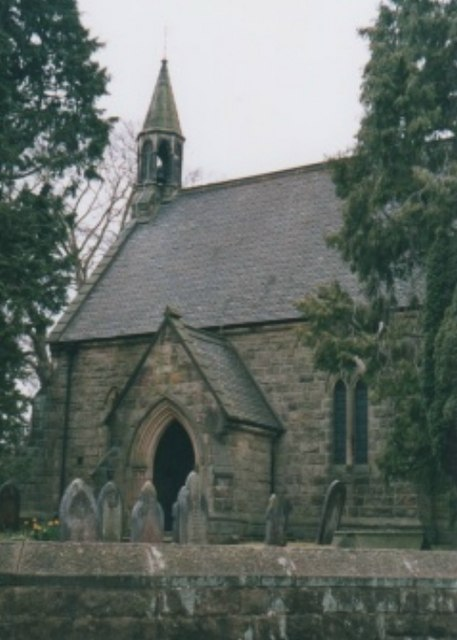
Clifton Church

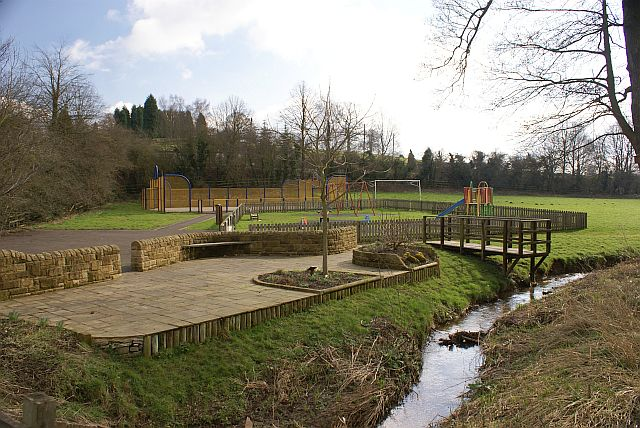
Clifton recreation ground

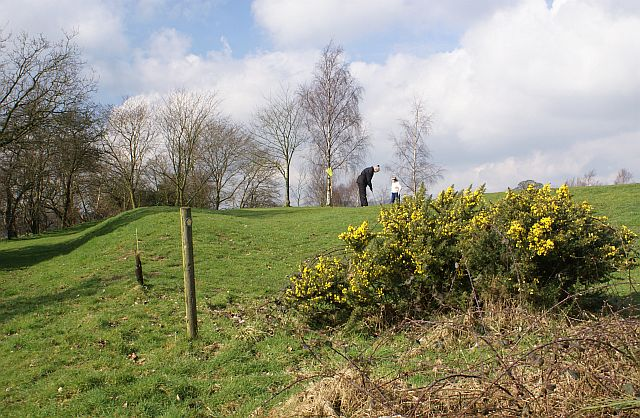
Ashbourne Golf Course, near Clifton

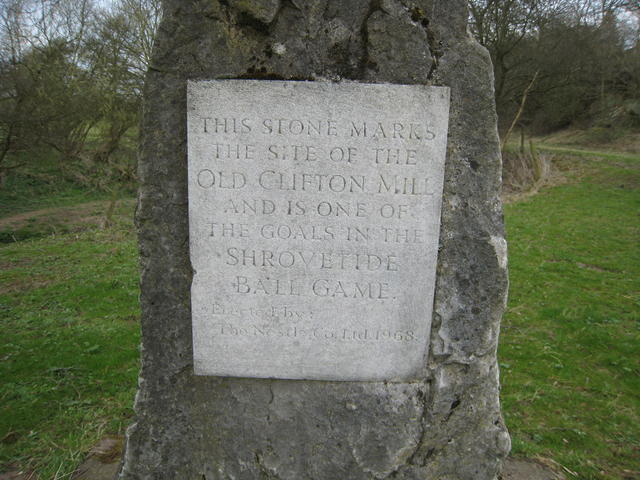
Plaque on the Clifton Goal

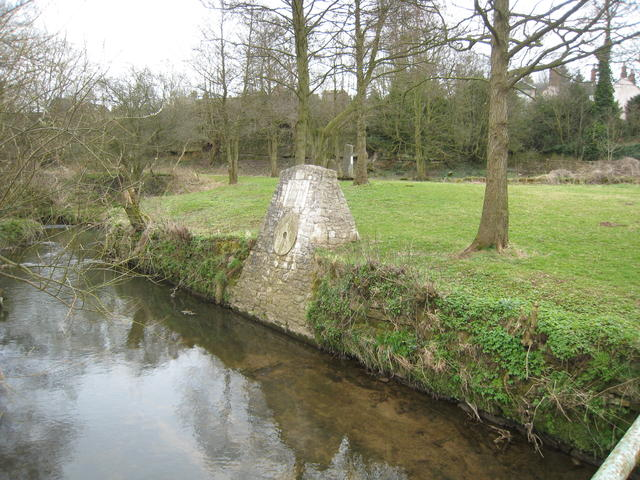
The "New" Clifton Goal
