= George Hayne =

English businessman (died 1723)

George Hayne (died 1723) was an English merchant and entrepreneur who was responsible for the creation of the Trent Navigation in England and hence the development of Burton upon Trent as the pre-eminent beer brewing and exporting town.

Hayne was the son of John and Elizabeth Hayne of Ashbourne Green at Ashbourne, Derbyshire, and was originally a merchant at Wirksworth. In 1711, he obtained the lease of rights to undertake the Trent Navigation from Lord Paget. Paget had revived a scheme to make the River Trent navigable between Burton and Wilden Ferry, in Castle Donington. Paget was named as undertaker in the River Trent Navigation Act 1698 (10 Will. 3. c. 26), which empowered a toll of up to three pence per ton and authorised a levy of £600 from the inhabitants of Burton, but by 1711 had made little progress.

Hayne was to pay £10 a year for the 31-year lease and went into partnership with Leonard Fosbrooke, a carrier based at Wilden Ferry. He set about quickly creating and opening the navigation and by 1713 had built a warehouse near Burton Bridge. He leased part of Burton Abbey to construct a wharf and extended the navigation to there.

The Trent navigation was opened for general merchandise and trade, giving a direct navigation route for large boats to Kingston upon Hull on the east coast and onwards by the coastal route to London and across the North Sea to countries bordering the Baltic Sea. The opportunities provided by a relatively gentle way of transporting of bottles of ale, were not missed by the brewers of Burton whose ale already had a high reputation. The earliest commercial breweries were set up in the High Street and Horninglow Street specifically to be near the river. An extensive timber trade also developed using the boats returning from the Baltic.

Hayne, with his partner, operated the navigation as a strongly defended monopoly, causing discontent among merchants and encouraging interloping. He died in 1723 and the lease, and the navigation rights passed to his brother Henry and business was continued as the "Burton Boat Company". After the opening of the Trent and Mersey Canal and the Napoleonic blockade of Continental trade the Boat Company were unable to compete and closed the navigation in 1805.
