= St Oswald's Hospital =

- Derbyshire Community Health Services NHS Foundation Trust
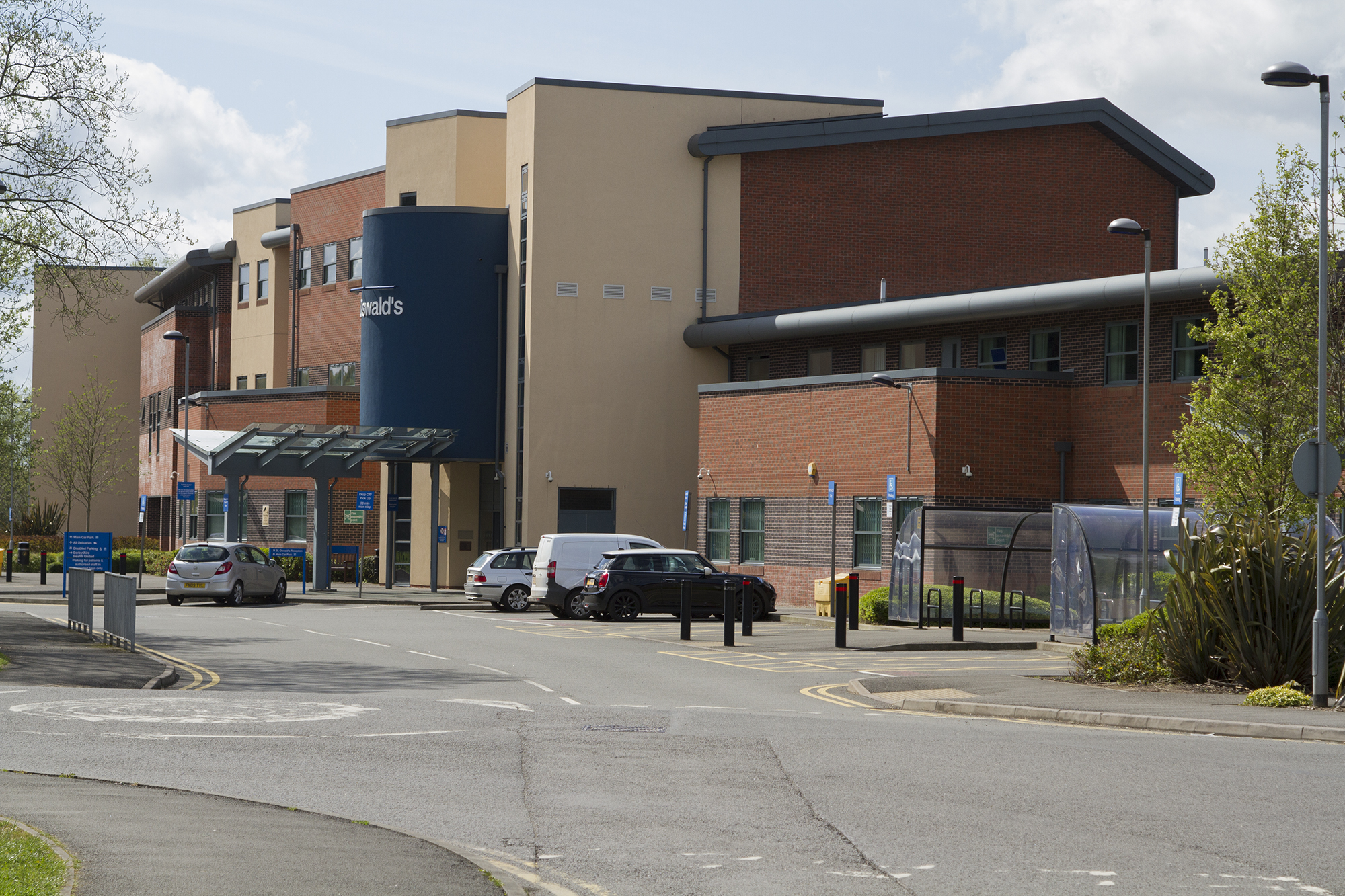
- St Oswald's Hospital

- Location in Derbyshire

Geography
- Location: Clifton Road, Ashbourne DE6 1DR, Derbyshire, England
- Coordinates: 53.0133°N 1.7391°W

Organisation
- Care system: NHS
- Type: Community

History
- Founded: 1848

Links
- Website: www.dchs.nhs.uk

St Oswald's Hospital is a healthcare facility on Clifton Road in Ashbourne, Derbyshire, England. It is managed by Derbyshire Community Health Services NHS Foundation Trust.

== History ==
The facility has its origins in the Ashbourne Union Workhouse which was located in Belle Vue Road and was completed in 1848. It became the Ashbourne Public Assistance Institution in 1930 and joined the National Health Service as St Oswald's Hospital in 1948. After the old hospital became dilapidated, a site on Clifton Road, just a few hundred yards south, was acquired and a modern facility was built and opened as the new St Oswald's Hospital in October 2010.
