= Ashbourne, Derbyshire =

Market town in Derbyshire, England

Coordinates: 53.016°N 1.731°W

Ashbourne
- Town and civil parish
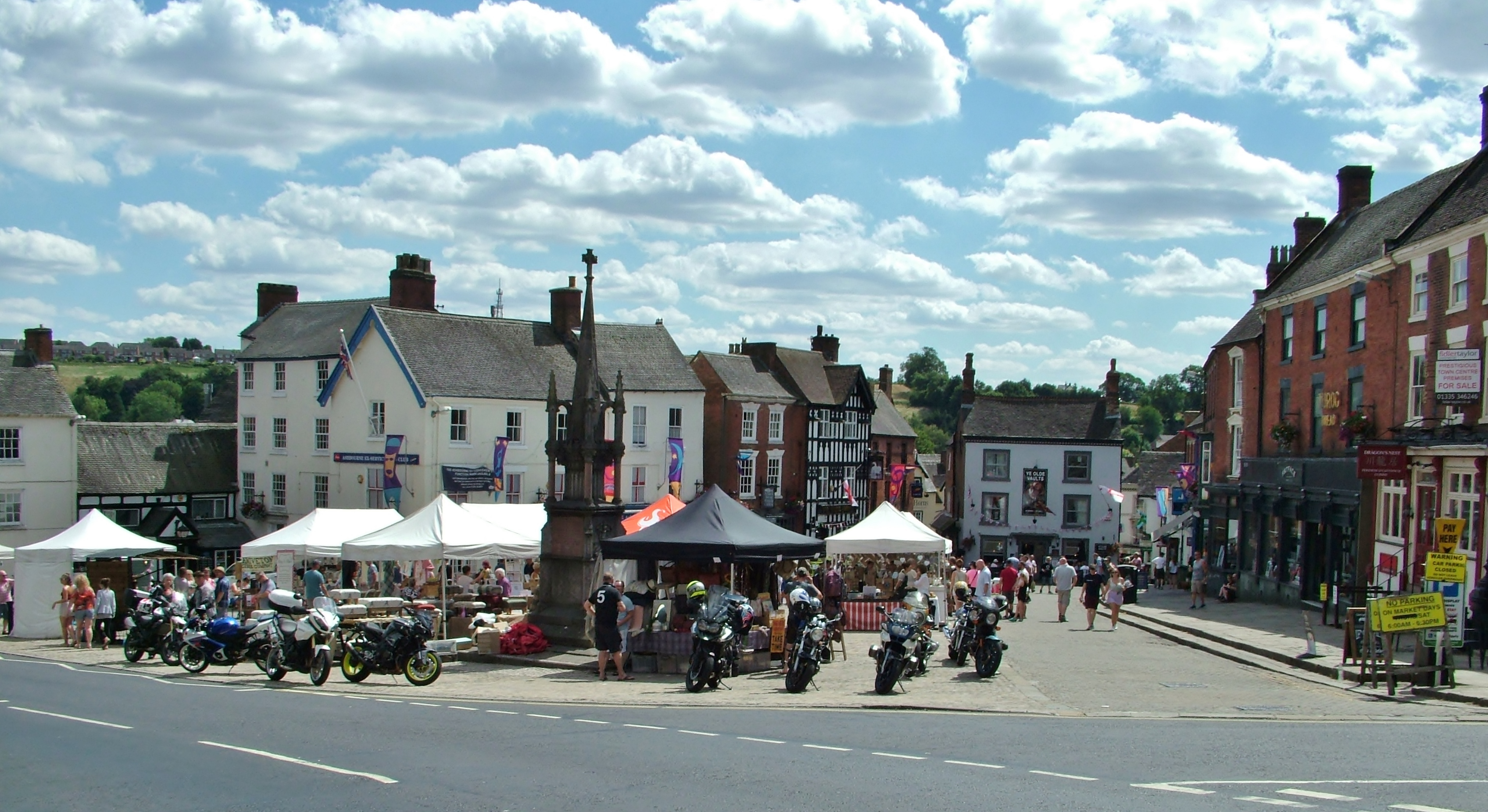
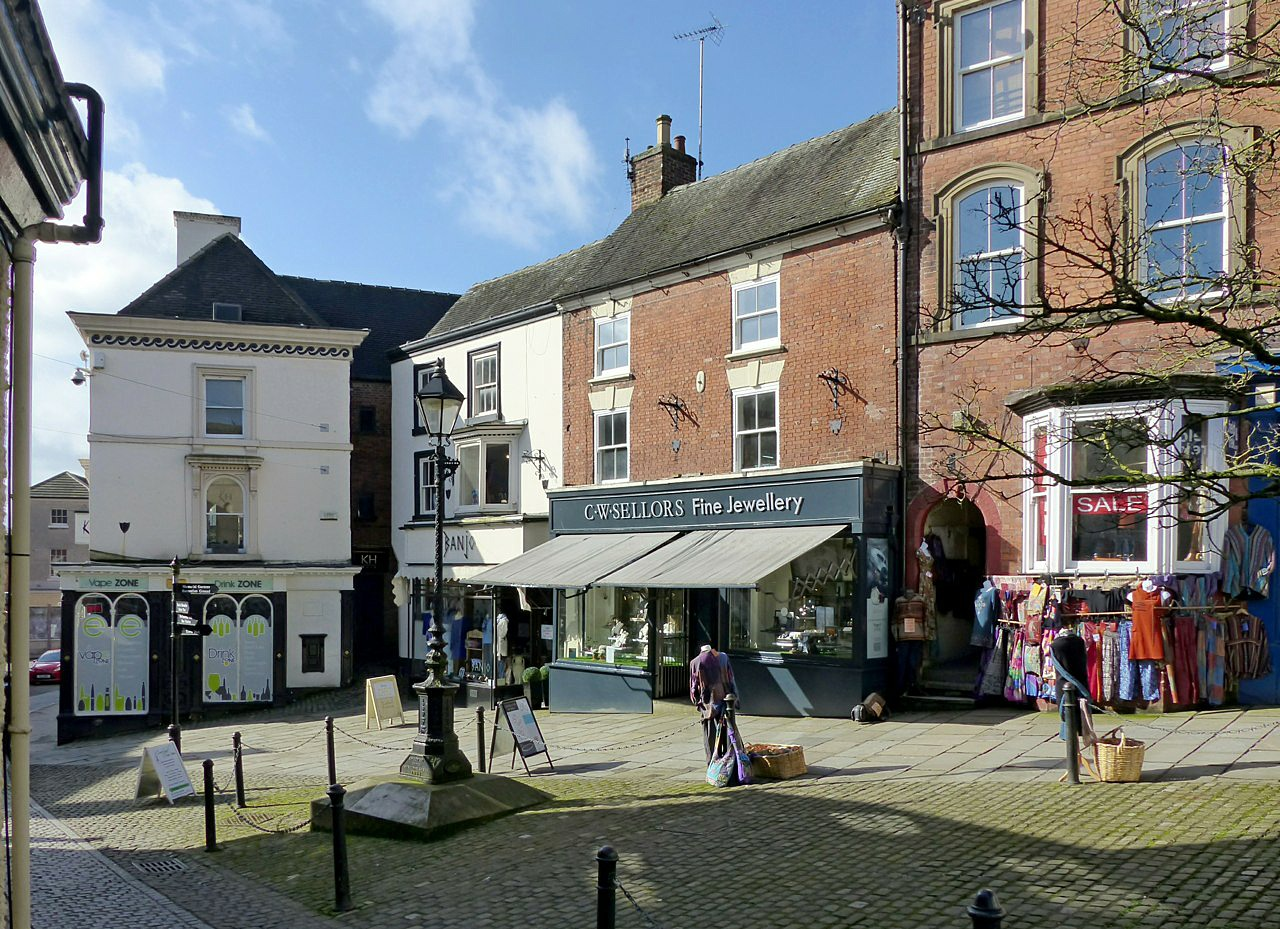
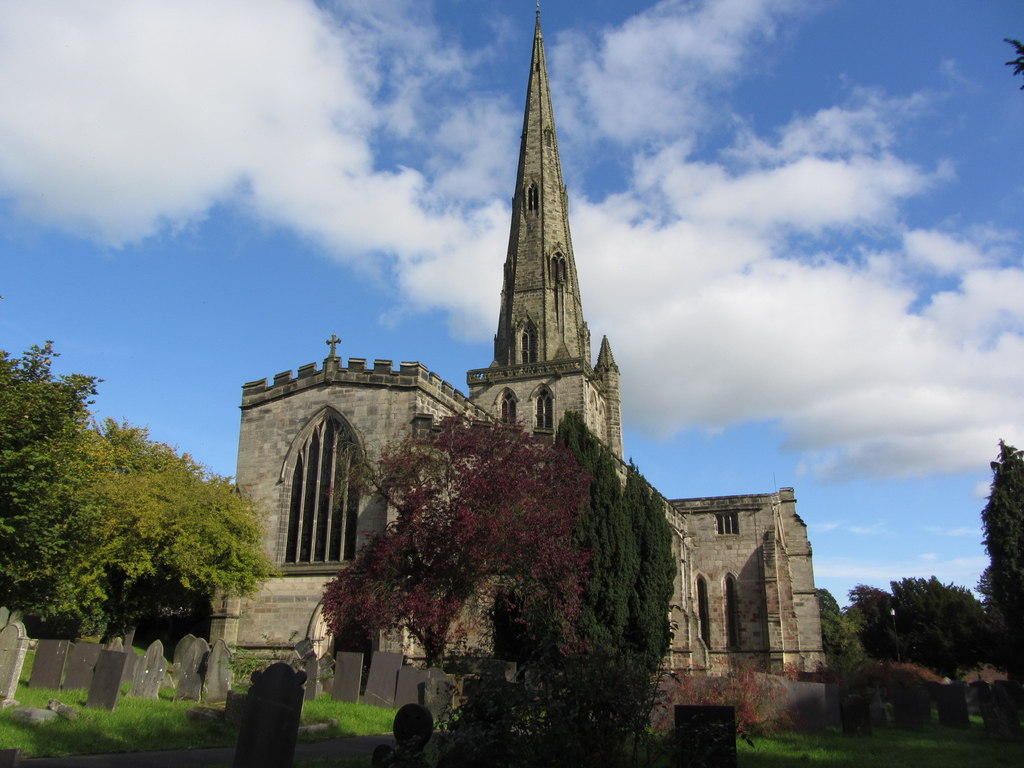
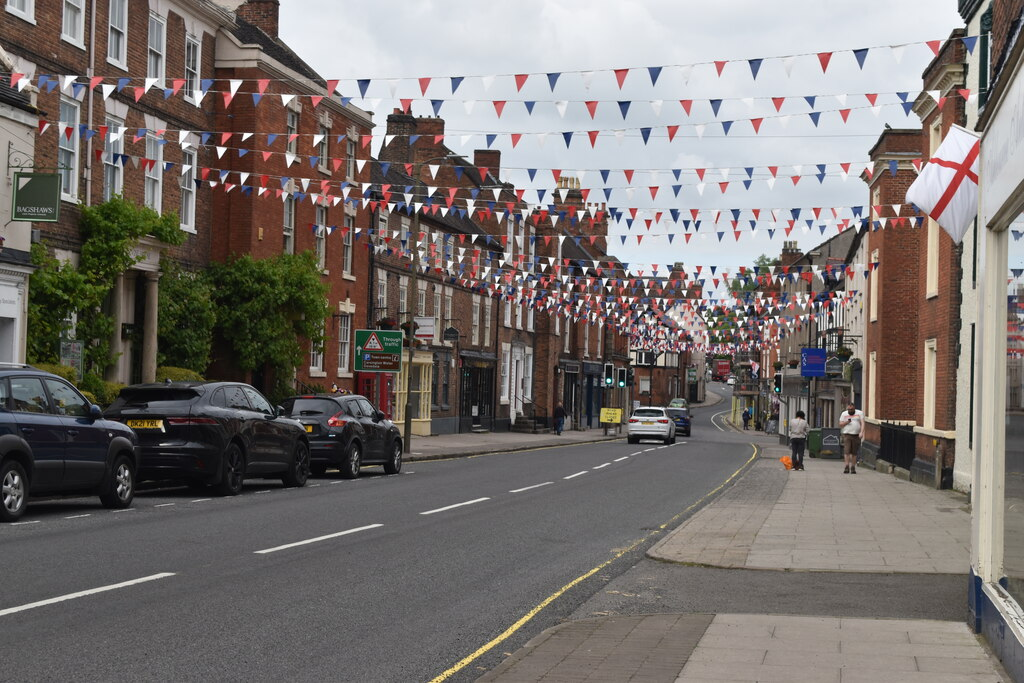
- Market Place Victoria Square St Oswald's Church Mayfield Road

- Location within Derbyshire
- Interactive map of Ashbourne
- Population: 8,967 (2021 census)
- OS grid reference: SK1846
- Civil parish: Ashbourne
- District: Derbyshire Dales
- Shire county: Derbyshire
- Region: East Midlands
- Country: England
- Sovereign state: United Kingdom
- Post town: Ashbourne
- Postcode district: DE6
- Dialling code: 01335
- Police: Derbyshire
- Fire: Derbyshire
- Ambulance: East Midlands
- UK Parliament: Derbyshire Dales
- Website: https://www.ashbournetowncouncil.gov.uk/

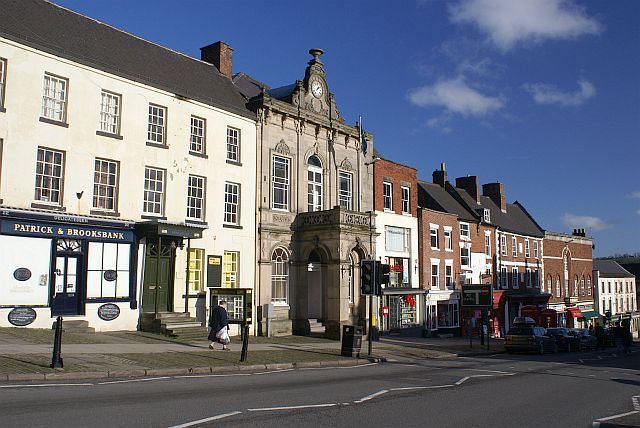
Ashbourne Town Hall and town centre

Ashbourne is a market town in the Derbyshire Dales district in Derbyshire, England, 14 miles (23 km) north-west of Derby. Its population was 8,967 in the 2021 census. It has many historical buildings and independent shops. The town hosts the historic annual Shrovetide football match. Its position near the southern edge of the Peak District makes it the closest town to Dovedale, to which Ashbourne is sometimes referred to as the gateway.

== History ==
The town's name derives from the Old English æsc-burna meaning "stream with ash trees".

Ashbourne was granted a market charter in 1257. In medieval times it was a frequent rest stop for pilgrims walking "St Non's Way" to the shrine of Saint Fremund at Dunstable in Bedfordshire.

The forces of Charles Edward Stuart passed through Ashbourne during the Jacobite rising of 1745.

The population was 2,158 inhabitants by the time of the 1841 census. The chief products of the town in the 1840s were cheese and malt.

== Geography ==
Ashbourne Green and Sturston are hamlets close by. Henmore Brook, a tributary of the River Dove, flows through the middle of the town. It has an elevation of 400 feet (122 m).

== Governance ==
At the lowest level of local government, Ashbourne is a civil parish with a town council. The council has four wards – Belle Vue, Hilltop, Parkside and St Oswald's – represented by a total of 13 councillors. It meets at Ashbourne Town Hall in the Market Place.

At district level, Ashbourne is in Derbyshire Dales district. On the district council, it is represented by 2 councillors for Ashbourne North ward and 3 councillors for Ashbourne South. At county level, Ashbourne ward sends one councillor to Derbyshire County Council.

Historically, Ashbourne was in Wirksworth Hundred. From 1894 until 1974, Ashbourne Urban District was the local government district for the town, while its rural hinterland was in Ashbourne Rural District.

== Demographics ==
At the 2021 census, Ashbourne had a population of 8,967 people in 4,048 households.

Census population of Ashbourne parish
Census	Population	Female	Male	Households	Source
2001	7,112	3,680	3,432	2,978	
2011	8,111	4,167	3,944	3,497	
2021	8,967	4,628	4,339	4,048	

== Economy ==
From 1910, Nestlé had a creamery in the town which, for a period, was contracted to produce Carnation condensed milk. The factory had its own private sidings connected to the railway station goods yard, which allowed milk trains to access the facility and distribute product as far south as London. After milk trains ceased in 1965, the railway track was lifted as passenger services and the railway station had already been closed back in 1954. The factory closed in 2003 and, since demolition in 2006, has been redeveloped as housing and a light industrial estate, although the old loading ramp from street level up to the factory floor is still in place.

Water from a borehole on the site was first marketed as Ashbourne Water in 1975 and was sold mostly to the catering trade. Nestlé retained the borehole after the factory shut, taking water by tanker to Buxton for bottling. Declining sales (1.3 million bottles in 2005, compared to 90 million for Buxton water) meant it could not justify further investment and the brand was discontinued in 2006.

Tourism is an important element of the local economy, due to the town's proximity to Dovedale and the Peak District. There is a visitor information centre in the town hall.

== Culture and community ==
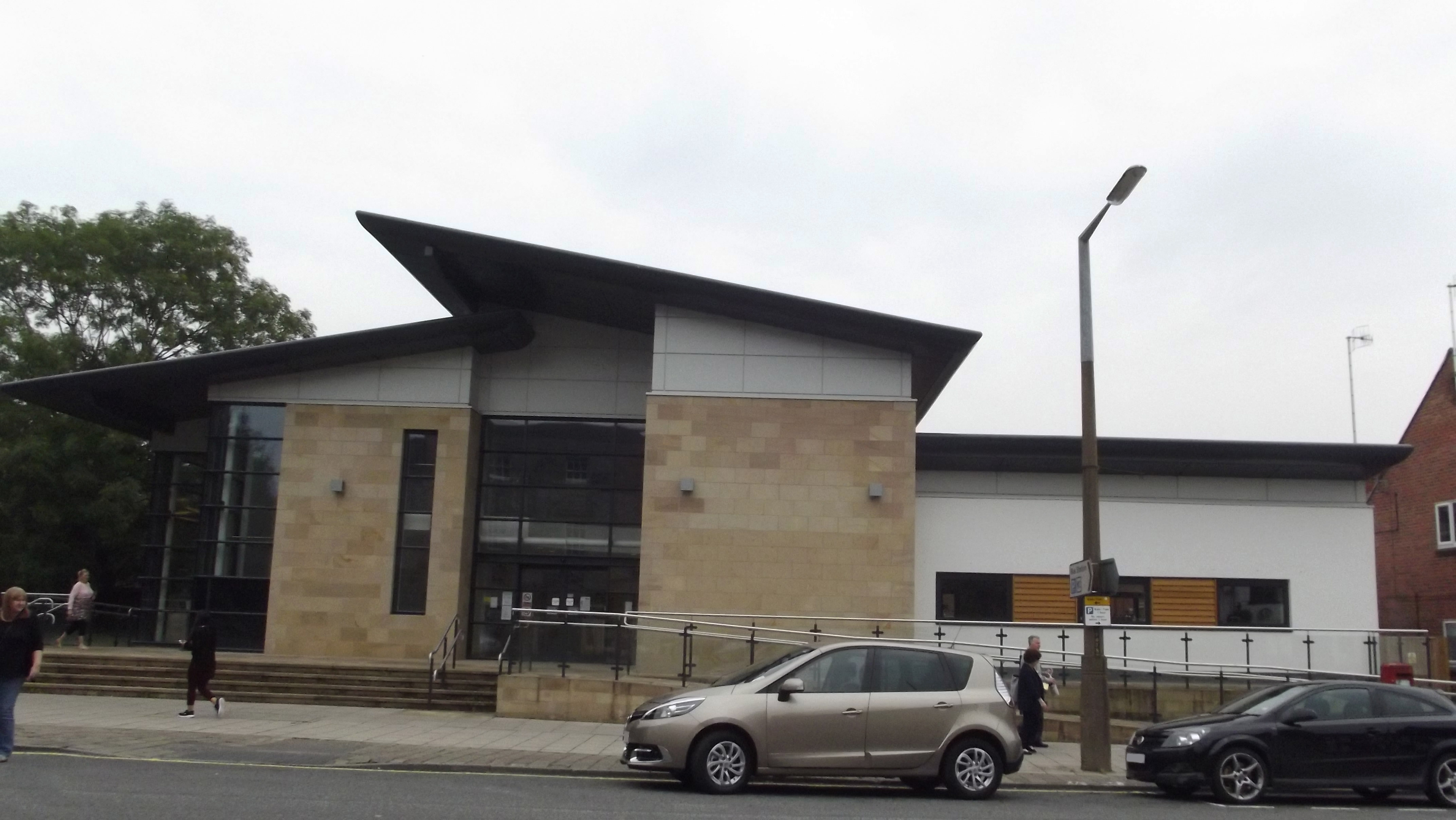
Ashbourne Library

The cobbled market place hosts a traditional outdoor market every Thursday and Saturday throughout the year, complementing the wide range of individual shops in the town. Although its market heritage is important, it came under threat of closure from Derbyshire County Council in November 2012. The people of Ashbourne opposed any such moves by the council and started an online petition. Ashbourne became the 97th Fairtrade Town in March 2005 after many businesses, cafes, shops and community organisations started supporting Fairtrade.

=== Ashbourne Shire Horse Society and Show ===
According to the Ashbourne Show website:

"In 1881, four gentlemen founded a society aimed at improving the standard of Shire horses in the Ashbourne area. Originally known as the Ashbourne Cart Horse Society, later that year, it held its first a show on the Paddock, at Ashbourne. This was so successful, it was determined by public meeting to put it on a permanent basis. Apart from a few years lost to war and foot-and-mouth, an annual show has been held ever since. In 1888, the title Ashbourne Shire Horse Society was adopted and royal patronage was granted in 1899 by King Edward VII, who was President in 1901. Shrovetide Football although much older, did not become royal till 1928. Although there have been ups and downs, the ambition of the founders has been fully justified. It has grown, changed and evolved, with cattle introduced in 1925 and sheep in 1957. Other sections have also been added, so that it has become the modern Ashbourne Show, now presented by the Ashbourne Shire Horse Society. However, what has not changed is the aim and ambition to produce a show for the encouragement of excellence in agriculture and animal husbandry and for the information education and entertainment of the local community and the visitors to the area each August."

== Media ==
Local news and television channels are BBC East Midlands and ITV Central. Television signals are received from the local relay transmitter.

Ashbourne's local radio stations are BBC Radio Derby on 104.5 FM, Smooth East Midlands on 106.6 FM, Capital Midlands on 102.8 FM and Greatest Hits Radio Midlands on 96.7 FM (formerly Ashbourne Radio).

The Ashbourne News Telegraph is the town’s weekly local newspaper.

== Landmarks ==
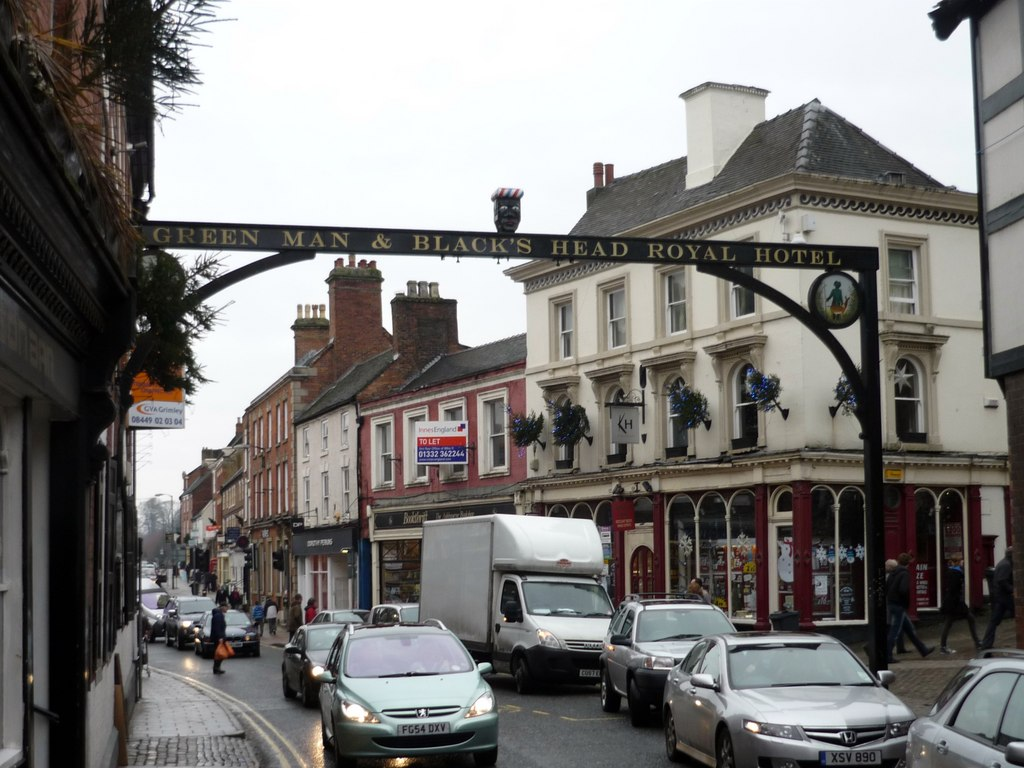
Grade II listed sign for the Green Man & Black's Head Royal Hotel

Ashbourne currently has eleven public houses and two social clubs. The most famous, the Green Man & Black's Head Royal Hotel, closed in 2011 and underwent a change of ownership in 2013, before reopening in 2018. The rare gallows sign across St John's Street remains a meeting point in the town. In June 2020, the caricature of a black man's head atop the sign became the focus of racial debate. It was removed after a petition had gathered more than 40,000 signatures, but it is being preserved locally.

== Transport ==
=== Railway ===
Ashbourne railway station once served the town on the Ashbourne to Buxton railway line; the line was closed to regular passenger traffic in 1954.

Today, the nearest railway stations are Uttoxeter, 12 miles away on the Crewe-Derby Line, and Derby, 13 miles away on the Midland Main Line.

Construction of the Ashbourne to Buxton line began in 1896. Passenger services started to Buxton in August 1899, after the building of a joint railway station to serve the London and North Western Railway (LNWR) and North Staffordshire Railway (NSR) lines. It closed to regular passenger traffic in 1954; all services on the Ashbourne–Parsley Hay section ceased in 1963. The line continued down the Dove to Rocester, near Uttoxeter, where it joined the main North Staffordshire Railway. This southern link had opened in 1852 and, in 1867, the LNWR gained running powers over the line. It also closed to passengers in 1954 and completely in the early 1960s.

The course of the Ashbourne to Buxton line up to Parsley Hay has since been converted to the Tissington Trail, a popular recreational walking and cycle path.

=== Buses ===
Bus services in the area are provided by High Peak Buses and TrentBarton. There is an hourly service between Derby and Uttoxeter that stops in Ashbourne; other routes connect the town with Matlock, Leek, Buxton, Wirksworth and Burton.

== Education ==
The main secondary school is Queen Elizabeth's Grammar School, founded in 1585. It moved to its current site on the Green Road in 1909 and took over Ashbourne County Secondary School in 1973.

== Religious sites ==
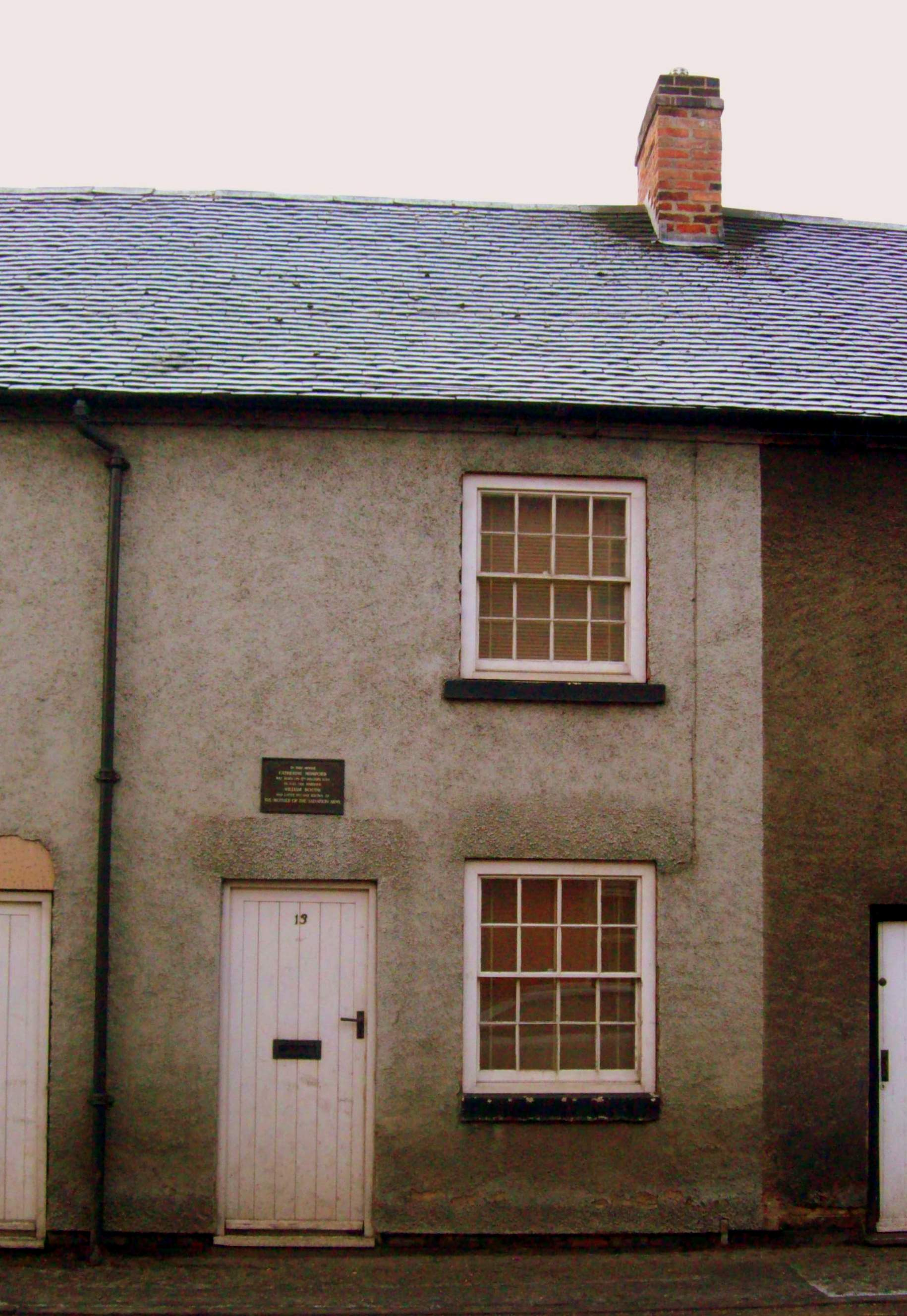
13, Sturston Road, birthplace of Catherine Booth, "mother" of the Salvation Army

The 215 ft (66 m) spire of St Oswald's Church overlooks the town. The church is Early English in style and was built around 1220. There are a few remnants of earlier Norman construction and the south aisle has part of a Saxon cross shaft.

The church of St John was built on Buxton Road in 1871 in a neo-Norman style. Ashbourne Churches Together (ACT) has a link with the Diocese of Patna in the ecumenical Church of North India. Regular reciprocal visits take place. Members of ACT are currently sponsoring the education of children in a school in Bihar, one of the poorest states in India.

== Recreation and sport ==
The Tissington Trail begins in the town. The path starts at Mappleton Lane on the northern outskirts of the town, accessed by a Victorian tunnel at the end of the leisure centre car park, which was formerly railway sidings. It follows the course of the former railway through the village of Tissington and joins the High Peak Trail (the old Cromford and High Peak Railway) at Parsley Hay.

The Limestone Way passes 2–3 miles (3.2–4.8 km) away, through Tissington, Thorpe, Marten Hill and above Mayfield to Rocester. There are several routes for walkers from Ashbourne to Limestone Way.

In the annual two-day Royal Shrovetide Football match, one half of the town plays the other, using the town as the pitch, with goals 3 miles (4.8 km) miles apart. As many as several thousand players compete, with a hand-painted, cork-filled ball. The game is also known as "hugball" and has been played from at least c.1667 although its exact origins are unknowns. The game is played by two teams, the Up'ards (those born north of Henmore Brook) and the Down'ards (those born south), over two eight-hour periods, subject to a few rules. The goal for the Up'ards is the Sturson Mill and the goal for the Down'ards is the old Clifton Mill. It is a moving mass (the Hug) that continues through the roads of the town, across fields, and even along the bed of the Henmore Brook. There were intermittent unsuccessful attempts to ban the game until the late 19th century.

Before the 1966 Football World Cup, the West German squad stayed at the nearby Peveril of the Peak Hotel and trained on one of Ashbourne's town football pitches near the park.

== Notable people ==
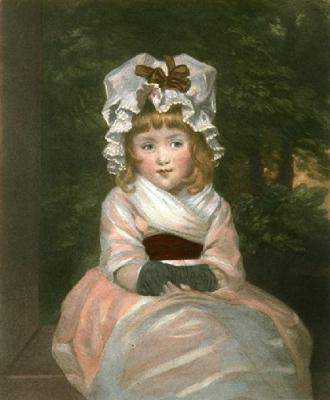
Penelope Boothby by Joshua Reynolds, 1788

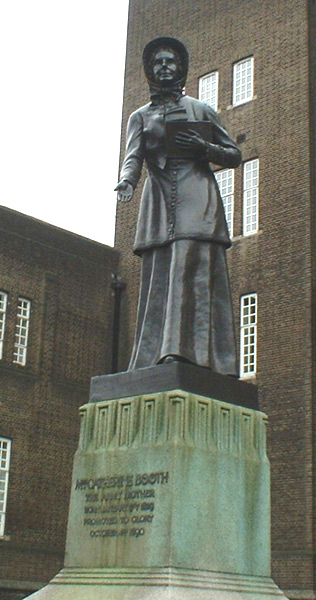
Statue of Catherine Booth, Mile End Road, London

In birth order:

- Robert Hill (died 1623), clergyman and a conforming Puritan.
- Sir Aston Cockayne (1608–1684), 1st Baronet Cockayne of Ashbourne, a Cavalier
- Catherine Pegge (born c. 1635) was mistress to Charles II, mother to Charles FitzCharles, 1st Earl of Plymouth, and a resident of nearby Yeldersley.
- John Bartram (c.1650 – 1697), Quaker politician who emigrated to Pennsylvania
- Timothy Manlove (1663–1699), Presbyterian minister and physician, supported the philosophy of Richard Bentley.
- William Bartram (1674–1711), grandfather of the naturalist, Quaker politician, settler in Pennsylvania.
- George Hayne (died 1723), merchant and entrepreneur, creator of the Trent Navigation
- Henry Cantrell (1684–1773), clergyman and religious controversialist, was born here.
- Hill Boothby (1708–1756), late love of Samuel Johnson, was born here.
- Thomas Browne (1708–1780), Garter Principal King of Arms, was born here.
- John Taylor of Ashbourne (1711–1788), lawyer and cleric; wealthy landowner and stockbreeder.
- Thomas Kirkland (1721–1798), an English physician and medical writer.
- Thomas Healde (1724–1789), an English physician.
- Sir Brooke Boothby, 6th Baronet (1744–1824), linguist, translator, poet and landowner.
- Thomas Blore (1754–1818), an English topographer.
- Penelope Boothby (1785–1791), a famous child character in British art.
- William Corden the Elder (ca. 1795–1867), portrait painter and miniaturist.
- Francis Wright (1806–1873) industrialist and philanthropist, lived at Osmaston, Derbyshire Dales
- Catherine Booth (1829–1890), known as the "mother" of the Salvation Army, was born here.
- Adeline Sergeant (1851–1904), a prolific writer, writing over ninety novels, including Jacobi's Wife.
- F. C. R. Jourdain (1865–1940), ornithologist and oologist, also served as Vicar of Clifton-by-Ashbourne.
- David Redfern (1935–2014), photographer, specialised in music photography.
- Roy Wood (born 1946), musician, co-founded The Move, lives here.
- Andrew Lewer (born 1971), East Midlands MEP, and MP for Northampton South, lived locally, and attended Queen Elizabeth's Grammar School, Ashbourne.
- James Rutledge (born 1978), musician, record producer and remixer
- Dave Tyack (1978 – c. 2002), guitarist, drummer and singer
- Paris Paloma (born 1999), English singer-songwriter and guitarist

== See also ==
- St Oswald's Hospital
