= Sturston, Derbyshire =

Coordinates: 53.0142°N 1.704°W

Sturston
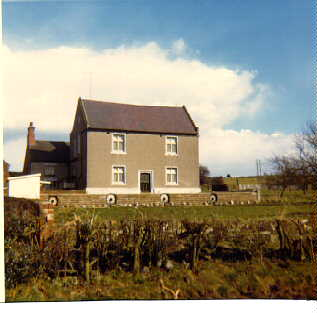
- Sturston Hall

- Location within Derbyshire
- OS grid reference: SK199463
- Civil parish: Offcote and Underwood
- District: Derbyshire Dales
- Shire county: Derbyshire
- Region: East Midlands
- Country: England
- Sovereign state: United Kingdom
- Post town: ASHBOURNE
- Postcode district: DE6
- Police: Derbyshire
- Fire: Derbyshire
- Ambulance: East Midlands

Sturston is a small area of settlement in the civil parish of Offcote and Underwood, in the Derbyshire Dales district, in the county of Derbyshire, England. It is located on the A517 road, 1-mile (1.6 km) east of Ashbourne.

Sturston was formerly a township in the parish of Ashborne, in 1866 Sturston became a separate civil parish, on 1 April 1934 the parish was abolished and merged with Ashbourne, "Offcote and Underwood" and Bradley. In 1931 the parish had a population of 225.

Sturston Hall is mentioned in the Domesday Book as one of two manors held by Ulfkell and Wodi, each manor being of half a carucate (a Danish land measure) each. The two manors were given to Henry de Ferrers after the Norman Conquest. By 1348 Sir Ralf Rochfort had inherited Sturston, with Grendon and Shenstone. He died childless, and in 1386 the estates passed to Sir William Chetwynd, 1st Lord Grendon of Ingestre in Staffordshire. Chetwynd sold the manor of Sturston to John Kniveton of Bradley, son of Sir John Kniveton and the hall stayed in the ownership of the Kniveton family for several hundred years. By 1630 Sir Gilbert Kniveton, 2nd Baronet High Sheriff of Derbyshire had inherited the Bradley and Sturston estates which were sold by 1655 to Francis Meynell a citizen and goldsmith of London. The estates passed to Hugh Charles Meynell who sold Sturston to a Stoddart in about 1847. Mrs Elizabeth Stoddart was Lady of the Manor in 1857 with around 700 acres (2.8 km^{2}). During most of its time the Hall was let to tenants, who farmed the land.
