= Totley Moor =

Hill in the Derbyshire Peak District

Coordinates: 53°18′58″N 1°35′02″W

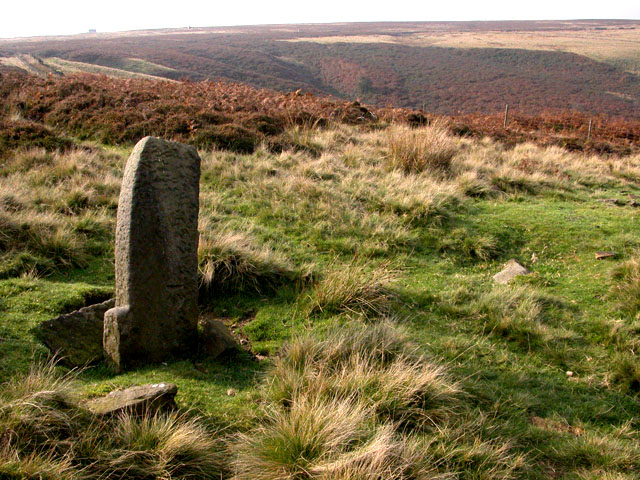
- Post on Totley Moor

Highest point
- Elevation: 395 metres (1,296 ft)

Geography
- Location: Peak District, England
- OS grid: SK278799
- Topo map: OS Explorer OL24

Totley Moor is an open moorland hill to the west of the Sheffield suburb of Totley, in the Derbyshire Peak District. The summit is 395 metres (1,296 ft) above sea level.

Totley Tunnel runs for 3.5 miles (5.6 km) under Totley Moor and Longshaw Estate, between Totley and Grindleford stations. It was built between 1888 and 1893 by Midland Railway for the route between Sheffield and Manchester through the Hope Valley. A large air ventilation shaft rises from a natural cavern, which the tunnel passes through, up to the surface on Totley Moor. The tunnel remains in use today for frequent trans-Pennine passenger trains.

Bar Brook stream drains the marshy Totley Moss area, running south to feed the disused Bar Brook Reservoir. It then continues to flow south and into the River Derwent by Chatsworth Park.

On the north-eastern side of Totley Moor, Blacka Moor Nature Reserve is managed by Sheffield & Rotherham Wildlife Trust. The reserve covers 181 hectares and is part of the Eastern Peak District Moors SSSI (Site of Special Scientific Interest). The open moor is a landscape of purple moor-grass, heathers and bilberry. It provides a moorland habitat for willow warblers, black caps, cuckoos, wheatears, stonechats and whinchats. Red deer are also a common sight.

There are three Bronze Age cairnfields along Brown Edge ridge which are protected Scheduled Monuments. An excavation in 1963 of the site of a 7m wide ring cairn discovered cremation remains, urns, a pygmy cup and a hearth. The artefacts are on display in Weston Park Museum, Sheffield. In 1960, following fires on the moor, a Bronze Age shale-working floor was discovered at Flask Edge with shale fragments of bracelets and rings.

Following the Countryside and Rights of Way Act 2000, this gritstone upland moor became "Open Access" land for the public. The Sheffield Country Walk bridlepath runs across the moor between Totley and the A6187 road. The Peak District Boundary Walk crosses the eastern side of Totley Moor, running through Blacka Moor Nature Reserve and above Brown Edge, just below the summit.
