= Hathersage Road (Sheffield) =

Road in South Yorkshire and Derbyshire, England

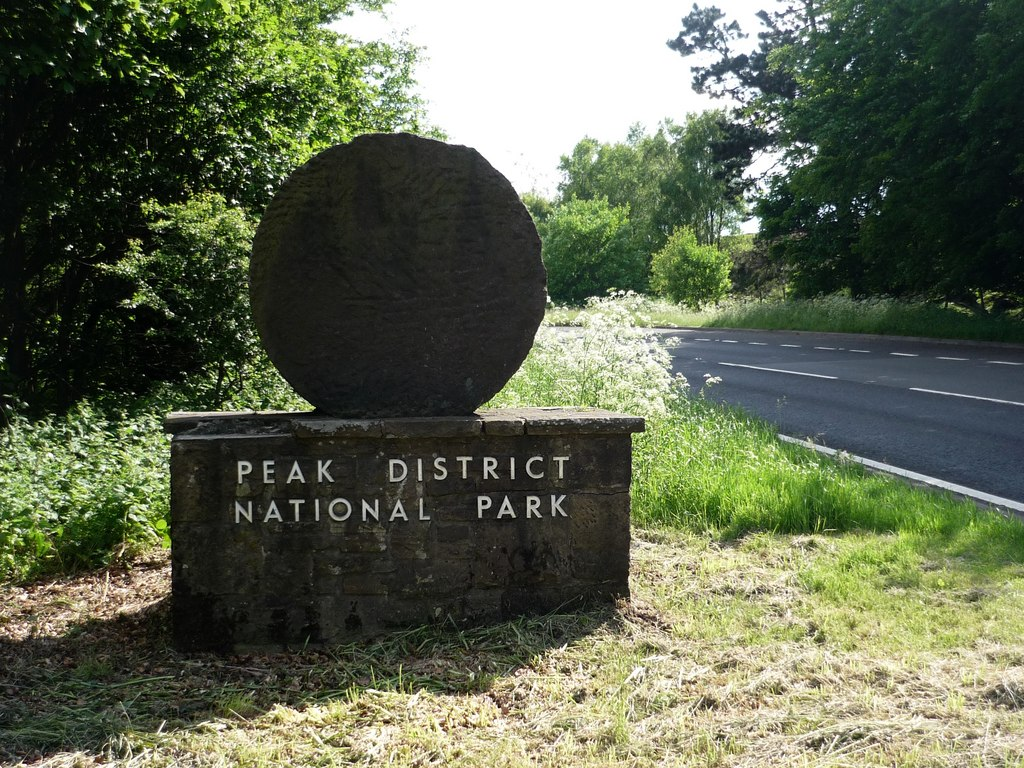
Stone marking the entrance to the Peak District on Hathersage Road

Hathersage Road is a road in Sheffield South Yorkshire, England and Derbyshire. It leads south-west from the suburb of Whirlow over the border between Hathersage and Sheffield, before becoming Sheffield Road at the point called Surprise View. The road begins at a bridge on the Limb Brook, the former boundary between Yorkshire and Derbyshire. There the road changes name from Ecclesall Road South to Hathersage Road.

The road passes Whirlow Brook Park and Whirlow Hall Farm, the Dore Moor Inn, Fox House hotel at the top of Padley Gorge, crosses the Burbage Brook and ends at a tight curve at Surprise View, from where there are views of Hope Valley. The junction with Cross Lane and Long Line is deemed dangerous and a speed camera was installed. According to the Sheffield antiquarian, Sidney Oldall Addy, a feature known as the Giant's Chair could be found close to the road, near the junction of Whitelow Lane. No sign of this feature appears on modern maps, although it is shown on an 1888 map in Addy's A glossary of words used in the neighbourhood of Sheffield.

Blacka Moor Nature Reserve, managed by the Wildlife Trust for Sheffield and Rotherham is located close to the intersection of the A625 and A6187. The 181 hectares (450 acres) reserve is the largest of the nature reserves managed by the trust, and has a migrant bird population which includes willow warblers, blackcaps, common cuckoos, northern wheatears, European stonechats and whinchats.

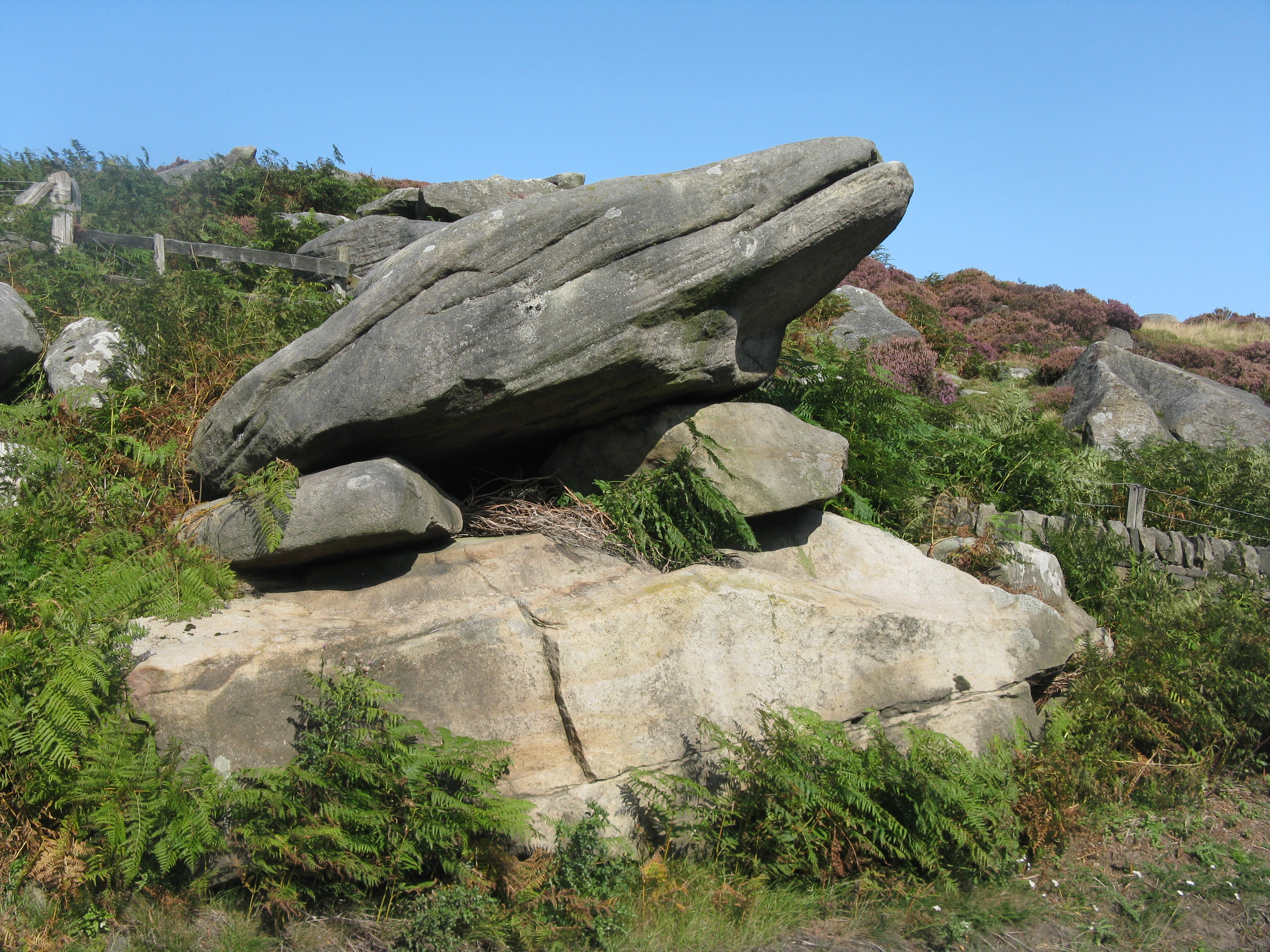
Toad's Mouth

Near Fox House, the road bends tightly whilst passing over Padley Gorge and is overshadowed by Toad's Mouth; a stone hanging over the road not dissimilar to the shape of a toad. This feature marks the boundary between Sheffield and Derbyshire.

The road forms part of the A625. Until 2000, the entire course of Hathersage Road was numbered A625. Hathersage Road is now only numbered A625 as far as the junction with Stony Ridge Road where the A625 proceeds towards Calver. Between Hathersage and Stony Ridge Road junction, Hathersage Road is numbered A6187. A section of the A625 was severed in 1979 due to a landslip at Mam Tor hence the re-designation of the road number for part of the route.
