= Toad's Mouth =

Rock formation in the Peak District National Park, England

Coordinates: 53.322°N 1.628°W

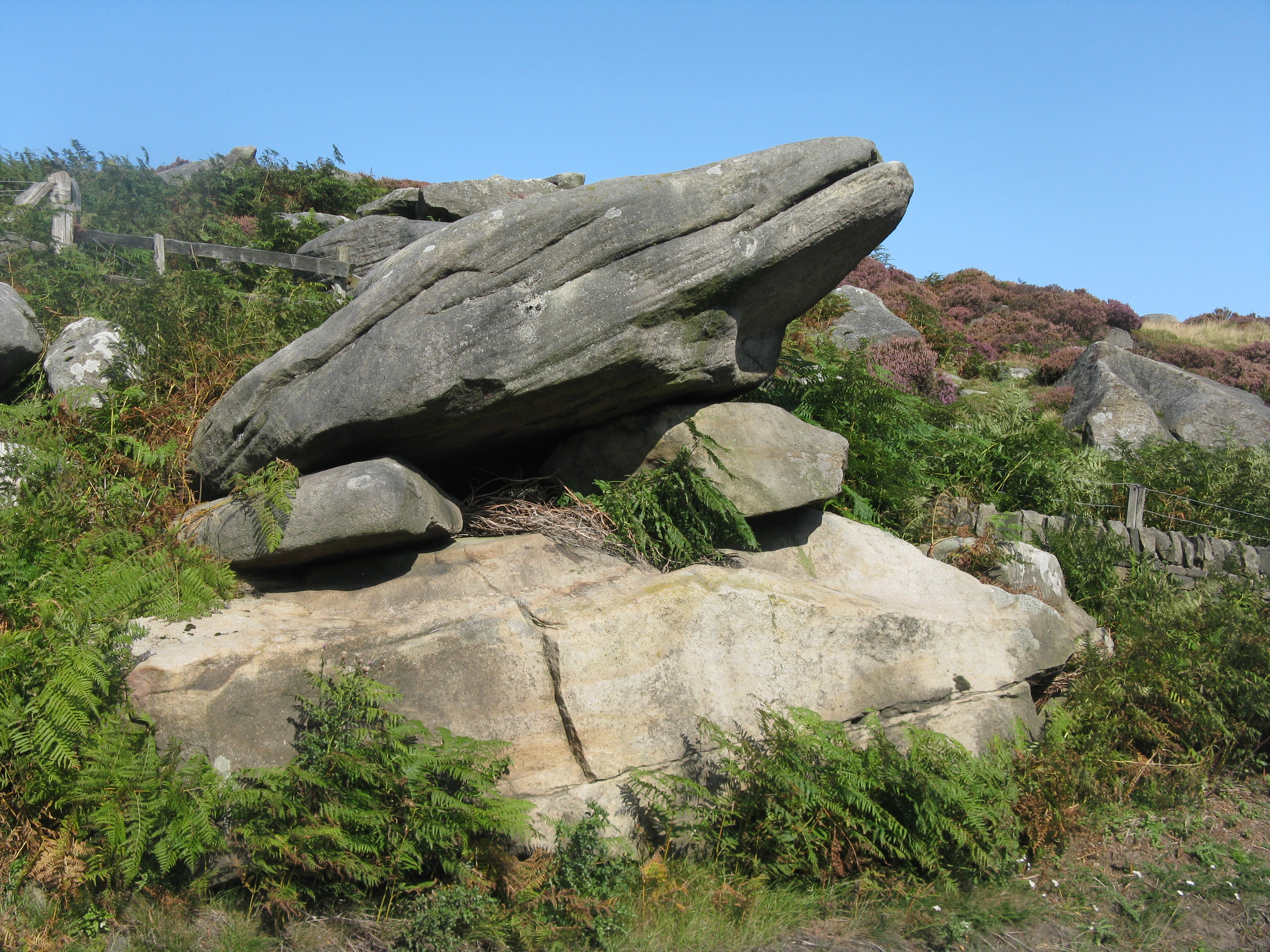
Toad's Mouth

The Toad's Mouth is a natural rock formation located by the A6187 in the Peak District. The rock, located to the north-west of Fox House and the Longshaw Estate, was named due to its likeness to a Toad's head.
