= Ecclesall Road =

Road in Sheffield, South Yorkshire, England

- Ecclesall Road South A625

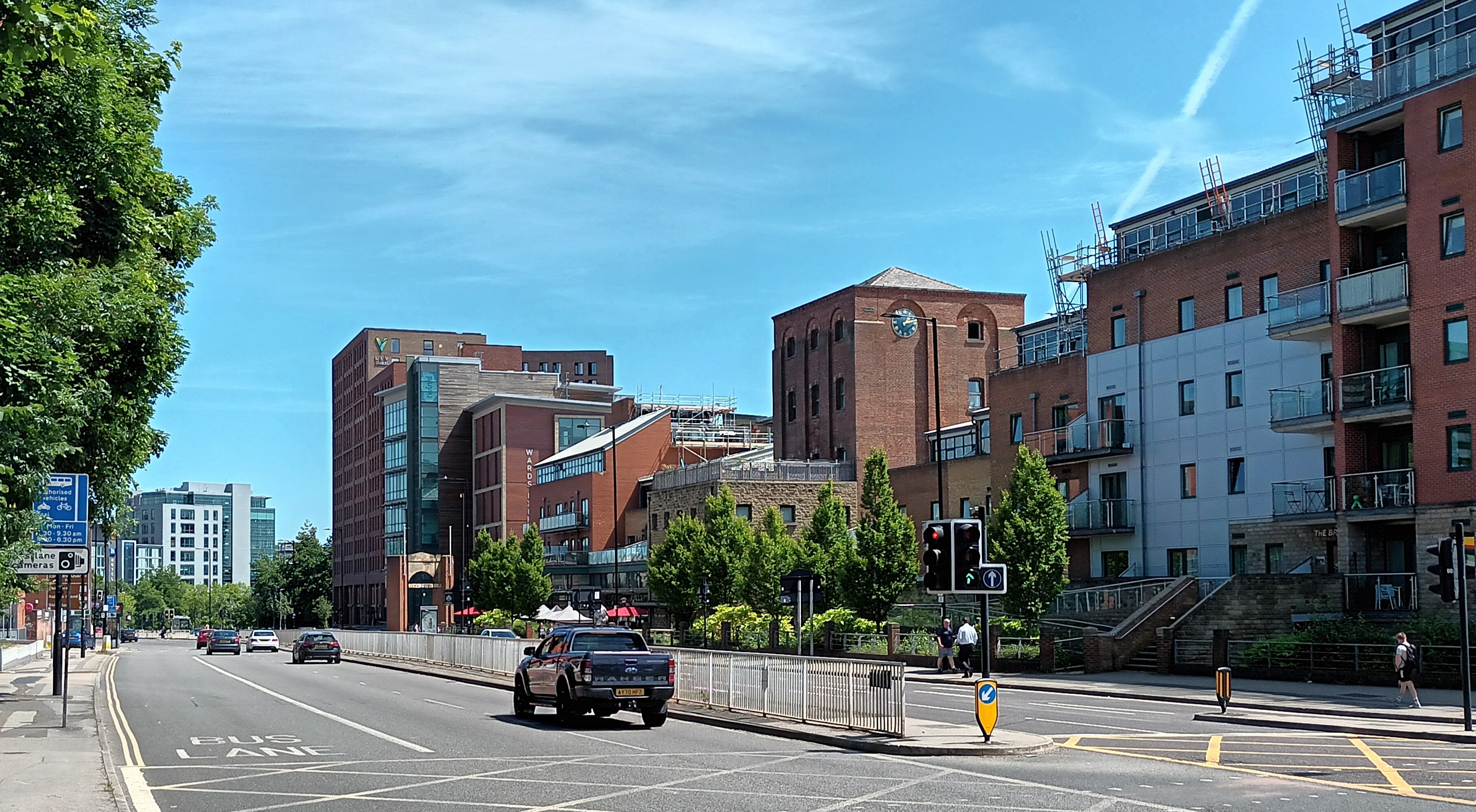
- Ecclesall Road (2022)
- Interactive map of Ecclesall Road
- Length: 3.6 mi (5.8 km)
- Location: Sheffield, South Yorkshire, England
- North-east end: 53.3732°N 1.4812°W
- South-west end: 53.3391°N 1.5350°W

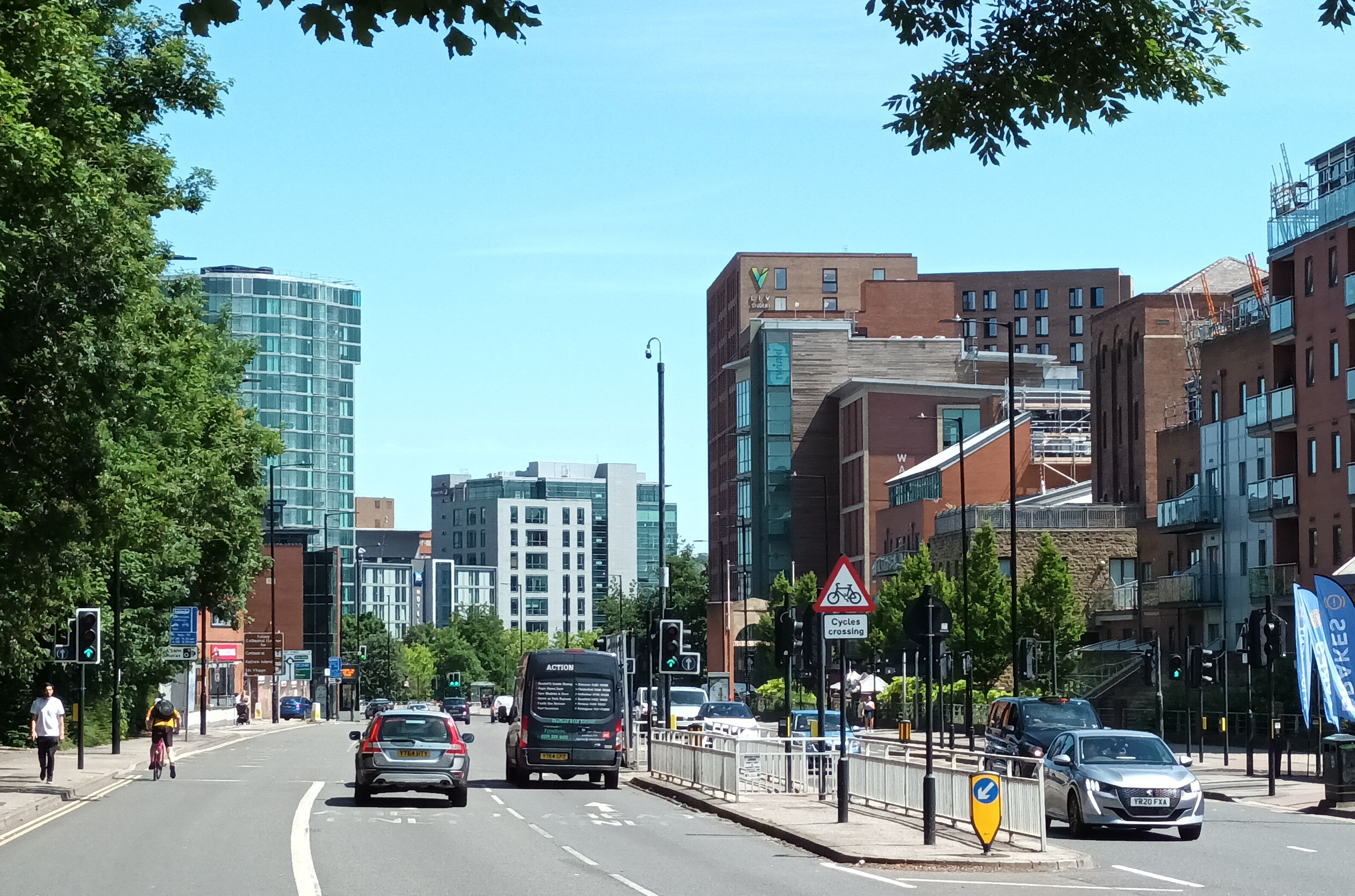
To the right is the apartment complex on the site of the Old Ward's Brewery, at the bottom of Ecclesall Road where it meets the Inner City Ring Road.

Ecclesall Road is a road in Sheffield, South Yorkshire, England, that runs for about 3.6 miles (5.8 km) south-west from Sheffield's city centre under the number A625. At Banner Cross, where the house numbers reach 1001, the road name changes to Ecclesall Road South and numbering restarts. Ecclesall Road, as a named road, finishes at Whirlow, although the course of the road continues as Hathersage Road.

== Overview ==
From the city centre to Banner Cross, the road is home to many pubs and a significant amount of student accommodation. In the suburb of Ecclesall, one of the UK's wealthiest districts, the road is bordered by rather large properties.

Ecclesall Road is itself noted for its vast range of restaurants, pubs, bars cafes and shops, including many one-off boutiques. The Ecclesall Road shopping area is mostly on the South side of the road, and also includes Hunters Bar and Sharrow Vale Road. As the road nears the City Centre, there is a Marks and Spencers food store, a number of large multi-storey apartment developments and a Waitrose supermarket. The north side of the road is residential, containing the Hannover Flats and the districts of Broomhall, The Groves and Ranmoor. Sunnybank Nature Reserve, established in 1985 and managed by the Wildlife Trust for Sheffield and Rotherham, is located at the city centre end of the road. The Sheffield Botanical Gardens are close to Ecclesall Road, opposite the Berkley Precinct shopping centre. It has a large student population, mostly from Sheffield Hallam University, who have a campus on nearby Collegiate Crescent, although there are some flats owned by the University of Sheffield. The road also runs past Endcliffe Park and close to Ecclesall Woods.

== History ==
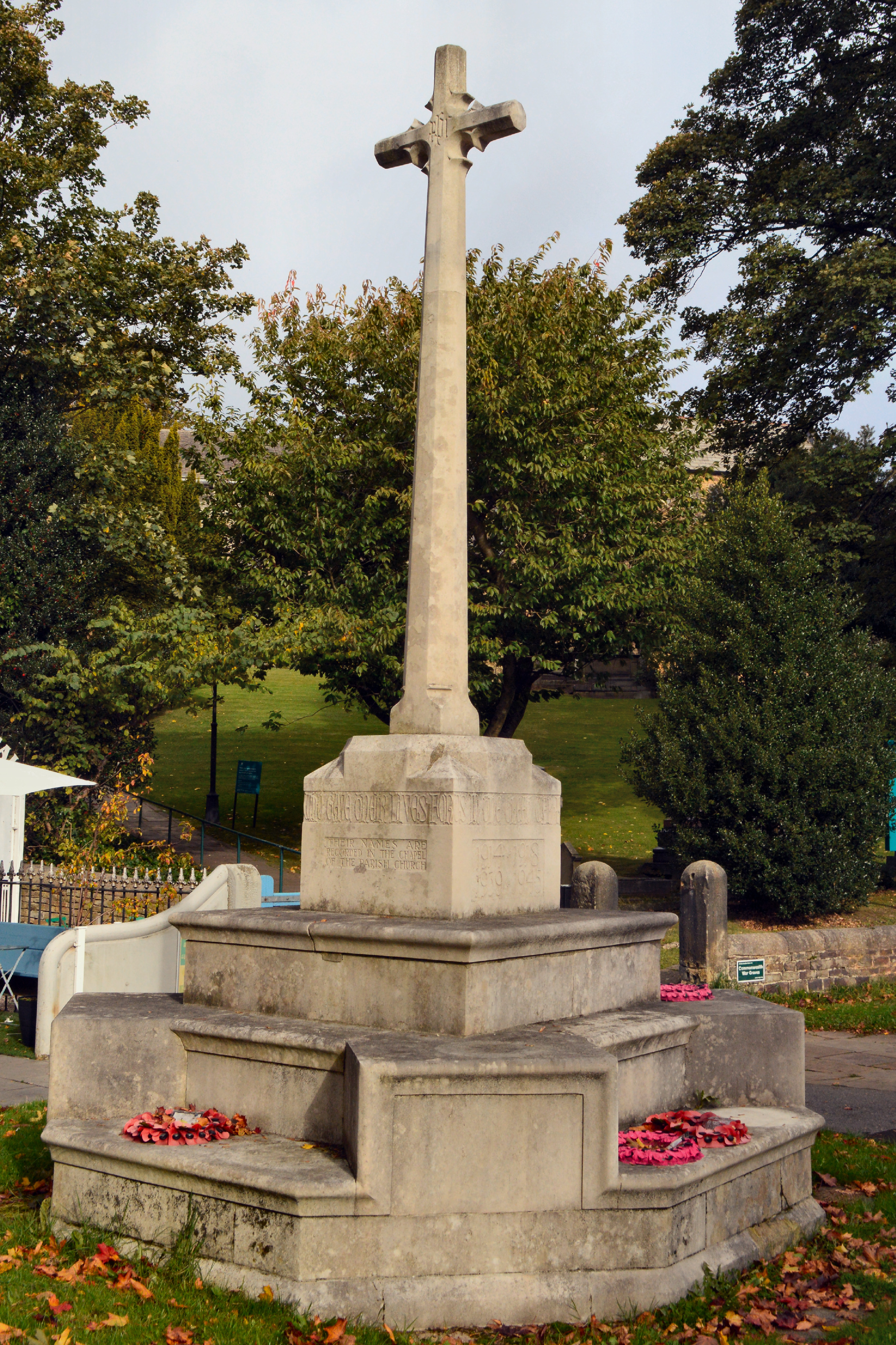
Ecclesall War Memorial

Ecclesall Road was constructed in the early part of the 19th century, and was operated as a turnpike road by the Sheffield and Chapel-en-le-Frith Trust—the first toll being paid at Hunter's Bar. The tolls were abolished on 31 October 1884 and the toll house at Hunter's Bar was demolished, although the gate posts were preserved and are now situated in the centre of Hunters Bar roundabout. In the early part of the 20th century the road was used by one of the city's tramway lines, terminating at the top of Woodholm Road. This was one of the first tram routes to close, being abandoned in March 1954 despite a petition against its closure of 11,000 signatures. The starting point of Ecclesall Road was originally the junction of London Road and Cemetery Road running past Sheffield General Cemetery, but the road was truncated at Moore Street when Sheffield's Inner Ring was constructed in the 1960s.

The Grade-II Listed war memorial was erected in 1920, and made from Portland stone. It is located alongside Ecclesall Road South, near Ecclesall Parish Church.

== Notable people ==
- Willie Williams, set designer for the likes of U2, grew up on the road.

== See also ==
- Transport in Sheffield
- Sheffield Hallam (UK Parliament constituency)
