= High Peak Estate =

National Trust owned moorland in Derbyshire, England

Coordinates: 53.366°N 1.816°W

- Location within Derbyshire
- OS grid reference: SK122856
- District: High Peak
- Shire county: Derbyshire
- Region: East Midlands
- Country: England
- Sovereign state: United Kingdom
- Post town: HOPE VALLEY
- Postcode district: S33
- Dialling code: 01433
- Police: Derbyshire
- Fire: Derbyshire
- Ambulance: East Midlands
- UK Parliament: High Peak

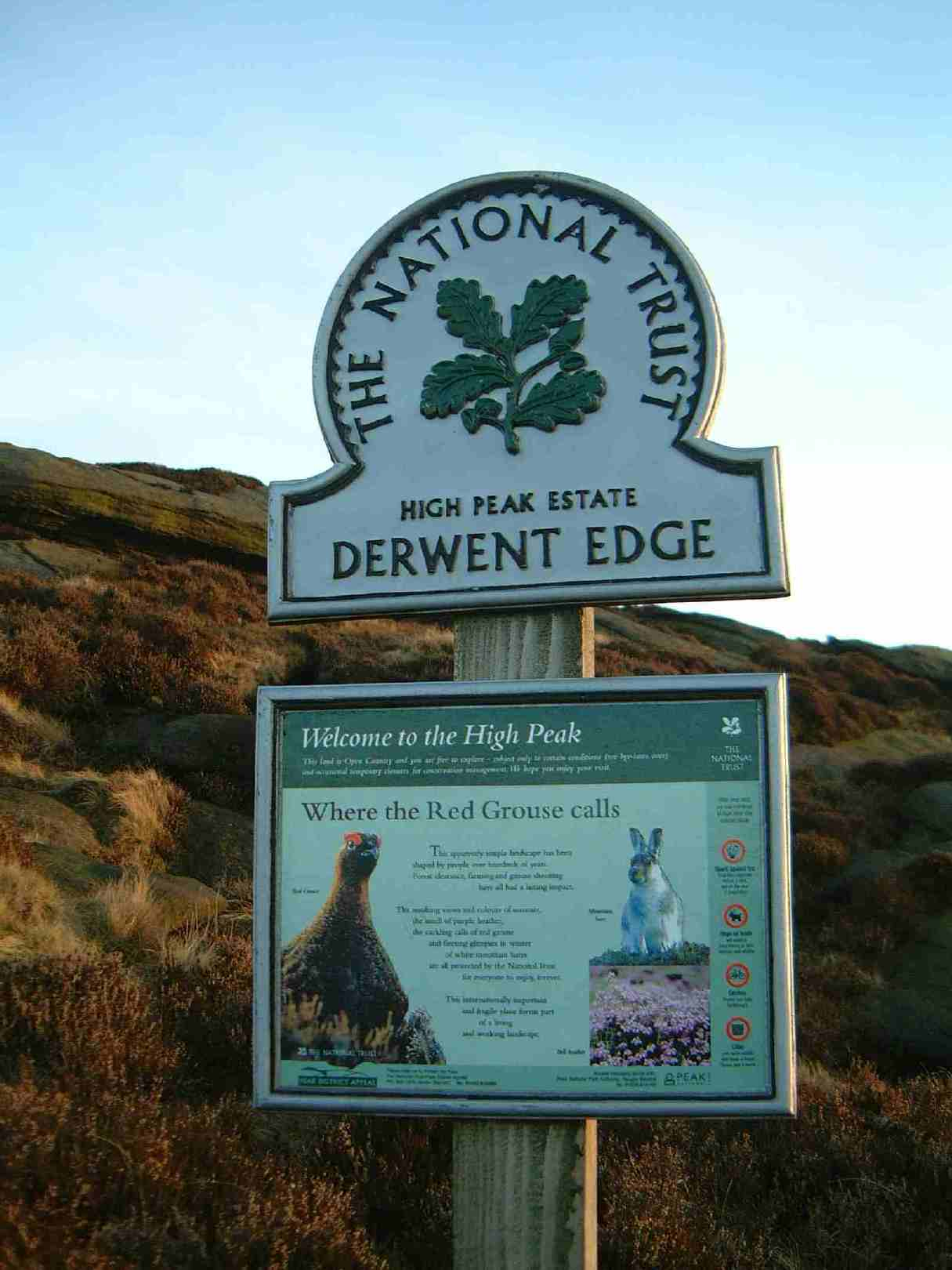
National Trust sign on Derwent Edge on the Dark Peak Estate.

The High Peak Estate is an area of Pennine moorland in the ownership of the National Trust in the Dark Peak area of Derbyshire, England.

The National Trust High Peak Estate is to be known as the 'Dark Peak Area' from summer 2010 which is now part of the Peak District Estate. The Peak District Estate also includes the White Peak Estate (formerly South Peak Estate) and the Longshaw Estate near Sheffield and includes a number of sites of interest including:

- Alport Castles (a spectacular natural landslip)
- Bleaklow (a massive expanse of wild, windswept moorland)
- Derwent Edge
- Kinder Scout (the moorland plateau that was the site of 1932's Mass Trespass and the highest point in the Peak District)
- Mam Tor
- Odin Mine (one of the oldest lead mines in the county)
- Snake Pass (to the north-east of the estate)
- Winnats Pass (west of Castleton)

== See also ==
- Forest of High Peak
