= Grenoside =

Suburb of Sheffield, South Yorkshire, England

Coordinates: 53.441°N 1.502°W

- Location within Sheffield
- Population: 4,177 (2001)
- Civil parish: Ecclesfield
- Metropolitan borough: City of Sheffield
- Metropolitan county: South Yorkshire
- Region: Yorkshire and the Humber
- Country: England
- Sovereign state: United Kingdom
- Post town: SHEFFIELD
- Postcode district: S35
- Dialling code: 0114
- Police: South Yorkshire
- Fire: South Yorkshire
- Ambulance: Yorkshire
- UK Parliament: Penistone and Stocksbridge

Grenoside is an historic village on the outskirts of Sheffield, South Yorkshire, England. The village lies within the West Ecclesfield ward of the city.

== History ==
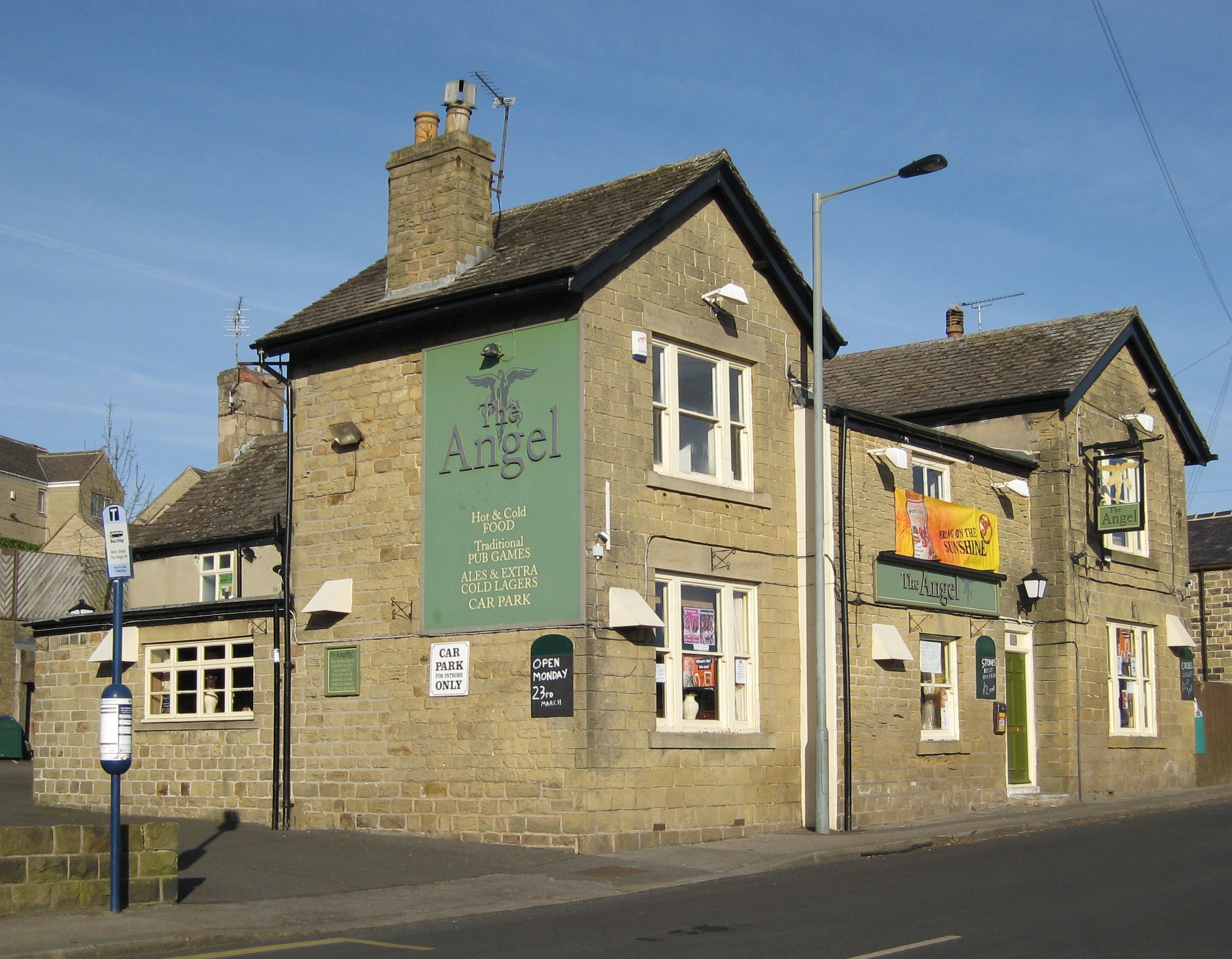
The Angel, Main Street, Grenoside

The sandstone found in the area between Sheffield and Kirkburton, near Huddersfield, is known as "Grenoside Sandstone".

In Norman and later documents, it is named as Gravenho (1199) and Gravenhowe (1332). This name is made from the Saxon word elements of Grave meaning "to dig" and How meaning Hollow. In this sense the meaning of Gravenhowe would be "Quarried Hollows" or "Quarried Hills" and indicates that stone has been quarried in Grenoside from the ninth century until 1938, when the last quarry on Norfolk Hill closed. Other spellings of the name are Granenhou (1267), Granow (1450), Graynau (1534), Grenoside (1759), Greenaside (1772) and Grinaside (1831).

Stone quarrying was a major industry in Grenoside from a very early date until it ceased in 1939. The stone quarried in Grenoside varied in quality and was put to several uses. The finer grained, hard stones were much in demand as grindstones for the cutlery trade and for fine fettling and finishing in iron foundries. Coarse grained stone was used for furnace lining and from these were hewn the stone boxes used in the cementation process of steelmaking. In 1860, the following are named as quarry owners in Grenoside – Thomas Beever, George Broadhead, George Firth, Thomas Lint, Joseph Swift and Charles Uttley.

By the beginning of the seventeenth century, several village people were named in connection with the making of cutlery. William Smith, a yeoman of Grenoside, who died "of great age" in 1627 had taken out a cutlers mark in 1614. His son, Henry, was a member of the Cutler's Company in 1629. The manufacture of cutlery was restricted to those who had served an apprenticeship in the trade; an apprentice served seven or ten years without pay. The restriction was closely controlled by the Company of Cutlers in Hallamshire from 1624. As a result, many small nailmaking businesses were set up which was not so tightly controlled. As late as 1860, three nailmakers were listed as living and working in Grenoside.

== Modern Grenoside ==
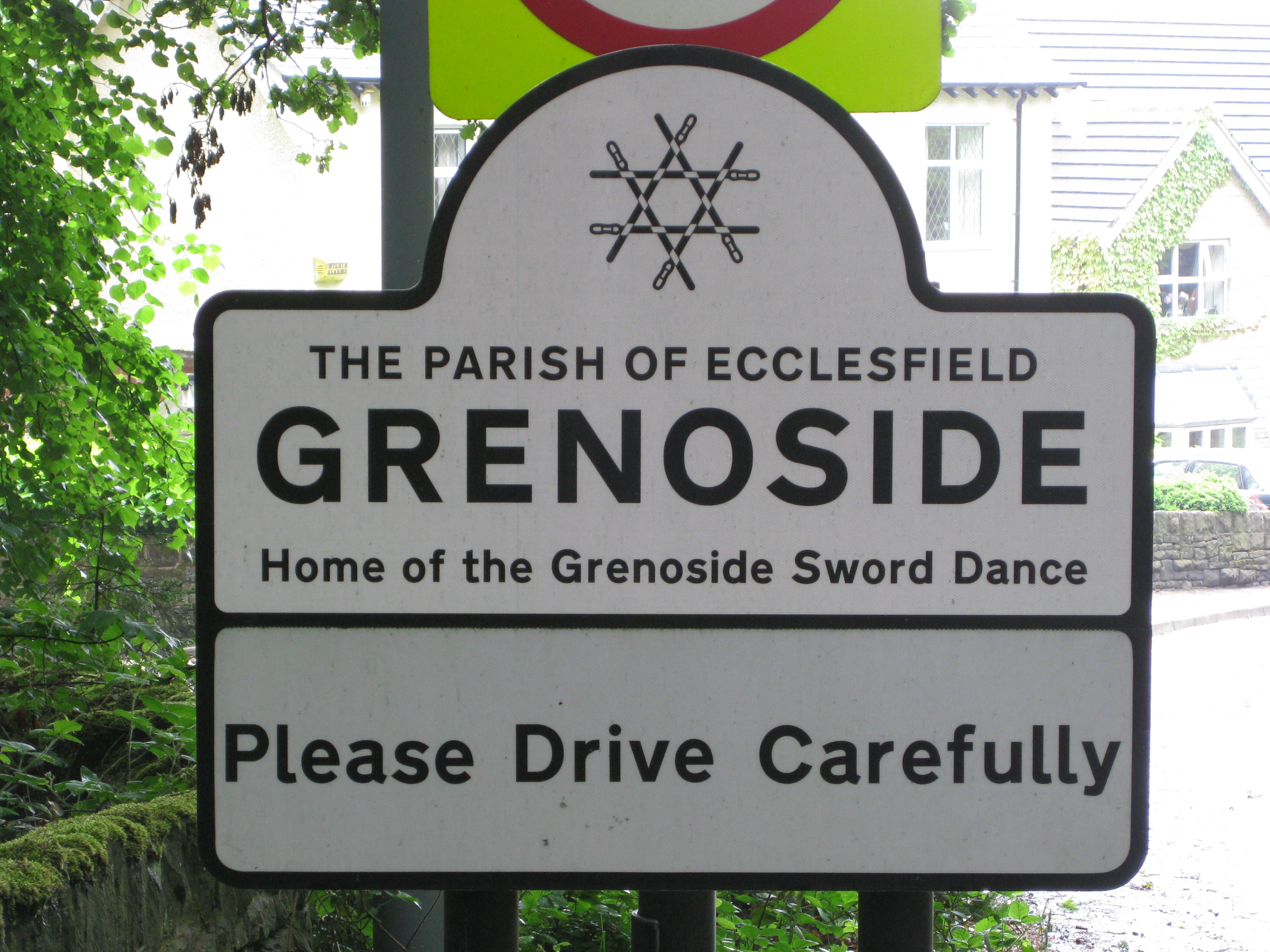
Entry Sign: Main Street

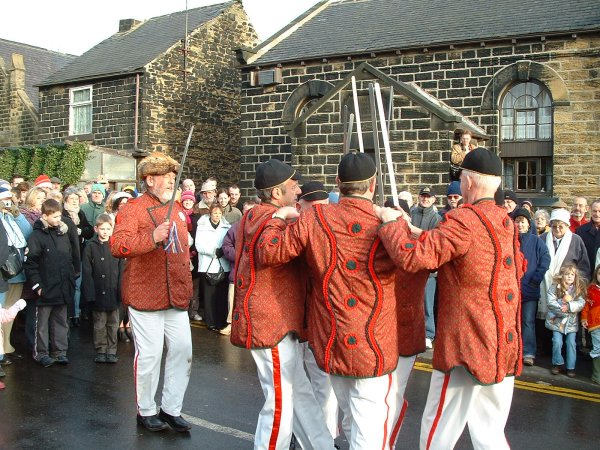
Grenoside Sword Dance

The Grenoside Sword Dance forms an important mid-winter ritual for the village and can be traced back to the 1750s. It is traditionally performed on Boxing Day morning in Main Street.

There is an Anglican church situated on Main Street, St Mark's Church, Grenoside, a Methodist church on Norfolk Hill and St Thomas More Catholic Primary School, on Creswick Lane. The Primary School, originally on the north side of Norfolk Hill, relocated to a new building to the south of the road in 2006. The former infant building on the north side of the road is now semi-derelict. Grenoside's new crematorium, built in 1999 on Skew Hill Lane, was formerly a munitions scrap yard.

Part of Greno Woods is a nature reserve managed by The Wildlife Trust for Sheffield and Rotherham.

== Notable people ==
- Wallace Birch, a professional footballer who began his career with local side Grenoside Sports
- Bob Jackson, later Archdeacon of Walsall, was Vicar of St Mark, Grenoside 1984-92
- Helen Sharman, the first British astronaut
- Paul Joseph Watson, a conspiracy theorist associated with InfoWars
- Geoffrey Whitehead, an actor.
- Jon McClure, lead singer of Reverend and the Makers.
