= A6187 road =

Secondary route in the Peak District, Derbyshire, United Kingdom

A6187

Route information
- Length: 14 mi (23 km)

Major junctions
- West end: Castleton, Derbyshire
- A6013 A625
- East end: Fox House, Sheffield

Location
- Country: United Kingdom
- Constituent country: England

Road network
- Roads in the United Kingdom; Motorways; A and B road zones

The A6187 is a secondary route in the Peak District, Derbyshire and South Yorkshire, England. It starts in Castleton, runs in an easterly direction past Fox House Inn where it joins the A625 road. It is 13.6 miles long.

== Route ==
=== Fox House–Hathersage 3.7 miles ===
The route starts at Hathersage Road where the North-most end of Stony Ridge Road joins it on the outskirts of Sheffield, close to Fox House Inn. This was once the location of Stony Ridge Toll Bar, the location being marked with a commemoration stone. At Fox House a separate branch, also designated the A6187 turns off towards Froggatt Edge where it joins the South-most end of Stony Ridge Road. Beyond Fox House the route leading to Hathersage is joined by the B6521 road to Grindleford via Padley Gorge. The A6187 crosses the Burbage Brook, then passes a rock known as Toad's Mouth where it crosses into Derbyshire. The road continues towards Hathersage passing between Owler Tor and Over Owler Tor and then takes a tight curve at Surprise View where the traveller will be greeted with a view of Hope Valley. At this point, where it descends towards the valley bottom it is called Sheffield Road.

=== Hathersage–Hope 4.0 miles ===
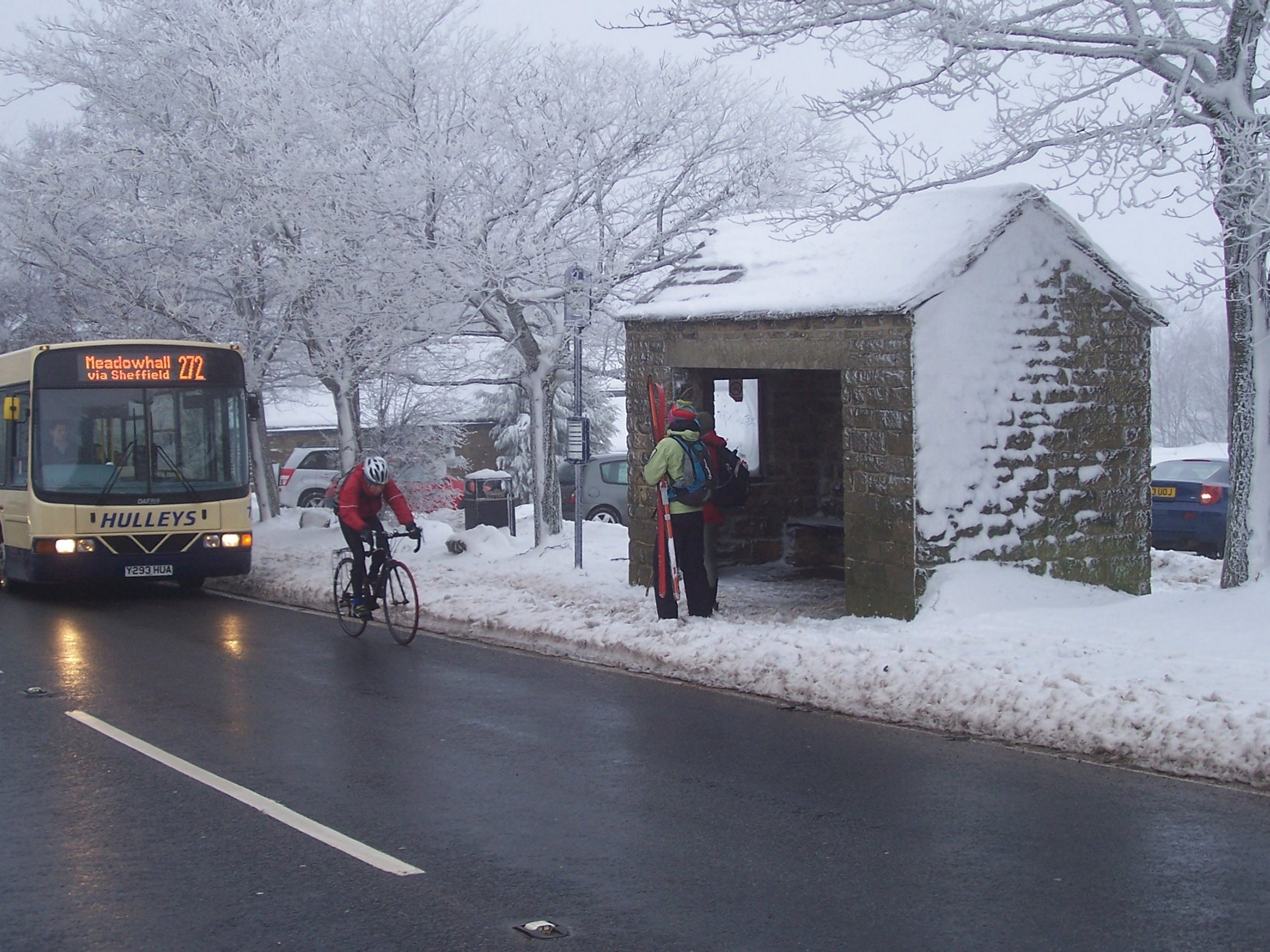
The A6187 at Fox House.

The route continues on a straight route with a cycle lane for a while then it come to a major junction with the A6013 at Bamford continuing to Hope.

=== Hope–Castleton 1.3 miles ===
The route continues to Castleton over the course of 1 mile. It ends at the foot of Winnats Pass.

=== History ===
Historically the road was designated the A625 but was re-designated after frequent landslips where the road ascended Mam Tor, resulting in its closure in 1979. The A625 was re-routed towards Calver via Stony Ridge and Froggatt Edge.
