= Greno Woods =

Woodland in north of England

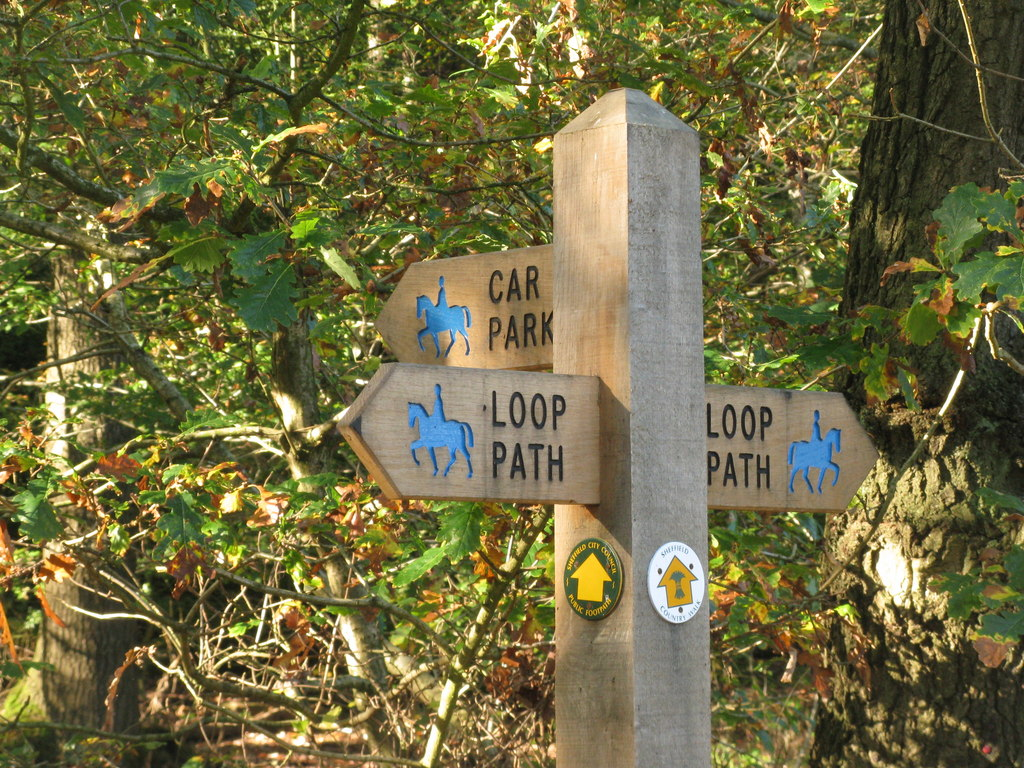
- Signpost in Greno Woods
- Interactive map of Greno Woods
- OS grid: SK329954
- Coordinates: 53.45°N 1.50°W
- Area: 178 hectares (440 acres)
- Manager: Sheffield and Rotherham Wildlife Trust
- Website: www.wildsheffield.com/reserves/greno-woods-reserve/

Greno Woods is a 178 hectares (440 acres) area of ancient woodland and nature reserve located north of Grenoside village, a suburb of Sheffield, South Yorkshire, England. Previously used as a quarry, hunting ground, and for commercial forestry; it is now used for recreational walking, jogging and mountain biking.

== Ecology ==
The woodland existed as early as 1600, some its oldest trees include oak, beech and sweet chestnut.

Scots pine and larch were planted when the woods were used for commercial forestry in the 19th century. Non-native conifers were planted in the 1950s but Sheffield Wildlife Trust now have a program of felling the conifer plantations and encouraging more of the native broad-leaf trees. 24 disease-resistant English elms were planted in 2018, as part of an initiative to combat dutch elm disease.

A spring 2015 survey by RSPB observed a variety of birds in Greno Woods including wrens, robins, chaffinches, blue tits, great spotted woodpeckers, great tits and spotted flycatchers. The woods are also a habitat for badgers, roe deer, brown hares and common lizards. Wildflowers including bluebell, ramsons and greater stitchwort are also found there.

== Uses ==
Greno Woods was used for the quarrying of Grenoside Sandstone, as a hunting ground for deer, and for commercial forestry in the 19th century.

Modern-day uses are mostly recreational: Greno Woods is a popular spot for walking and jogging. It is located on the Trans Pennine Trail and features many footpaths and bridleways. In 2018 an 'Enchanted Forest Trail' was constructed, with the intention of encouraging toddlers and young children to explore nature.

Greno Woods also hosts a popular mountain biking event, 'Peaty's Steel City Downhill', founded by professional biker Steve Peat.
