= Hope Valley, Derbyshire =

Valley in Derbyshire, England

Coordinates: 53°20′50″N 1°44′44″W

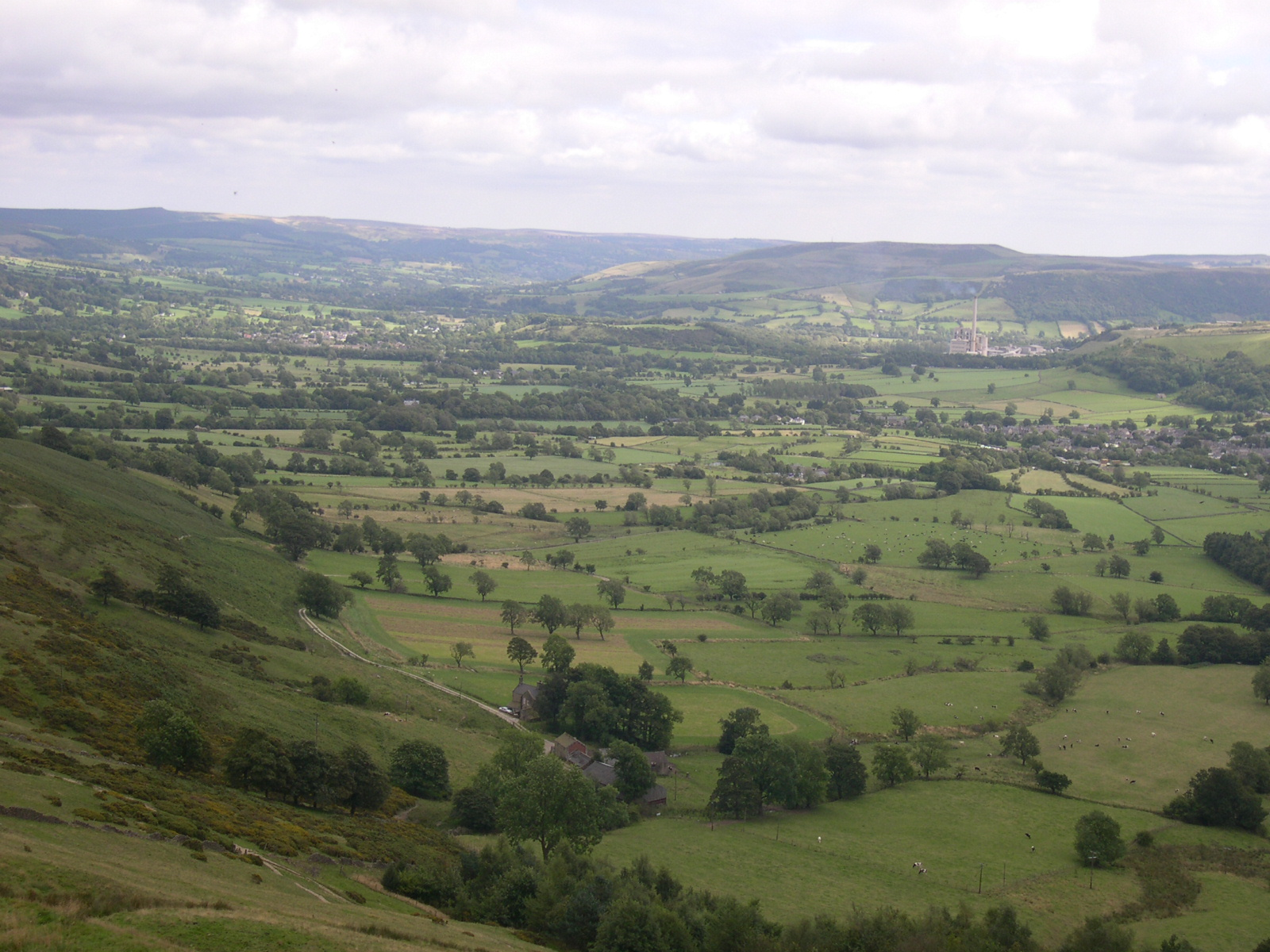
The Hope Valley viewed from Mam Tor

The Hope Valley is a rural area centred on the village of Hope, Derbyshire, in the Peak District in the northern Midlands of England.

The name also applies to the post town that includes the surrounding villages.

== Valley ==
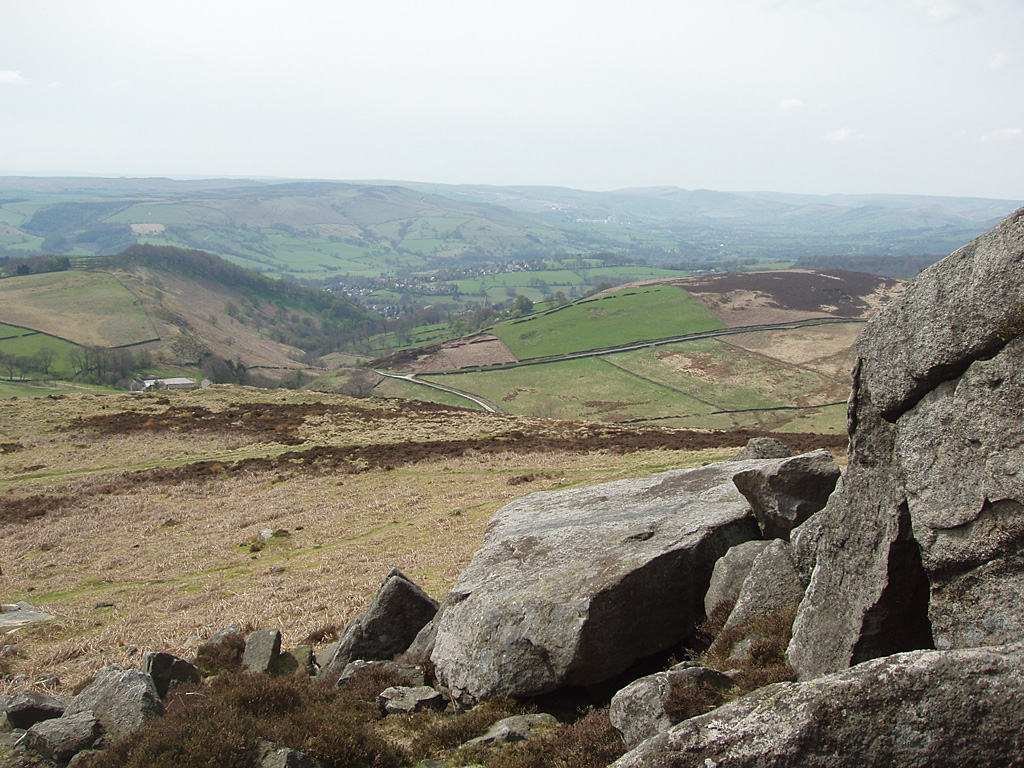
Looking over Hathersage from Higger Tor

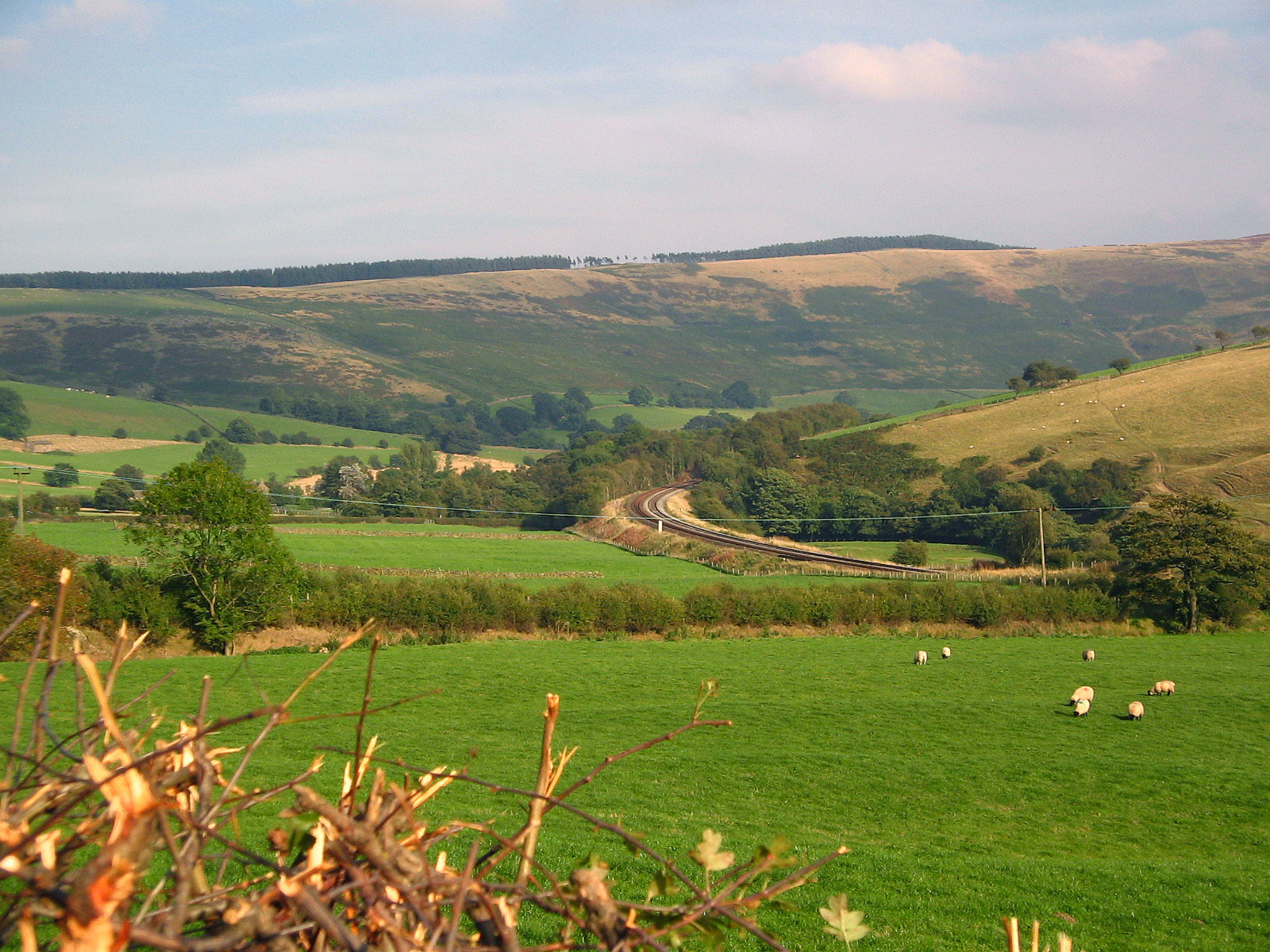
Hope Valley, between Edale and Hope, with the Hope Valley Line visible

Although the Hope Valley appears to be a single valley, the name of the river changes several times. The head of the valley lies below Mam Tor at Castleton, widely regarded as the capital of the valley. From here, the Peakshole Water flows to Hope, where it enters the lower reaches of the River Noe, which has flowed from Edale. The Noe then flows to Shatton near Bamford, before entering the River Derwent, which has travelled about ten miles from Bleaklow. The valley is now technically the Derwent Valley, but the term "Hope Valley" is still used as the Derwent flows through Hathersage and Grindleford. Other streams in the area include the Burbage Brook, which runs down from Burbage Valley through Padley Gorge and into the River Derwent near Grindleford station.

The area is a popular tourist destination, particularly as the Hope Valley Line railway from Sheffield to Manchester runs through it, from the western end of the Totley Tunnel near Grindleford to the eastern end of the Cowburn Tunnel near Edale.

In the centre of the valley is a long-established cement factory, the UK's biggest, run by Hope Construction Materials. It is somewhat infamous locally because it is a prominent industrial operation in the middle of a National Park and is very visible from many locations. However, the factory provides valuable local employment outside the tourism sector.

The Hope Valley College is the only secondary school in the Hope Valley. Castleton Church of England Primary School (one of several primary schools in the valley) and the surrounding area was featured in Channel 4's new (in October 2017) ident which shows images of the valley from Mam Tor.

== History ==
There is evidence that Hope has been extremely significant in the region throughout its long history. The village is mentioned in the Domesday Book of 1086 as having both a priest and a church, the only place in north Derbyshire to have such status at the time. St. Peter's Church, opposite the Old Hall public house, dates from around the 13th century.

The parish of Hope covered two thirds of the Royal Hunting Forest of north Derbyshire and was one of the largest parishes in the country. From earlier times there are traces of a Roman fort at Brough, just to the east of the village. Its Roman name Navio was later replaced with the Old English word for fort, Brough. Many ancient relics from the site can be seen in Buxton Museum. It is thought that the fort was probably built to protect Roman lead-mining interests in the Peak District.

The village is built on the A6187 Sheffield to Castleton road, near the junction of the B6049 that runs northward from Tideswell to Edale. This minor road closely follows the route of the old Portway, which was an ancient trading route used by Jaggers, a local term for men driving packhorses carrying salt and other goods from Cheshire. Names such as Saltergate Lane and Jaggers Lane probably originate from this period.

== Post town ==
The Hope Valley post town lies in the postal area of Sheffield. It encompasses the S32 and S33 postal districts, and includes the following villages:

- Bamford
- Bradwell
- Brough
- Calver
- Castleton
- Edale
- Eyam
- Grindleford
- Hathersage
- Hope
- Stoney Middleton
