= Padley Gorge =

Valley in Derbyshire, England

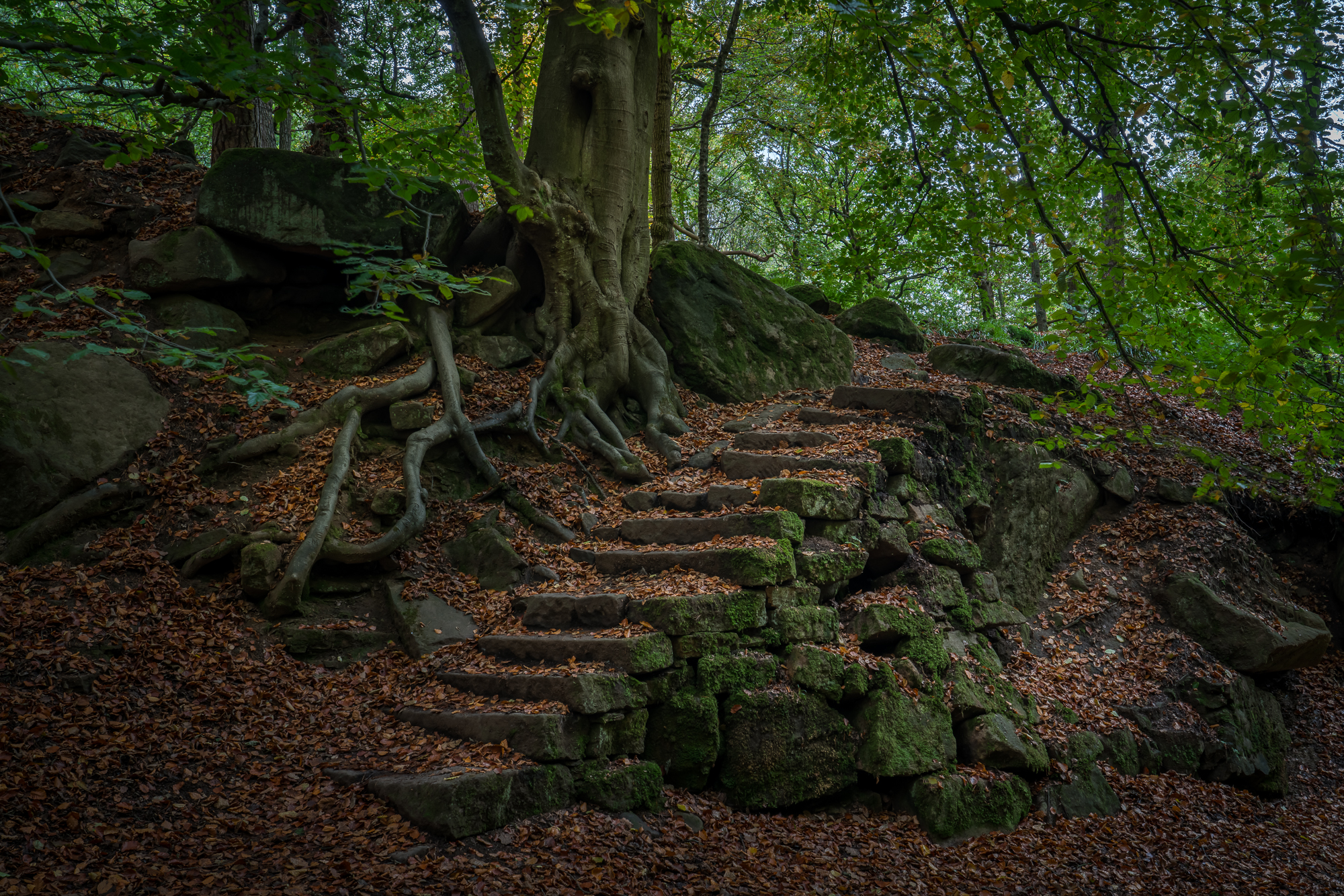
- The root of the steps

Geography
- Location: Peak District, Derbyshire
- Coordinates: 53.3055°N 1.6248°W
- River: Burbage Brook
- Interactive map of Padley Gorge

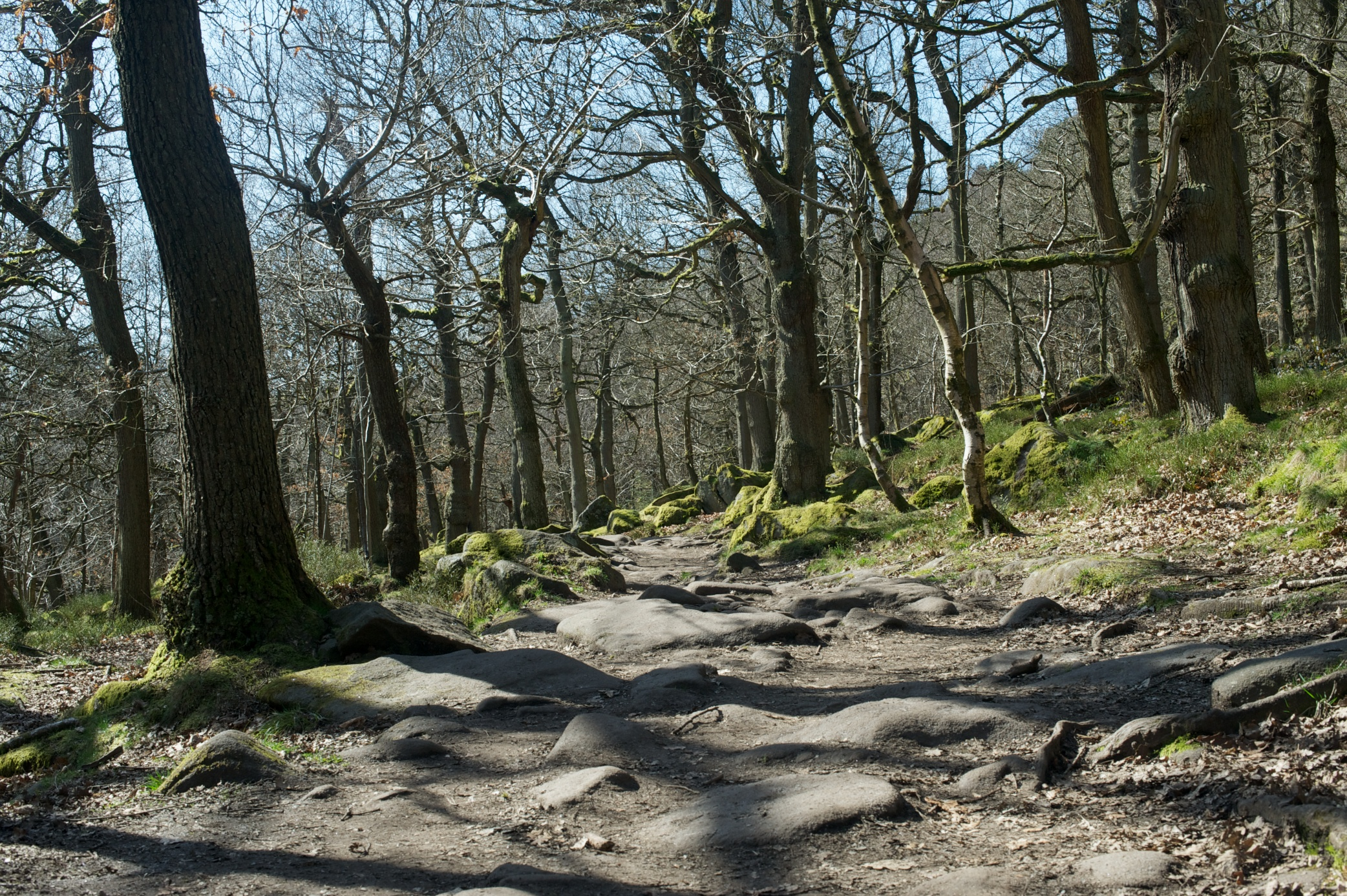
Padley Gorge path

Padley Gorge is a deep but narrow valley in the Peak District, Derbyshire between the village of Grindleford and the A6187 road.

The gorge is wooded with a stream, the Burbage Brook. This stream used to form the boundary between Derbyshire and Yorkshire, but the boundary now follows the Hathersage Road, the A6187, formerly the A625.

It is one of the furthest inland examples of temperate rainforest in the UK.

The gorge begins near Grindleford Station at a stile where a post has been installed. Although the valley continues up towards Hathersage Road and Burbage, the gorge finishes at the edge of the woodland. Padley Gorge forms the backbone of several walks in the area and the railway station approach road forms a convenient car park for walkers.

A short distance from the upper section of the gorge is the Fox House, a pub and hotel on the road to Sheffield. Longshaw Estate is equally close and its lands include the gorge. The lands to the north and east of the gorge are moorland with relics of stone circles, for example the Stoke Flatt stone circle on Froggatt Edge and Bronze Age field system at Swine Sty.

The valley is part of the Yarncliff Wood, Padley Site of Special Scientific Interest (SSSI), designated in 1972 as "the best example of the remnant oak-birch woodland that once covered much of the edges of the gritstone uplands of the Peak District". The citation mentions three species of Umbilicaria lichen said to be very rare in the Midlands, and describes the site as a breeding site for pied flycatcher, wood warbler and hawfinch.

Padley Gorge is a popular tourist spot, and as of May 2020 has a five-star rating on TripAdvisor.
