= St Mark's Church, Grenoside =

Church in South Yorkshire, England

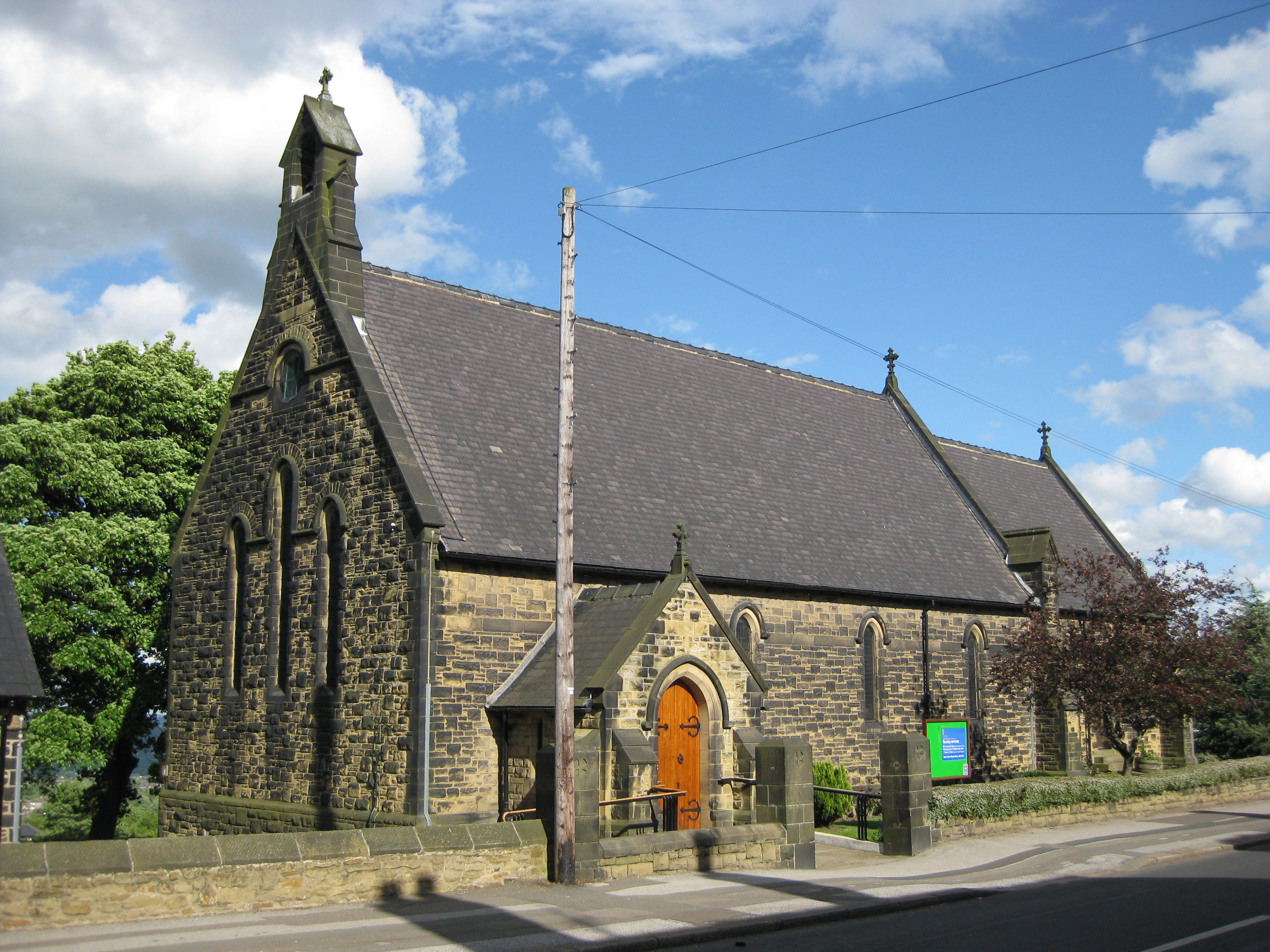
- St Mark's Church, west side
- St Mark's Church, Grenoside
- 53.4412°N 1.5017°W
- Denomination: Church of England
- Churchmanship: Broad Church
- Website: www.stmarksgrenoside.net

History
- Dedication: St Mark

Administration
- Province: York
- Diocese: Sheffield
- Parish: Grenoside

St. Mark's Church is an Anglican parish church in Grenoside, South Yorkshire, England. It is in the Deanery of Ecclesfield, and was built in 1884.

Regular Sunday services are at 10:00am. Hospitality, fellowship and food are a speciality; first Sunday of each month breakfast is served to all-comers from 9.45am. Other groups for adults and children meet at different times through the week.

St Mark's is a venue for Christian weddings, funerals and baptisms.

The church has two Focal Ministers, part-time volunteers who are authorised to lead and serve in the parish. They are Readers (Licensed lay ministers). The Oversight Minister and Priest-in-charge is the Vicar of Ecclesfield.
