= Higger Tor =

Tor in England

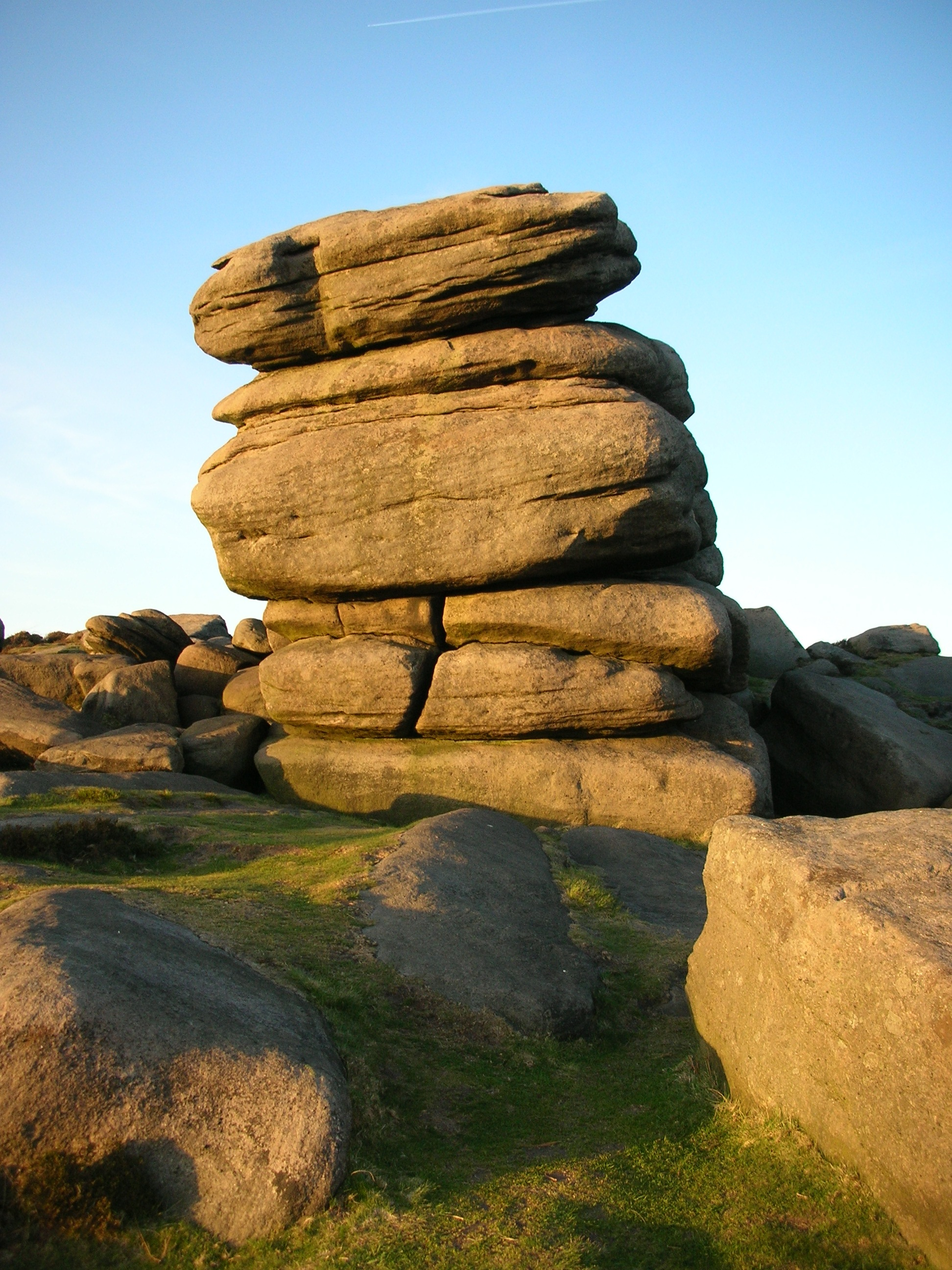
- A millstone grit boulder on Higger Tor

Highest point
- Elevation: 434 m (1,424 ft)
- Coordinates: 53.3338°N 1.6183°W

Geography
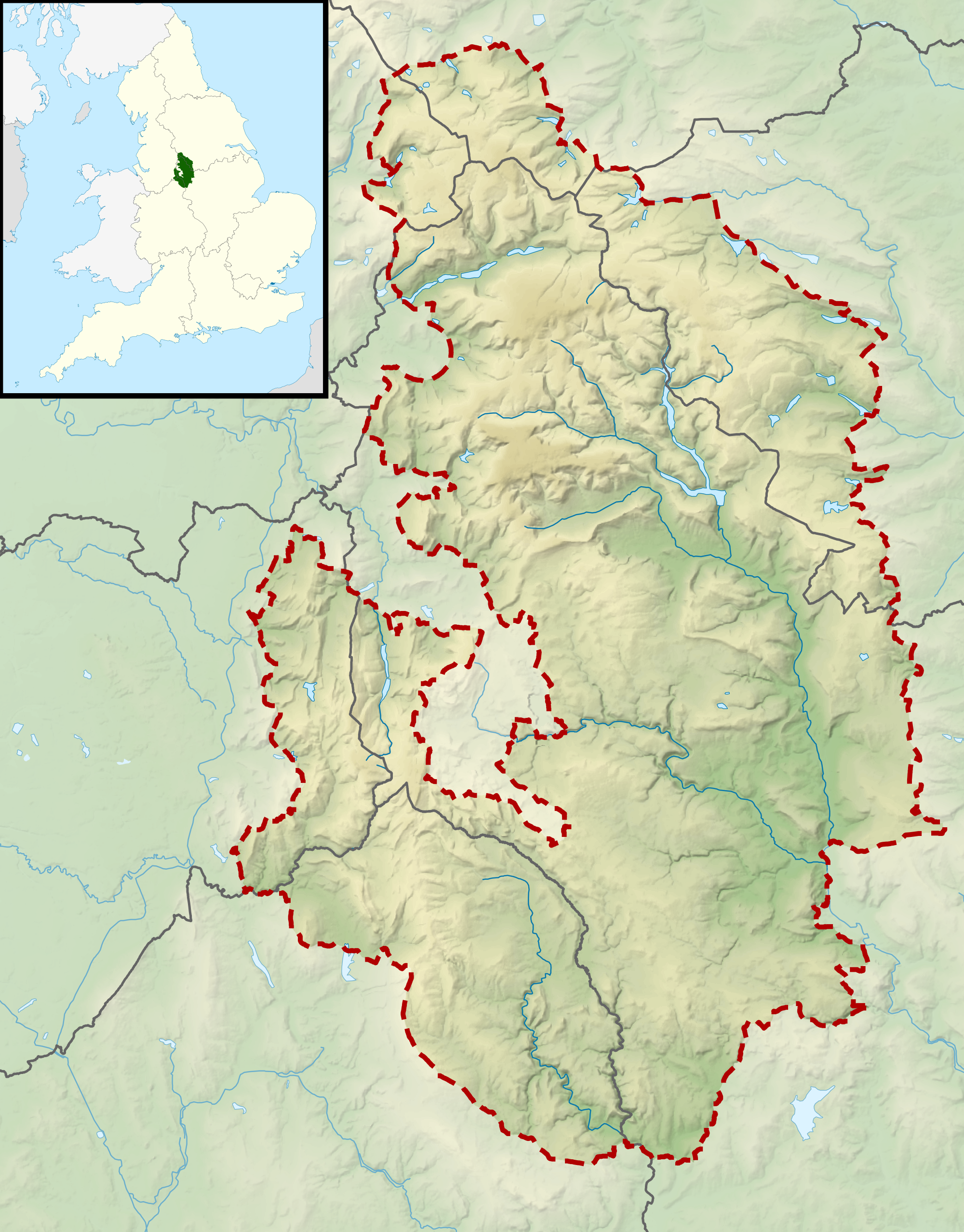
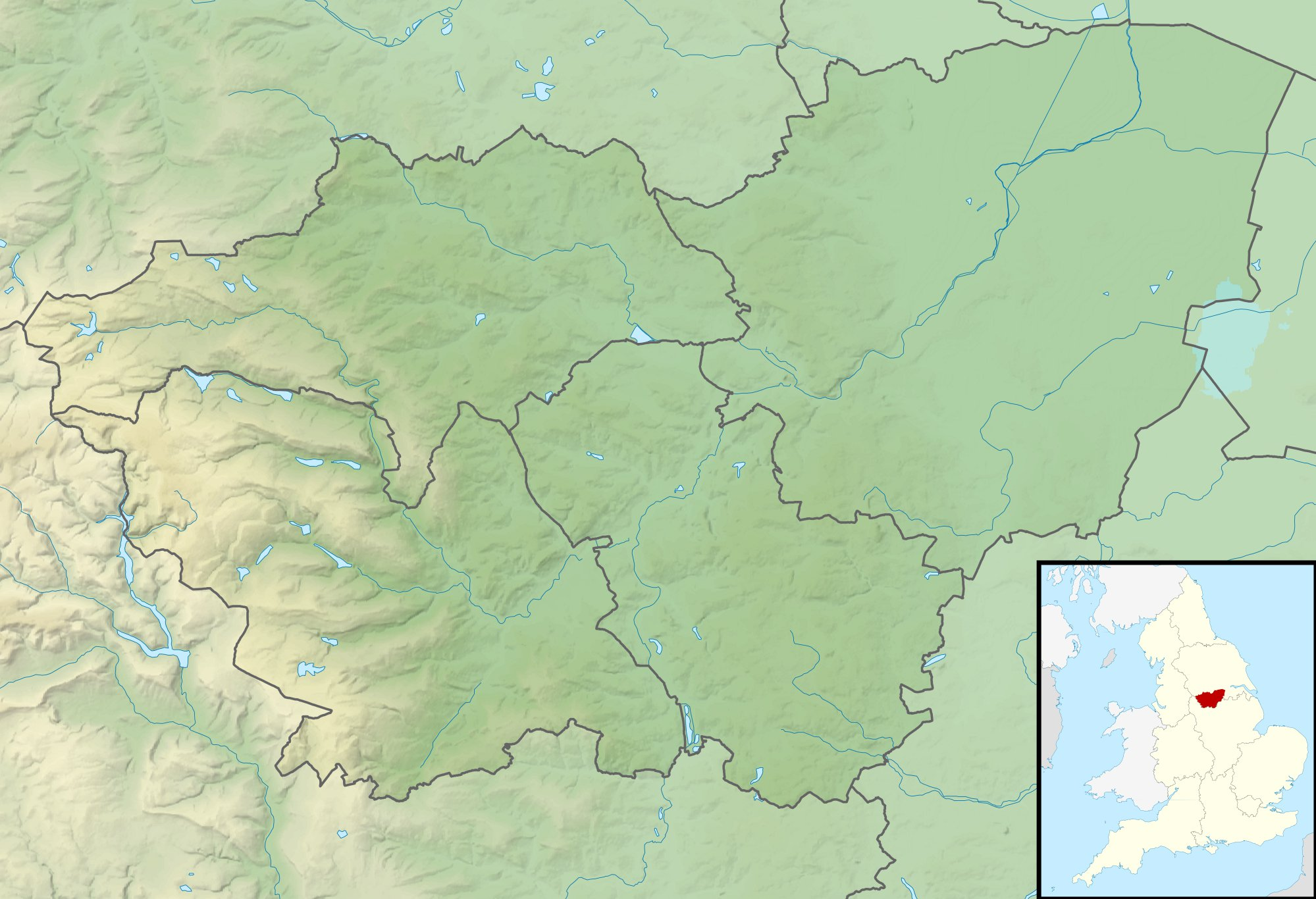
- Location within the Peak District Location within South Yorkshire
- Location: Peak District, England
- OS grid: SK 254 819
- Topo map: OS Landranger 110

Higger Tor or Higgar Tor is a gritstone tor in the Dark Peak, in the north of the Peak District National Park in England. It overlooks the Burbage Valley and the Iron Age hill fort of Carl Wark to the southeast.

The tor stands to the south west of Sheffield, just within the city boundary, about 200 metres (220 yd) east of the border with Derbyshire, which runs along the nearby road to Ringinglow. The village of Hathersage is approximately 2 kilometres (1.2 mi) to the west.

A scene from the 1987 film The Princess Bride was filmed nearby at Carl Wark with Higger Tor visible in the background.

== An Ethel ==
Higger Tor is one of 95 Ethels in the Peak District, named after English environmental campaigner and pioneer of the countryside movement Ethel Haythornthwaite. It is the closest Ethel to the Longshaw Estate.
