= Nature Improvement Area =

UK nature conservation designation

Nature Improvement Areas (NIAs) are a network of large scale initiatives in the landscape of England to improve ecological connectivity and improve biodiversity. They were launched in 2012.

At 2015, the NIAs covered 47,000 acres of England in total, achieved at a total cost of £7.5 million. At spring 2015, the NIAs had also added a further 13,500 acres beyond the initial 2012 areas, as well as a total of 335 miles of new footpaths for public access.

== History ==
The NIAs form part of the UK Government's response to Sir John Lawton's 2010 report "Making Space for Nature". They were then implemented via the Natural Environment White Paper, the first natural environment government White Paper in 20 years. In October 2011 a competition was launched by DEFRA to select twelve pilot sites for NIAs, and in response seventy-six entries were made. On 27 February 2012 the final list of 12 Nature Improvement Areas was announced. The NIAs were launched in 2012 they run with the aid of Local Nature Partnerships and around 11,000 local volunteers.

== List of Nature Improvement Areas ==
The first twelve Nature Improvement Areas in England are:

Birmingham and Black Country Living Landscapes
Includes urban, wetland, river and heath habitats. It will create heathland on brownfield sites and 40 hectares of new native woodland;
Dark Peak
Includes moorland and woodland in the north of the Peak District National Park. It will restore habitats such as upland heathland and create 210 hectares of native woodland, such as that at Burbage Brook;
Dearne Valley Green Heart
Mostly on farmland and former mining settlements with woodland and wetland. It will restore the River Don floodplain and create new wetlands and woodlands
Greater Thames Marshes
Includes agricultural marsh and urban habitats. It will create and enhance grazing marsh, salt marsh and mudflat habitats;
Humberhead Levels
Straddling Yorkshire, Lincolnshire and Nottinghamshire, it is mainly wetland, lowland and peat habitats. It will create or restore at least 1,427 hectares of wetland habitat;
Marlborough Downs
This is predominantly a farmer-led partnership looking to restore chalk and grassland habitats and increase the numbers of farmland birds as well as creating a network of traditional clay-lined dewponds to act as wildlife havens;
Meres and Mosses of the Marches
Incorporates wetlands, peat bogs and ponds in Cheshire. It will aim to reduce diffuse pollution by working with farmers, improve peatlands and restore wildlife areas around the River Perry;
Morecambe Bay Limestones and Wetlands
The most northerly NIA, this consists of limestone, wetland and grassland habitats. It will restore coast and freshwater wetlands and create 200 hectares of woodland, planting 10,000 native trees and develop habitat for six species;
Nene Valley
Within the River Nene regional park, this project will work with farmers to restore habitats and restore tributaries and reaches of the River Nene;
Northern Devon
This incorporates river, woodland and grassland. The project will recreate and restore 1,000 hectares of priority habitat and restore the much wider catchment area of the River Torridge so that it can support the critically endangered freshwater pearl mussel;
South Downs Way Ahead
Encompasses key chalk sites of the South Downs National Park. The NIA will restore 1,000 hectares of chalk grassland and encourage the return of the Duke of Burgundy butterfly and several species of farmland birds;
Wild Purbeck
Purbeck a variety of river, wetland, heath and woodland habitat as well as the largest onshore oil field in Western Europe. This NIA will introduce livestock to manage heathland, restore wetland and create or restore 15 ponds as well as creating 120 hectares of new woodland and a new seven hectare saline lagoon.
