= Hieracium naviense =

Scientific classification
- Kingdom: Plantae
- Clade: Tracheophytes
- Clade: Angiosperms
- Clade: Eudicots
- Clade: Asterids
- Order: Asterales
- Family: Asteraceae
- Genus: Hieracium
- Species: H. naviense

Binomial name
- Hieracium naviense J.N.Mills

Species of flowering plant

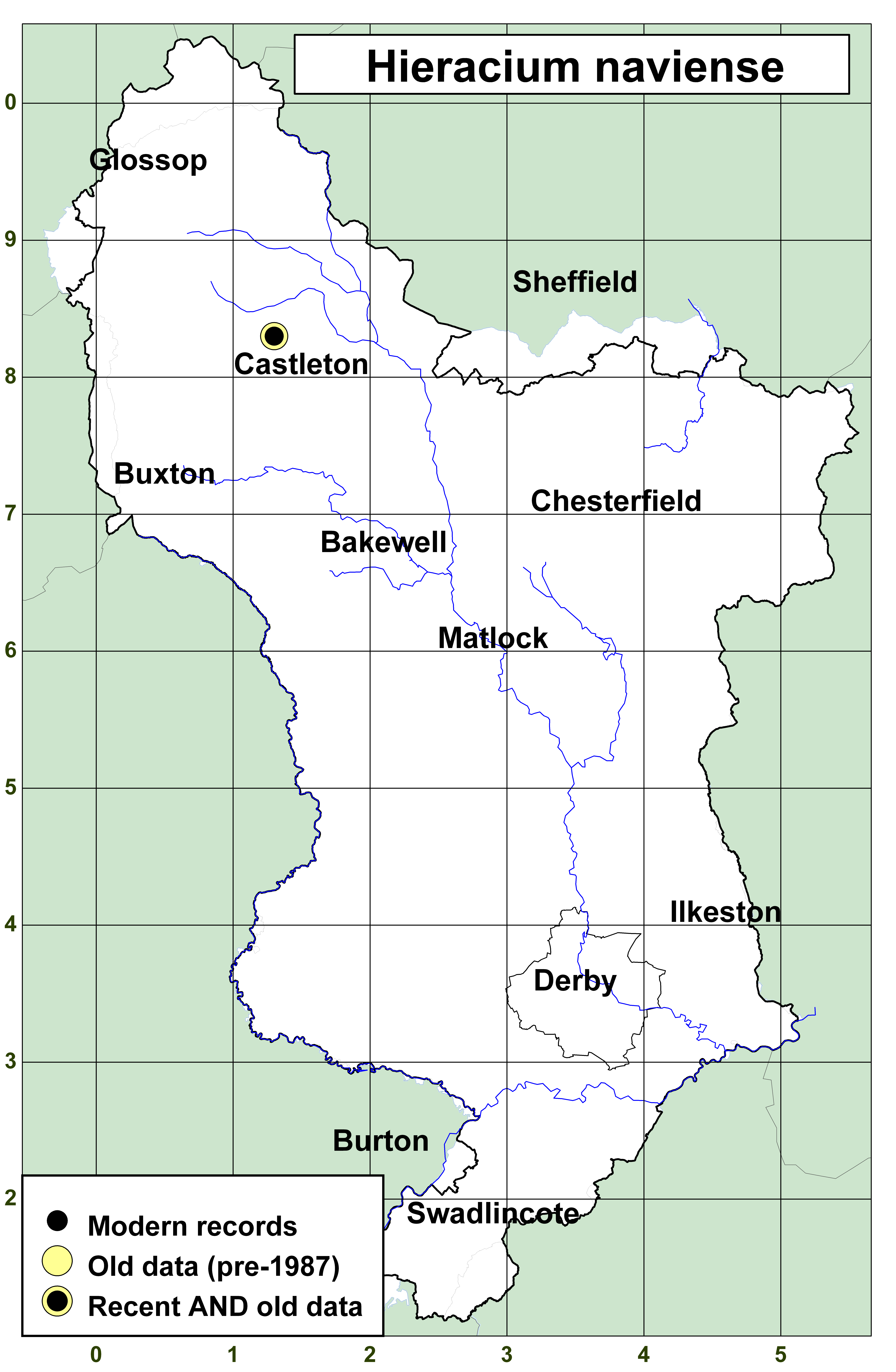
Map of Derbyshire showing the only known location for H.naviense

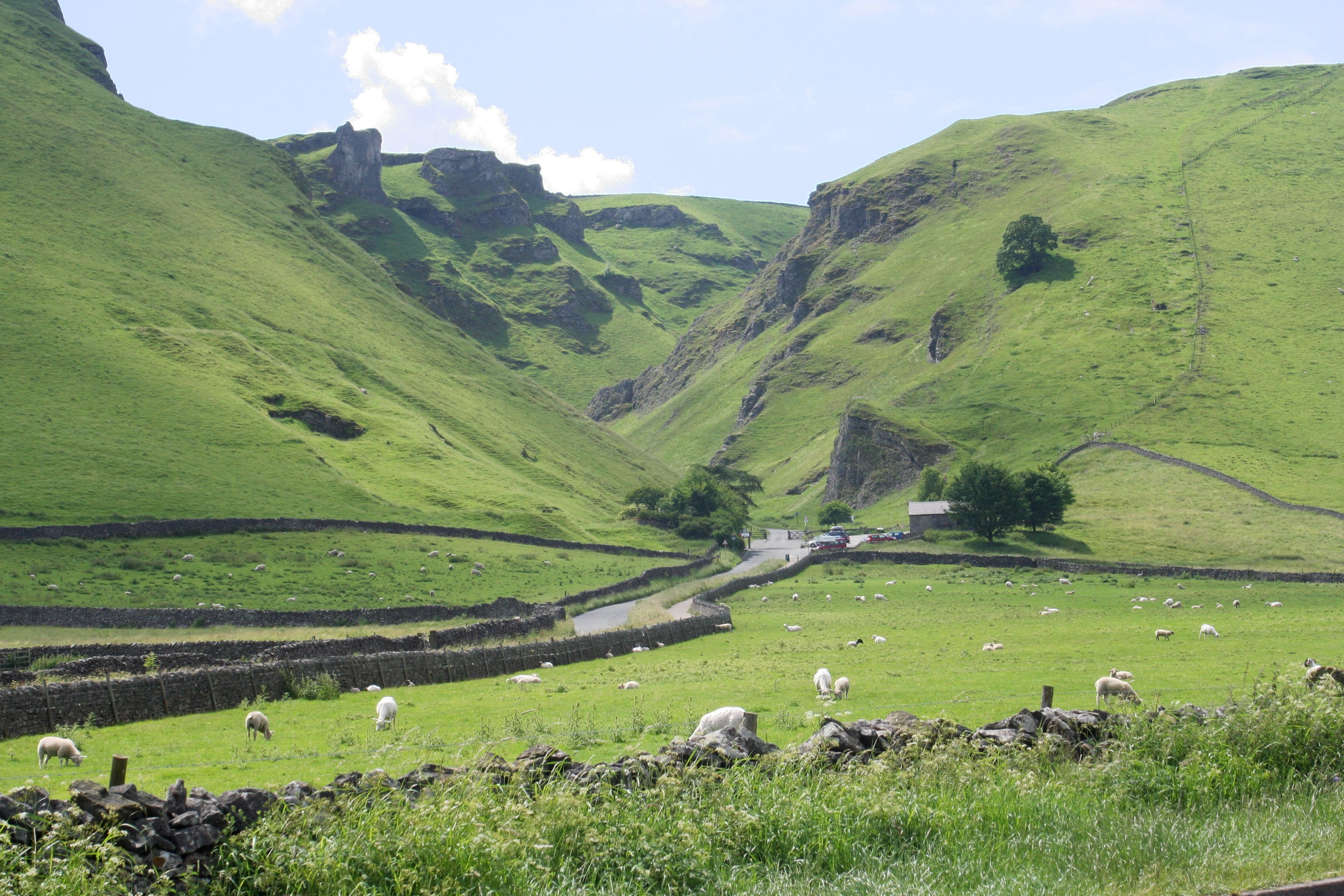
Winnats Pass, Castleton, Derbyshire

Hieracium naviense is a very rare species of hawkweed which has been given the common name of Derby hawkweed.

It is a native perennial plant of limestone cliffs, first discovered in Derbyshire, England, at Winnats Pass (SK1382) by J.N. Mills in 1966, and described by him as a new species in 1968. According to The Flora of Derbyshire, it has been refound there on a number of occasions since, including in 1981 by UK hawkweed expert P.D. Sell, who declared it "a good species".

Like many apomictic species of Hieracium, it has an extremely localised distribution and requires specialist knowledge to recognise it. Apart from the two limestone cliffs found within a single 1 km square in the Derbyshire Peak District, it has never been recorded anywhere else in Britain, or indeed the world. The only other vascular plant endemic to Derbyshire (i.e. found nowhere else) is the bramble Rubus durescens.

== Conservation status ==
This endemic plant species was previously regarded as being Nationally Rare (NR) and Vulnerable (VR) in the national UK conservation list but its status was upgraded to the IUCN-defined conservation category of Critically Endangered (CR) in England's Vascular Plant Red List, first published in 2014.
