= Fox House, South Yorkshire =

Public house in South Yorkshire, South Yorkshire, England

Coordinates: 53.321°N 1.591°W

Fox House
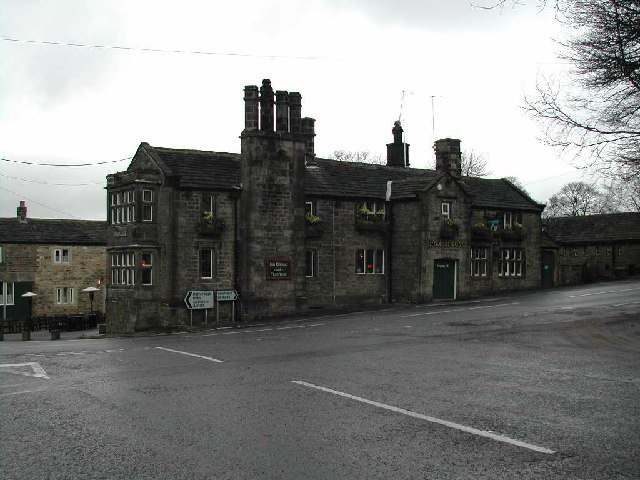
- Fox House Public House

- Location within South Yorkshire
- OS grid reference: SK272805
- Metropolitan borough: Sheffield
- Metropolitan county: South Yorkshire
- Region: Yorkshire and the Humber
- Country: England
- Sovereign state: United Kingdom
- Post town: Sheffield
- Postcode district: S11
- Dialling code: 01433
- Police: South Yorkshire
- Fire: South Yorkshire
- Ambulance: Yorkshire

Fox House is a 17th-century Grade-II listed Inn, located near the Longshaw Estate in the Peak District, near the border between South Yorkshire and Derbyshire in northern England. The building is situated on the A6187 road.

The inn was named for Mr Fox of Callow Farm in Highlow.

Nearby on Houndkirk Moor, a starfish site, an illuminated night-time decoy, was created during the Second World War to simulate Sheffield and divert German bomber attacks.
