= Blacka Moor Nature Reserve =

Nature Reserve in Sheffield, South Yorkshire, England

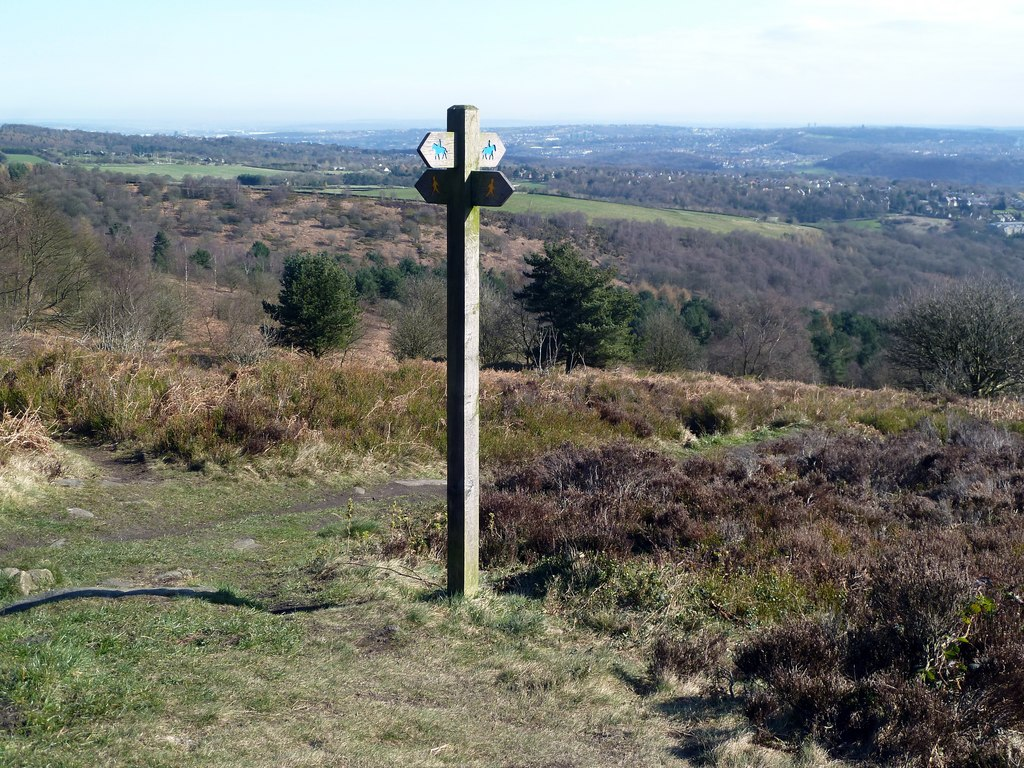
- Bridleway on Blacka Moor

- Location within England
- Location: South Yorkshire
- Nearest city: Sheffield
- Coordinates: 53.320°N 1.571°W
- Area: 181 ha (450 acres)
- Governing body: Peak District National Park Authority

Blacka Moor Nature Reserve is a nature reserve located on Hathersage Road between Sheffield and Hathersage in the Peak District National Park in the United Kingdom. The site is managed by the Wildlife Trust for Sheffield and Rotherham.

The site was gifted by John George Graves to the City of Sheffield.

== Wildlife ==
The reserve features various varieties of heather, and migrant bird species including cuckoos, willow warblers, blackcaps, wheatears, pied flycatchers, and stonechats.
