= A625 road =

Rural A road connecting Derbyshire and the Peak District

A625

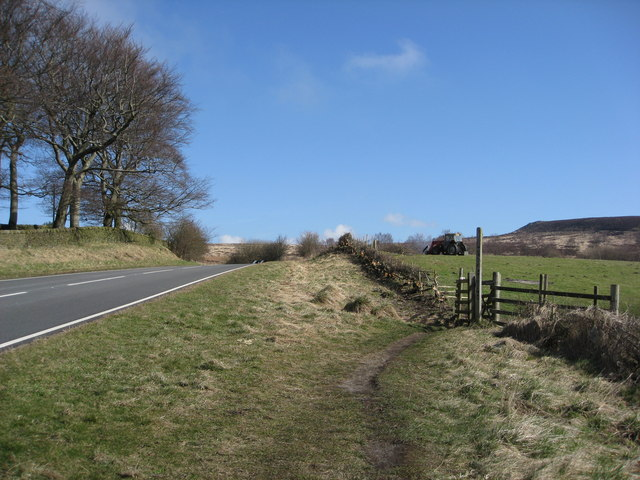
- The A625 near the Grouse Inn in the Peak District

Route information
- Length: 11.8 mi (19.0 km)

Major junctions
- northeast end: 53.3738°N 1.4795°W; Sheffield
- A61 A6187 A623
- southwest end: 53.2700°N 1.6430°W; Calver

Location
- Country: United Kingdom

Road network
- Roads in the United Kingdom; Motorways; A and B road zones

The A625 is a rural road which runs through north Derbyshire and the Peak District in England.

== Route ==
First named Ecclesall Road, it begins at the Moore Street roundabout in Sheffield and runs southwesterly towards Hathersage after a change in name to Hathersage Road, crossing from South Yorkshire into Derbyshire. It separates from the A6187 road 3.5 mi (5.6 km) east of Hathersage and continues to Calver where it finishes at a crossroads with the B6001 and A623 road.

== History ==
Its course was, until a renumbering in 2000, westerly towards Hope, Castleton and Chapel-en-le-Frith where it joined the A6.

The A625 previously ran, undiverted, between Castleton and Chapel-en-le-Frith, winding its way up the south face of Mam Tor—replacing a much earlier route through the Winnats Pass. This section of the road proved highly prone to landslides, especially after periods of heavy rain, and was in constant need of repair. It was finally abandoned in 1979 and traffic was, once again, directed westwards through the Winnats Pass.

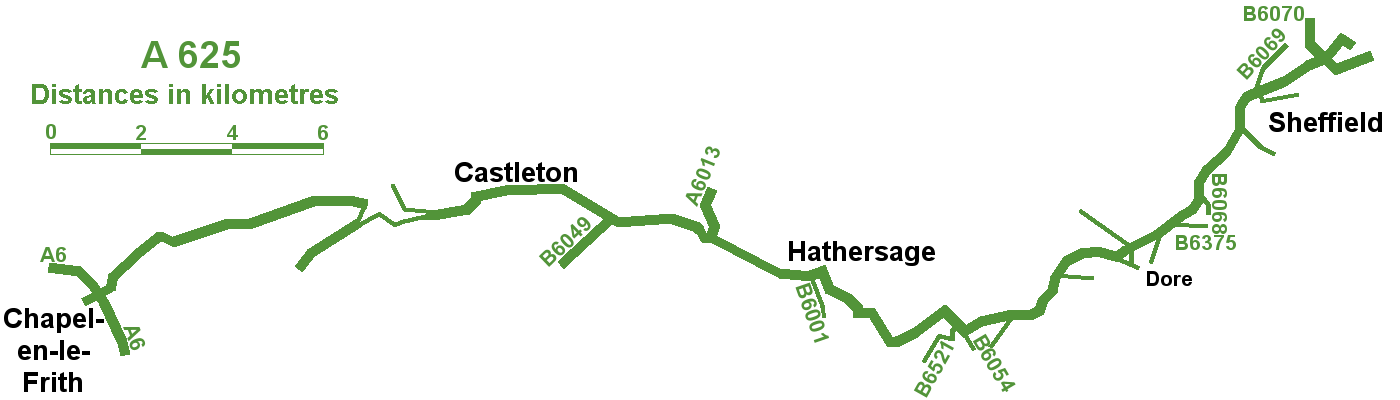
Plan of A625 before 2000.

=== Mam Tor road ===
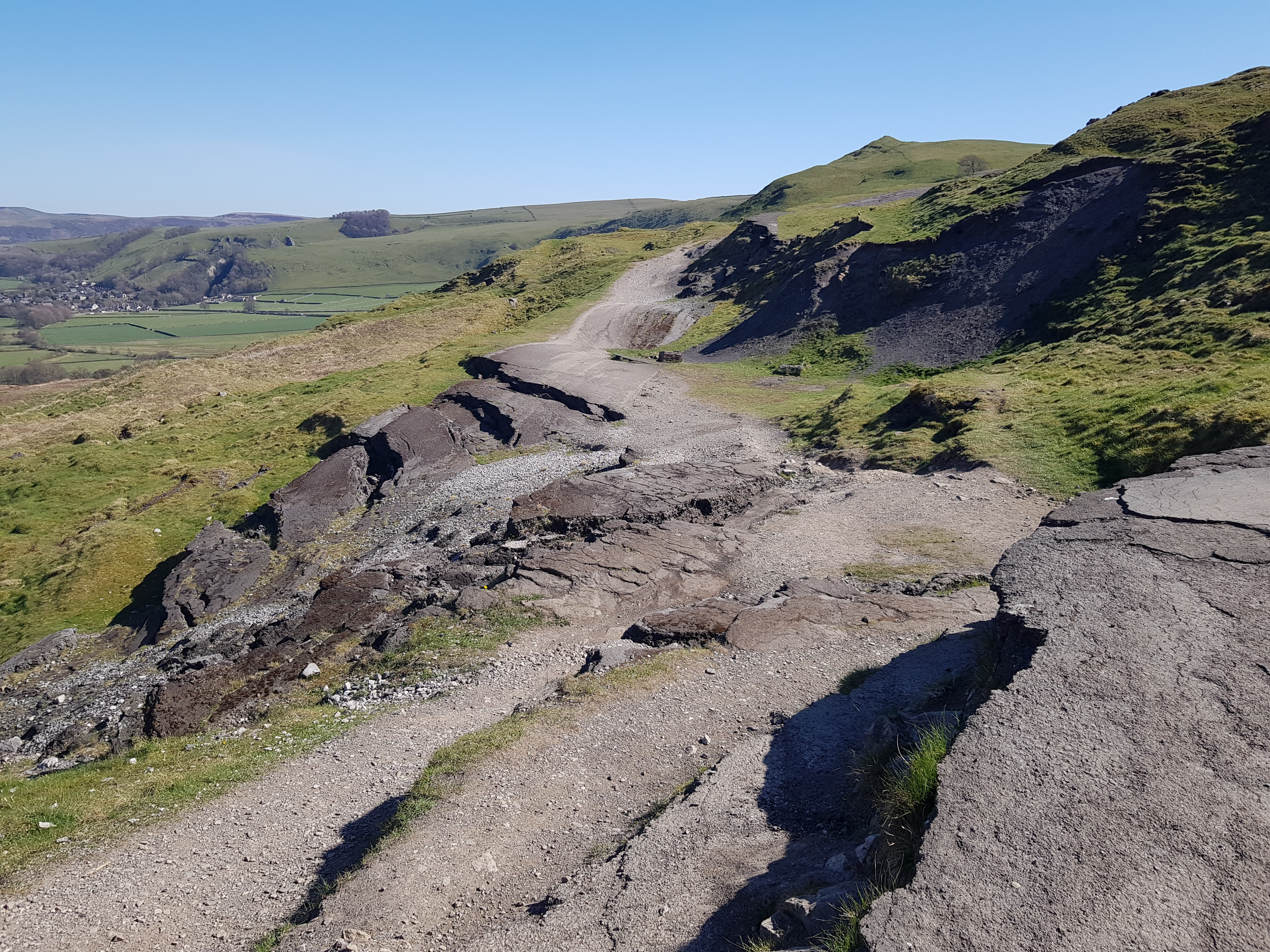
A section of the abandoned road

This section of the road was first constructed in 1819 by the Sheffield & Chapel-en-le-Frith Turnpike Company using spoil from the nearby Odin Mine. It replaced a much earlier, ancient packhorse route, running through the Winnats Pass. Also known locally as "The New Road", the new section was set at an easier gradient than the earlier Winnats Pass route and crossed the Mam Tor landslide. As a result of further movement of the Mam Tor landslide, major road works were required in 1912, 1933, 1946, 1952 and 1966. On the last occasion, the road was closed for six weeks. In 1974, large parts of the Mam Tor section collapsed during a massive landslide. Additional road works were carried out regularly, when wet years led to further landslides. Finally, the Mam Tor section of the road was abandoned in 1979. Hereafter, traffic was routed through the Winnats Pass to rejoin the A625 at Windy Knoll.

The road's course was altered in 2000 to meet the A623 further east, the old route becoming the A6187.
