= Burbage Brook =

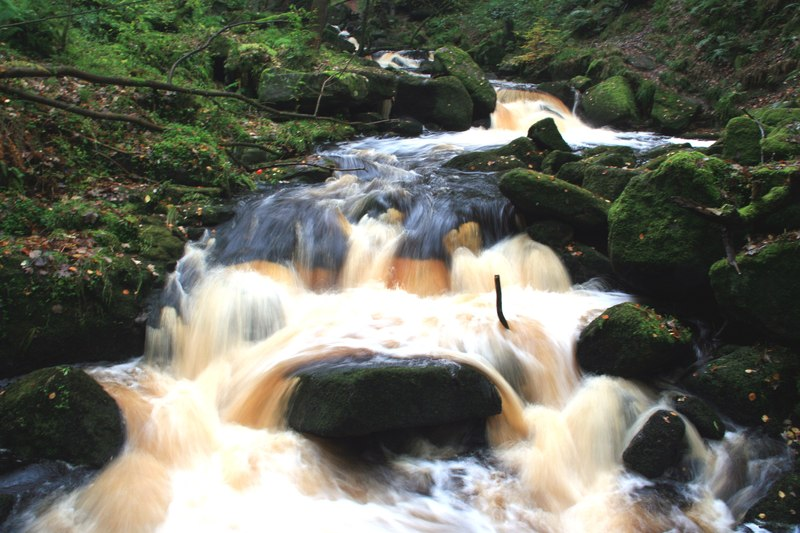
- Burbage Brook in Padley Gorge

- Location of the mouth within Derbyshire

Location
- Country: England
- Region: Derbyshire

Physical characteristics
- Source
  - location: Derbyshire, England
- Mouth
  - location: Derbyshire, England
  - coordinates: 53.302806°N 1.6380°W

Burbage Brook is an upper tributary stream of the River Derwent in the Peak District of England.

== Toponymy ==
The origin of the name is thought to derive from the Germanic baki for creek.

== Course ==
=== White Path Moss ===
The source of the brook is on moorland to the north of the brook's valley in Derbyshire where it drains the land south of Friar's Ridge on White Path Moss, close to Stanage Edge.

=== Burbage Valley ===
Within the first kilometre the altitude of the brook falls just over 60 metres from 396 to 335 metres above sea level. The water enters Burbage Valley and Sheffield at the Upper Burbage Bridge (53°19′21″N 1°36′33″W). It then flows through the Burbage valley and the remains of Burbage conifer plantation, which included Lodgepole pine, Scots pine and Japanese larch. This was planted by Sheffield City Council between 1968 and 1971 with an outline designed to represent Great Britain when viewed from the air. It was sometimes known as the Great Britain Plantation. The West Country was not represented by the plantation due to unexploded ordnance being found where the planting was to have taken place. This is a result of the area around the brook being used as a training ground by British Home Guard and Canadian infantry during World War II. Prior to the planting of trees the area was to have been the site of a reservoir, though this plan was rejected due to unsuitable underlying geology. The plantation was felled following recommendations made in Moors for the Future Report No 8 and on the recommendation of South Yorkshire Fire and Rescue service, with work to remove the trees commencing in August 2014. Parts of the Burbage Valley are a Site of Special Scientific Interest (SSSI) and are home to the water vole, which resulted in a decision to remove the felled trunks by helicopter in order to minimise the environmental impact of the wood's clearance. Stumps of the trees have not been uprooted as the Moors for the Future report suggested that the area covered by the plantation might contain important archaeological remains. The seeds of native trees have been planted in some parts of the former plantation, with the seeds, including those of Sessile Oak, having been gathered from Clough Woodlands on the nearby Longshaw Estate. Work to remove the plantation, funded by the Nature Improvement Areas Programme, is expected to result in an additional area of 14.40 ha of native woodland and 8.58 ha of upland heath around the brook. The valley is overlooked by Higger Tor and Carl Wark to the west and Burbage Rocks to the east, one of the birthplaces of modern British climbing. The Chatsworth gritstone along Burbage Rocks was the source of material for millstones in the past. As it flows out of the remnants of the plantation, the brook passes under a Grade II listed packhorse bridge.

=== Lawrence Field and Padley Gorge ===
It continues down the valley and below the A6187 at (lower) Burbage Bridge, close to a rock feature known as Toad's Mouth and the associated Toad's Mouth prehistoric field system, where it re-enters Derbyshire at Lawrence Field. It then flows into Padley Gorge, Derbyshire, as it passes through the Longshaw Estate. The woodland around the brook, Yarncliff Wood, at this point is also a SSSI and a breeding site for pied flycatcher, wood warbler and hawfinch. At Upper Padley, before it flows into the river Derwent, it flows close to Grindleford railway station and Padley Chapel.

== Artistic representation ==
The brook, as seen from Upper Burbage Bridge was depicted in a painting by artist Stanley Royle in 1919, and again, this time from (lower) Burbage Bridge at an unknown date.

== See also ==
- List of rivers in England
