= Winnats Pass =

Hill pass in the Peak District, England

Coordinates: 53°20′24″N 1°47′55″W

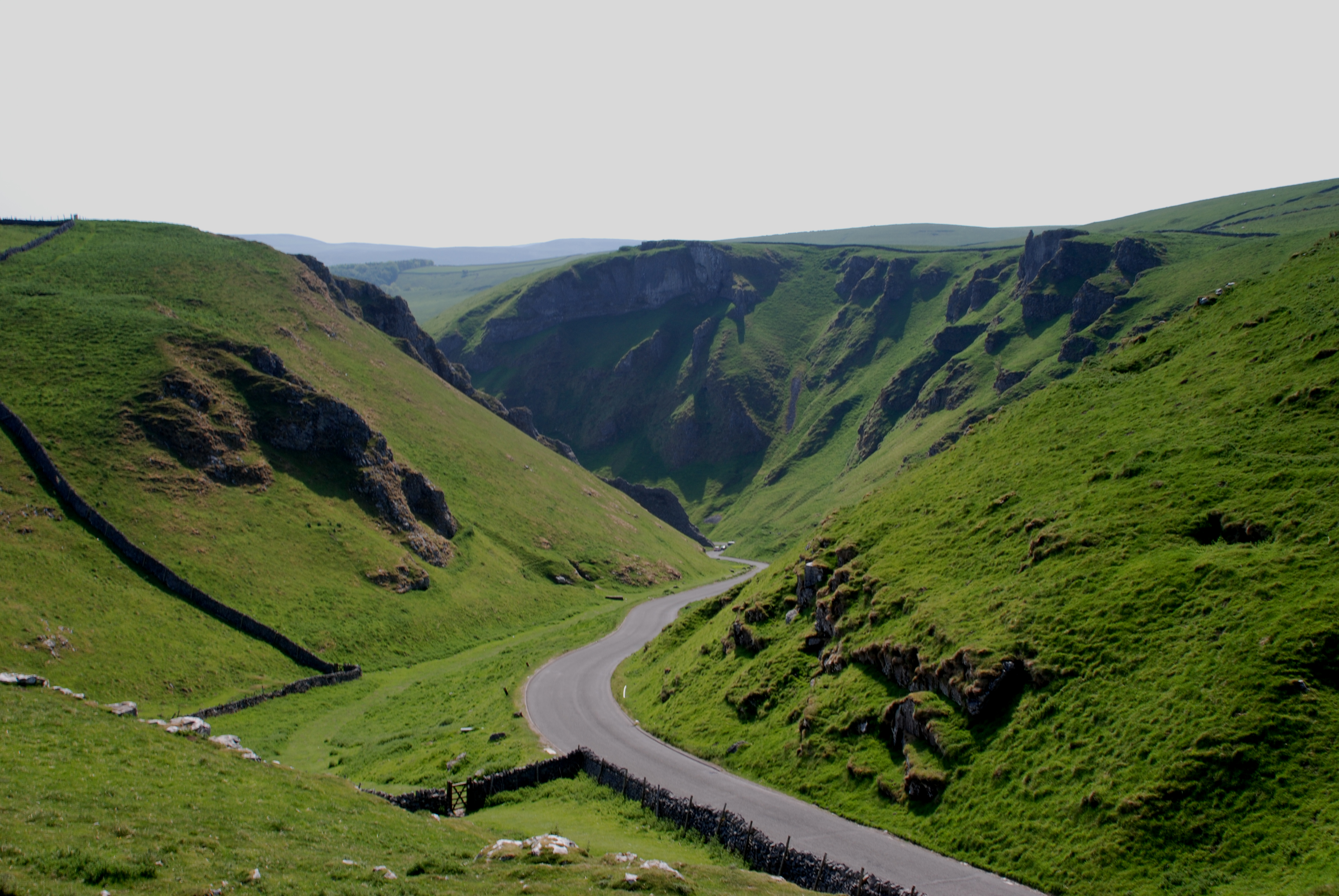
Winnats Pass

Winnats Pass (or Winnats, as shown on some Ordnance Survey maps) is a hill pass and limestone gorge in the Peak District of Derbyshire, England. The name is a corruption of 'wind gates' due to the swirling winds through the pass. It lies west of the village of Castleton, in the National Trust's High Peak Estate and the High Peak borough of Derbyshire. The road winds through a cleft, surrounded by high limestone ridges. At the foot of the pass is the entrance to Speedwell Cavern, a karst cave accessed through a flooded lead mine, and which is a popular tourist attraction.

In the 1930s, Winnats Pass was the location used for annual access rallies in support of greater access to the moorlands or the Peak District, around the time of the Mass Trespass of Kinder Scout. At their peak these were attended by up to 10,000 people.

The permanent closure of the main A625 road at Mam Tor in 1979 due to subsidence has resulted in Winnats Pass being heavily used by road traffic. However, the narrowness of the road and its maximum gradient of over 28% has caused it to be closed to buses, coaches and vehicles over 7.5 tonnes (7.4 long tons; 8.3 short tons) in weight. However a community minibus service (87A) runs on Wednesdays along the road whilst a seasonal sightseeing bus operated by Stagecoach runs through the pass from May to October. The road regularly features in the Tour of the Peak cycle race each autumn.

== Geological formation ==
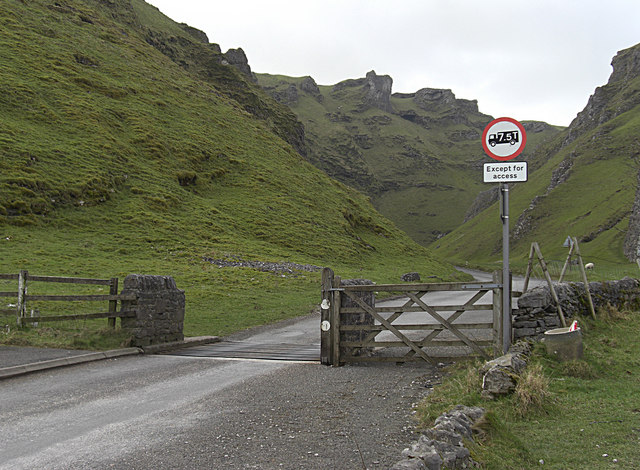
Winnats Pass from the bottom next to Speedwell Cavern

The gorge of Winnats Pass was once thought to have originated as a giant collapsed cavern; however, this idea has since been superseded. Winnats Pass can be seen to cut steeply down through Lower Carboniferous limestone rocks. These were formed approximately 340 million years ago as a reef fringing a shallow lagoon, with deeper water beyond. The presence of a small outcrop of fossiliferous rock (known as 'beach beds') at the base of Winnats Pass, close to Speedwell Cavern, suggests that a contemporary underwater cleft or canyon once existed within the active reef which caused the build up of shelly and crinoidal remains at its base. All these sediments were subsequently buried together under Namurian sandstones and shales in the subsequent Upper Carboniferous period. They were subsequently uplifted, but were only re-exposed by periglacial erosion towards the end of the Pleistocene. Melting water would have flowed along any lines of weakness within the reef limestone, such as those created by the presence of the original underwater cleft in the reef, carving out the gorge seen today.

== Local biology ==
Hieracium naviense is a species of hawkweed whose only world location is found at Winnats Pass. It is a native perennial plant, first discovered growing on limestone outcrops in 1966. According to The Flora of Derbyshire, it has been refound there on a number of occasions since.

== Local history ==
A local legend is that the pass is haunted by a young couple Alan and Clara who eloped in 1758, only to be robbed and murdered by miners as they headed through Winnats Pass, on their way to Peak Forest Chapel. The miners hid their bodies in a mine shaft where they were discovered 10 years later.
