= Sheffield & Rotherham Wildlife Trust =

British conservation organisation

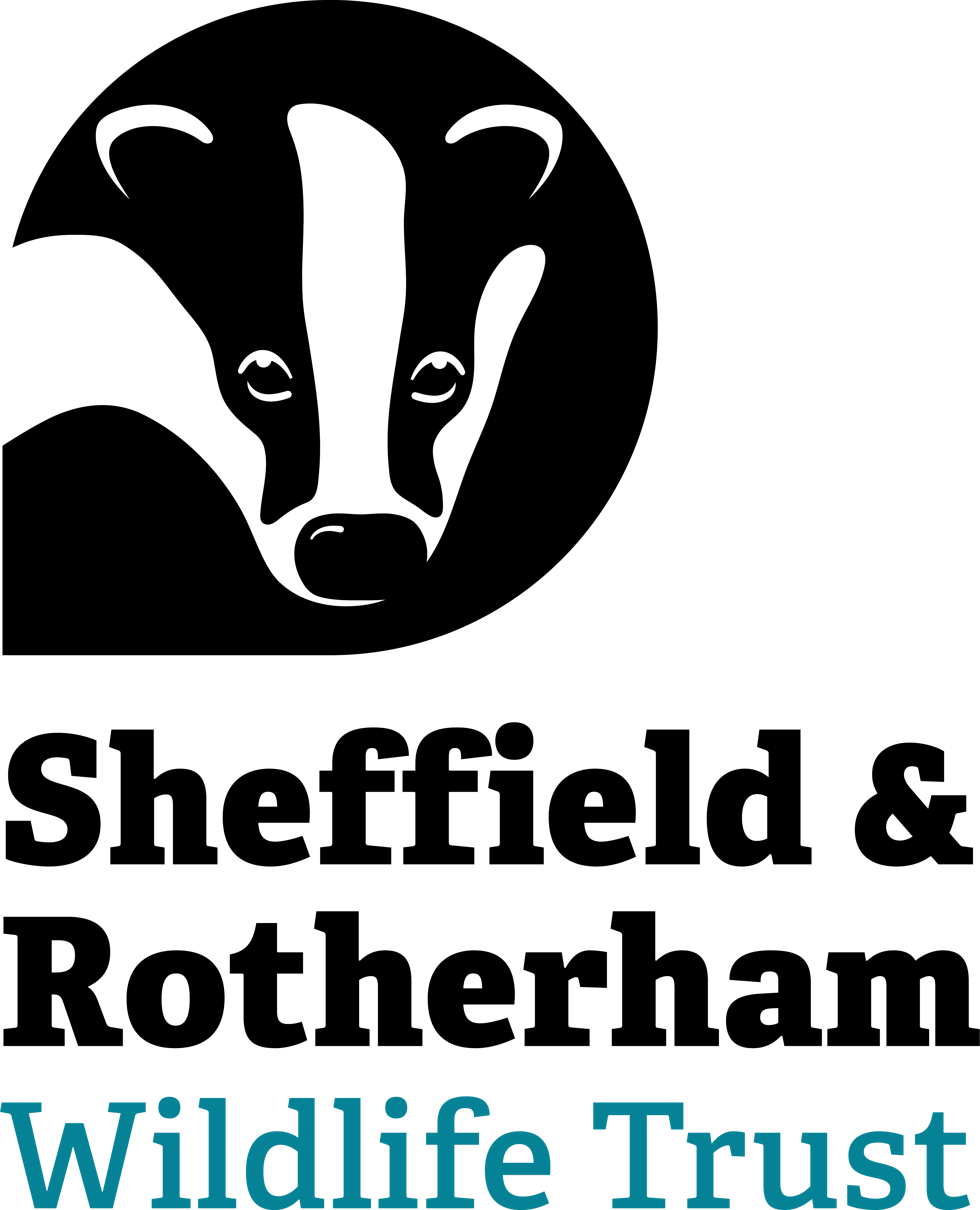
- Logo of the Trust
- Formation: 1 April 1985; 41 years ago
- Type: Registered charity
- Registration no.: Charity No. 700638; Company No. 2287928
- Legal status: Charitable company limited by guarantee
- Purpose: Nature conservation
- Headquarters: Sheffield, South Yorkshire, England
- Region served: Sheffield and Rotherham
- Chief Executive: Liz Ballard (2012–2025)
- Board of directors: Chair: Ben Stone
- Affiliations: The Wildlife Trusts
- Staff: ~50
- Volunteers: Hundreds
- Website: www.wildsheffield.com
- Remarks: Operates Wildscapes CIC, an environmental consultancy.

Sheffield & Rotherham Wildlife Trust is a registered charity and conservation organisation working across Sheffield and Rotherham in South Yorkshire, England. Founded in 1985, the Trust manages nature reserves, campaigns for wildlife protection, and engages communities in environmental education and action. It is part of the federation of 46 Wildlife Trusts across the UK but operates independently as a local charity under the legal name Sheffield Wildlife Trust.

== History ==
The Trust originated as the Sheffield City Wildlife Group in April 1985, formed by volunteers seeking to protect a patch of green space off Ecclesall Road, which became the Sunnybank Nature Reserve. It formally registered as a charity (No. 700638) in April 1988 and became affiliated with the Royal Society of Wildlife Trusts in 1991. Under CEO Rob Stoneman in the late 1990s, the Trust expanded significantly through urban regeneration funding, leasing 11 reserves and securing a £1 million Heritage Lottery grant by 1998.

Following a public rebrand to Sheffield & Rotherham Wildlife Trust, the charity broadened its remit to include sites across both districts. Key milestones include acquiring Greno Woods in 2012 and Ughill Farm in 2024, as well as a successful campaign to save ancient Smithy Wood from development. In 2025, the Trust celebrated its 40th anniversary.

== Mission and activities ==
The Trust's mission is to protect and enhance local wildlife and wild places for the benefit of nature and people. It manages over 600 hectares of habitat across 15 nature reserves and one conservation farm. Activities include land management, community outreach, advocacy, ecological consultancy (via its Wildscapes CIC), education, and citizen science.

The Trust is a leading voice in local environmental campaigns, such as flood management, climate adaptation, and biodiversity recovery. It participates in initiatives including the Sheffield Lakeland Partnership, Sheffield Street Tree Partnership, Sheffield Swift Network, and the South Yorkshire Local Nature Partnership.

== Nature Reserves and Sites ==
Designation key:

- SSSI – Site of Special Scientific Interest (SSSI)
- LNR – Local Nature Reserve (LNR)
- LWS – Local Wildlife Site (LWS)

=== 1. Nature Reserves in Sheffield ===
Photo	Name	Size	Habitat	Designation	Description
Footpath across moorland at Blacka Moor nature reserve	Blacka Moor	181 ha	Heathland, woodland	SSSI	Largest reserve with red deer, upland birds, and ancient woodland.
	Carbrook Ravine	5 ha	Woodland, stream	LNR	Urban wildlife corridor with young woodland and stream habitat.
Orchids growing in Carr House Meadows	Carr House Meadows	~4 ha	Hay meadows, pasture	LWS	Traditionally managed for wildflowers and pollinators.
Path and pond at Crabtree Ponds reserve	Crabtree Ponds	2 ha	Pond, reedbed	LNR	Urban pond reserve supporting amphibians and dragonflies.
Wooded path at entrance to Fox Hagg	Fox Hagg	3.7 ha	Heathland	LWS	Upland heath on edge of Wyming Brook.
Woodland path through Greno Woods	Greno Woods	169 ha	Ancient woodland	LWS	Diverse woodland with recreation trails and wildlife habitats.
Leafy woodland trail in Moss Valley Woodlands	Moss Valley Woodlands	26 ha	Ancient woodland	LWS	Bluebell woodlands along Moss Brook valley.
	Salmon Pastures	1.2 ha	Grassland, scrub	LWS	Industrial riverbank rewilded for wildflowers and birds.
	Sunnybank	1 ha	Wildflower meadow, pond	LNR	First Trust site; community garden and urban greenspace.
Small waterfall in Wyming Brook nature reserve	Wyming Brook	54 ha	Woodland, stream	LWS	Steep brook valley with woodland and scenic cascades.

=== 2. Nature Reserves in Rotherham ===
Photo	Name	Size	Habitat	Designation	Description
	Woodhouse Washlands	53 ha	Wet grassland, woodland	LWS	Floodplain reserve with seasonal wetland bird habitat.
Floodplain wetland and sculpture at Centenary Riverside	Centenary Riverside	4.5 ha	Floodplain wetland	LNR	Former steelworks turned flood storage and sculpture park.
	Kilnhurst Ings	25 ha	Oxbow lakes, meadows	LWS	Wetland area important for breeding and wintering birds.

=== 3. Special Conservation Spaces ===
Photo	Name	Size	Habitat	Designation	Description
	Agden Bog	~2 ha	Upland valley bog	LWS	Rare bog habitat with sphagnum moss and wetland flora.
	Hammond's Field	8 ha	Upland grassland	LWS	Unimproved grassland supporting orchids and ground-nesting birds.

=== 4. Nature-Friendly Farming ===
Photo	Name	Size	Habitat	Designation	Description
View of Ughill Farm with surrounding hills and fields	Ughill Farm	125 ha	Upland farmland, moorland fringe	SSSI (part)	Nature-friendly working farm supporting curlew, lapwing, and conservation grazing.

The Trust formerly managed Blackburn Meadows, a wetland site in the Lower Don Valley, but ceased direct management in 2019. The site is owned by Sheffield City Council, and the Trust continues to provide input on its long-term ecological management.

== Education and Outreach ==
The Trust runs events, training, and education programmes including Wild at Heart for wellbeing and Nature Tots for early years. It supports schools, green prescribing, and community projects such as Natural Neighbours and Wild Work Days. Over 5,000 members and hundreds of volunteers contribute to its work.

== Governance ==
The Trust publishes a full list of trustees and its Patron on its official website. Notable patrons have included Mike Dilger, naturalist and television presenter. The Trust is governed by a board of trustees and led by a Chief Executive. As of 2025, the Chair is Ben Stone and the outgoing CEO is Liz Ballard (2012–2025). It is a registered charity and company limited by guarantee. In 2024, it became one of the first Wildlife Trusts to formally recognise a staff union (IWGB). The recognition followed a period of internal staff campaigning and public comment, including media coverage of disagreements between staff and leadership.

== Wildscapes CIC ==
Wildscapes CIC is a wholly owned community interest company established by the Trust in 2007 to deliver environmental consultancy and land management services. Profits from Wildscapes are reinvested into the Trust’s charitable activities. The team provides services such as habitat surveys, biodiversity net gain planning, practical conservation works, and ecological advice to public bodies, developers, and other charities. Wildscapes contributes significantly to nature recovery in the region while supporting the Trust's financial sustainability.

== Partnerships ==
The Trust is affiliated with The Wildlife Trusts, contributing to national campaigns and biodiversity strategy. Locally, it hosts, runs or works with:

- Sheffield Swift Network – raising awareness and protection for swift nesting habitat in urban areas.
- The Sheffield Street Tree Partnership – promoting collaboration on sustainable urban tree management.
- South Yorkshire Woodland Partnership – supporting landscape-scale woodland creation and management.
- Sheffield Lakeland Partnership – landscape-scale habitat restoration and community engagement.
- Sheffield City Council and Rotherham MBC – co-managing sites and advising on planning.
- South Yorkshire Local Nature Partnership – coordinating recovery strategy and green networks.
- Peak District National Park Authority – joint moorland and species conservation.
- Universities of Sheffield and Sheffield Hallam – research, placements, and citizen science.
- NHS and mental health charities – delivering green prescribing and wellbeing programmes.
- Wildscapes CIC – Trust-owned consultancy delivering ecological services.
- Woodland Trust, RSPB, Yorkshire Water – collaborative projects on woodland, wetland and catchment management.

== Recognition ==
The Trust has won multiple awards including the Green Flag Award for Wyming Brook, Movement for Good funding, and a Healthcare Alliance Award for Wild at Heart. It has been featured in media including the BBC and Sheffield Tribune.

== See also ==
- The Wildlife Trusts
- Sheffield
- Rotherham
- Peak District National Park
- Wildlife of the United Kingdom
