= Longshaw Estate =

Area of the Peak District National Park, Derbyshire, England

Coordinates: 53.316°N 1.605°W

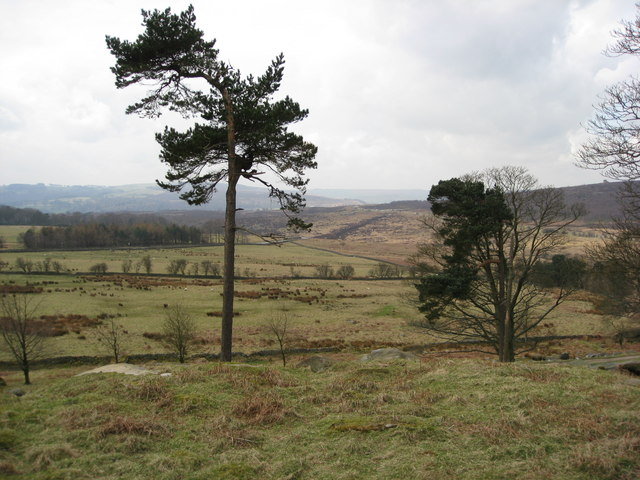
View from the A6187 road

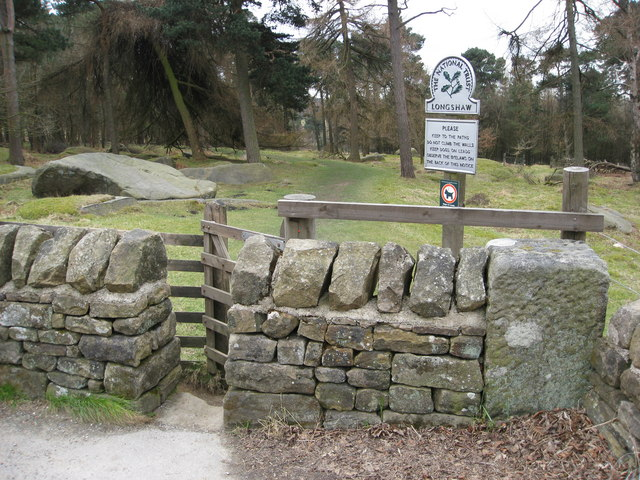
A gated entrance to the Longshaw Estate

The Longshaw Estate is an area of moorland, woodland and farmland within the Peak District National Park in Derbyshire, England.

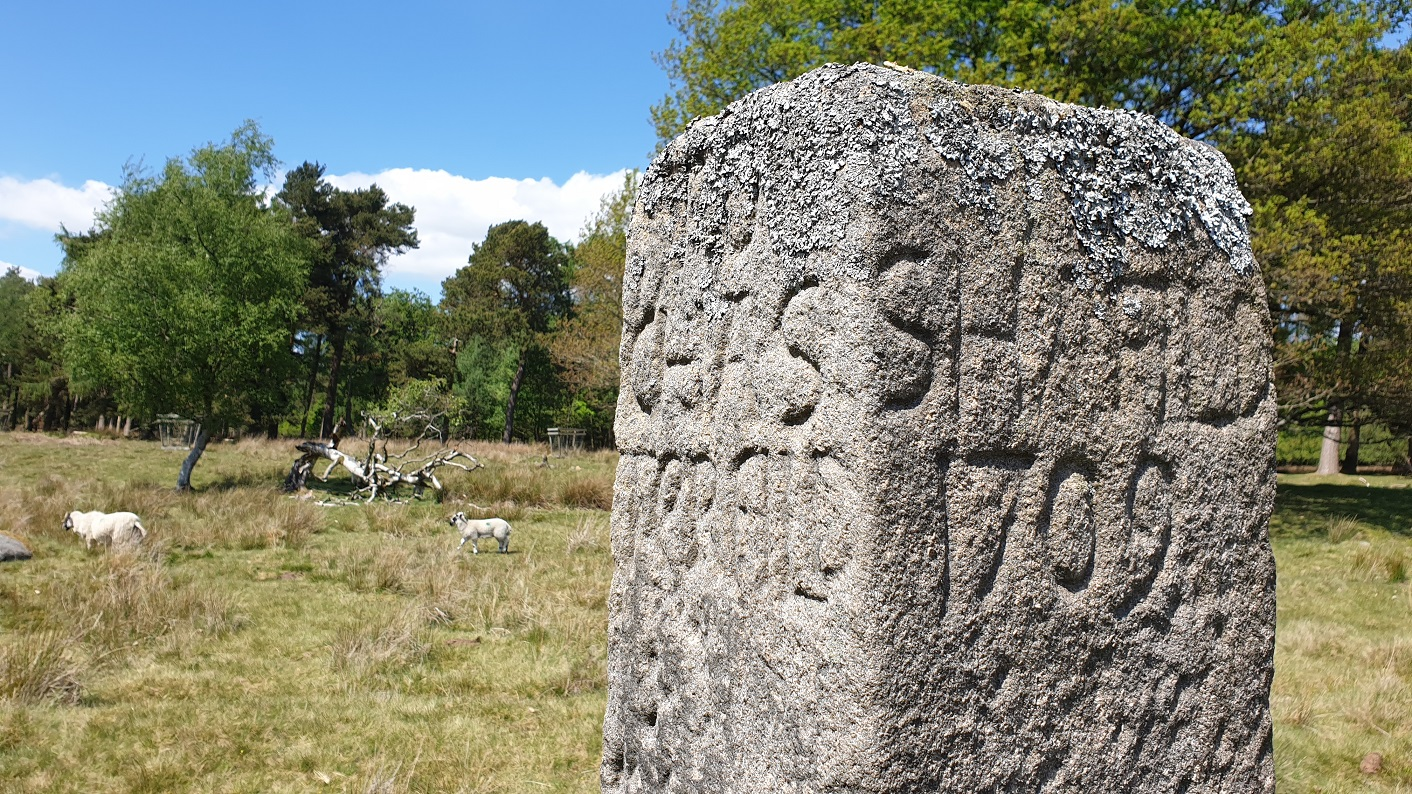
Stone guide post from 1709 with directions to Chesterfield and Sheffield

The name of Longshaw is thought to have derived from the long wood in Padley Gorge. There are remains from Bronze Age and medieval human settlement in the area. Millstones were made from the gritstone at Yarncliffe Quarry back to the 15th century. There are two guidestoops (stone guide posts) from the early 1700s on the estate, required by an Act of Parliament to help travellers across open moorland. The Duke of Rutland acquired the estate in 1855. He built Longshaw Lodge for shooting parties at the estate. The Longshaw Sheepdog Trials have been held since 1898 and are supposed to be the oldest to be run every year in England. The duke sold the estate in 1927 to Sheffield Corporation.

In 1928, Ethel Haythornthwaite spearheaded an urgent appeal to the Yorkshire public, which helped Peak District and South Yorkshire CPRE to raise the funds to buy the 747-acre (302 ha) Longshaw Estate, which was threatened with development. The estate was given to the National Trust in 1931.

The estate is part of the larger National Trust Peak District Estate and is run along with the High Peak Estate and White Peak Estate. At Longshaw, there is a tea room, shop and a learning facility called the Moorland Discovery Centre, which is a joint venture between the National Trust and the Peak National Park. Also staff and volunteers run many events throughout the year on the estate relating to wildlife, the estate itself and many other topics.

== See also ==
- Listed buildings in Grindleford
