= The Stones, Castleton =

Street in Castleton, Derbyshire, England

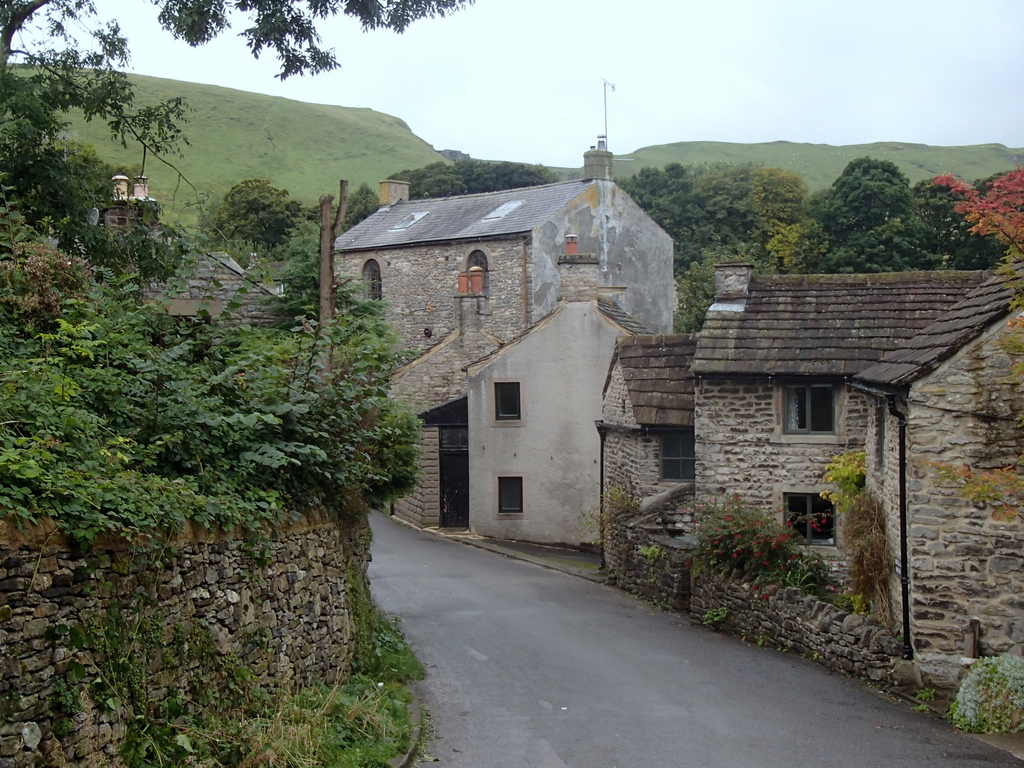
The Stones

The Stones is a short street in Castleton, Derbyshire. The street connects Market Place at the Castleton War Memorial, crossing the Peakhole Water before meeting Goosehill.

The street features a popular photography spot on the Goosehill bridge, looking towards the 17th-century residences. Peveril Castle overlooks the street.

== History ==
The road is referred to in 1761 church records from St Edmund's Church, where its original name, Slippery Stones, is used for a baptism record for George, son of John Hall, Slippery Stones. The Hall family historically lived at the nearby Castleton Hall.
