= List of botanical gardens in Jamaica =

Botanical gardens in Jamaica have collections consisting entirely of Jamaica native and endemic species; most have a collection that include plants from around the world. There are botanical gardens and arboreta in all states and territories of Jamaica, most are administered by local governments, some are privately owned.

- Bath Botanical Gardens
- Castleton Botanical Garden
- Cinchona Botanical Gardens
- Hope Botanical Gardens
- National Heroes Park
