= Castleton Medieval Hospital =

Scheduled monument in Derbyshire, England

- Interactive map of Castleton Medieval Hospital
- 53°20′47″N 1°45′59″W
- Periods: late Middle Ages
- Location: Castleton
- Region: Derbyshire, England

Scheduled monument
- Official name: Medieval hospital 530m south east of Losehill Hall
- Designated: 15 February 1999
- Reference no.: 1018869

The Castleton Medieval Hospital in Castleton, Derbyshire, consist of earthworks and buried remains of Castleton medieval hospital.

The hospital remains were classified as a scheduled monument on 15 February 1999.

== See also ==
- Scheduled monuments in High Peak
