= Castletown =

Castletown may refer to:

- Castle town, a settlement built adjacent to or surrounding a castle

== Places ==
=== Australia ===
- Castletown, Western Australia, a suburb of the remote town of Esperance

=== Republic of Ireland ===
- Castletownroche, County Cork, a village
- Castletown, County Cork (disambiguation), several townlands and villages
- Castletown, County Laois, a village
- Castletown, County Limerick, a townland and village
- Castletown House, County Kildare, a country house
- Castletownbere, County Cork
- Castletown-Geoghegan, County Westmeath
- Castletown, County Wexford
- Castletown Kilpatrick, County Meath

=== Isle of Man ===
- Castletown, Isle of Man

=== United Kingdom ===
- Castletown, Cheshire
- Castletown, Dorset
- Castletown, Highland, Scotland
- Castletown, Penrith, Cumbria
- Castletown, County Antrim, a townland in Islandmagee, County Antrim, Northern Ireland
- Castletown, County Tyrone, a townland in Carnteel parish, County Tyrone, Northern Ireland
- Castletown, Sunderland
- RAF Castletown, Scotland

== Other uses ==
- Castletown (horse), a New Zealand Thoroughbred racehorse
- Castletown, County Mayo, the fictional setting of the mockumentary Hardy Bucks

== See also ==
- Castleton (disambiguation)
