= Goosehill =

Goosehill may refer to the following places:

- Goosehill Hall, Castleton, Derbyshire
- Goosehill Camp, West Sussex
