= Cryer House =

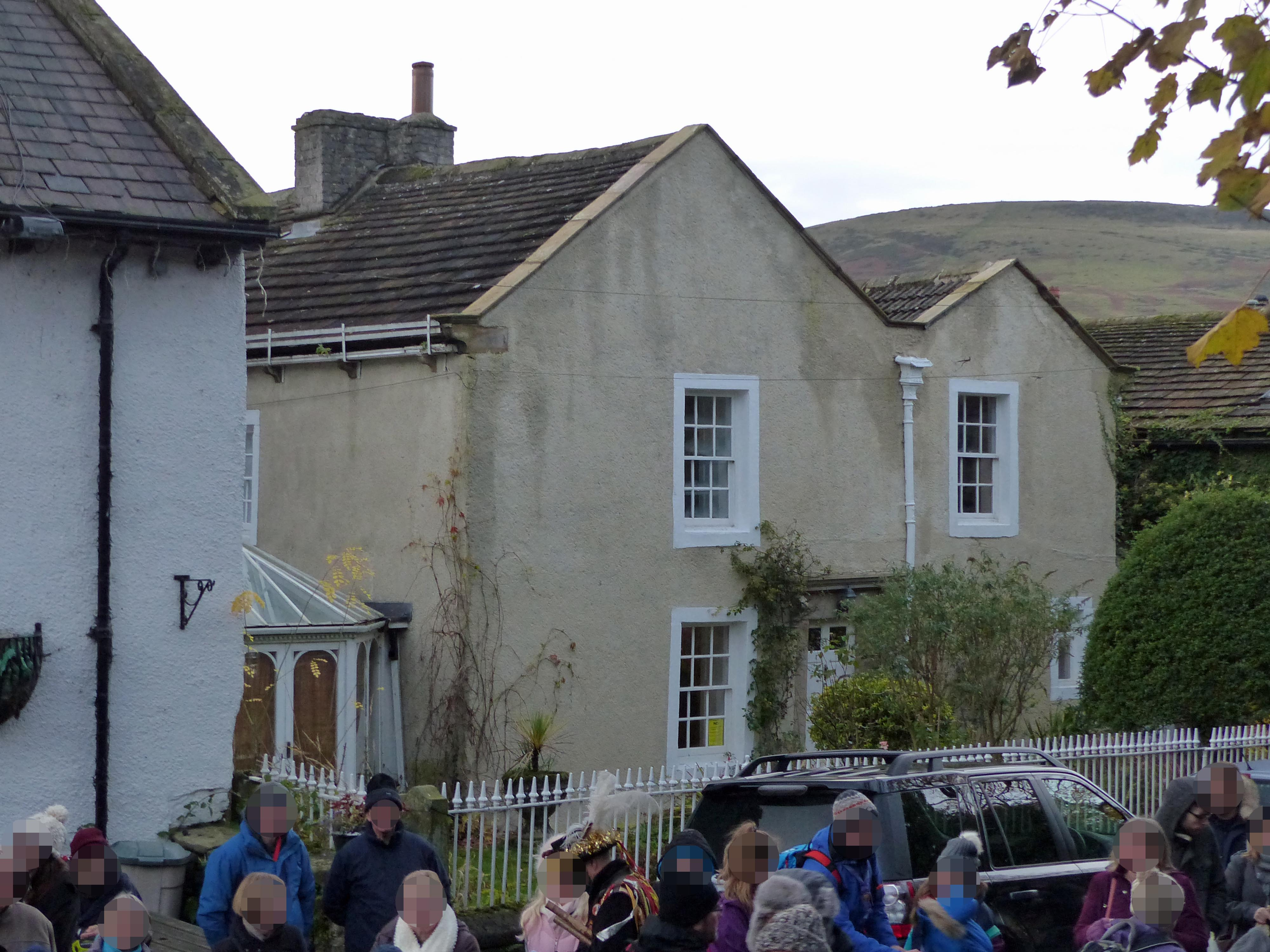
- Cryer House

- Location in Derbyshire
- 53°20′34″N 1°46′36″W
- Location: Castleton, Derbyshire, England

Listed Building – Grade II
- Official name: Cryer House
- Designated: 24 September 1984
- Reference no.: 1096605

Cryer House is a 17th-century grade II listed country hall on Castle Street in Castleton, Derbyshire.

== History ==
A smaller dwelling named Billson House stood on the site of Cryer House. Cryer House was named after Rev. Samuel Cryer, a local vicar during Cromwell's Protectorate. In 1702, the house was purchased by the Ashton family. Robert How Ashton lived at the house during the 19th Century, and his son of the same name inherited the house. It became part of the Losehill Estate following Ashton's relocation to the newly built Losehill Hall. The house left the estate following a sale in 1925, and in later years, it has been operated as a B&B.

== See also ==
- Listed buildings in Castleton, Derbyshire
