= Castleton =

Castleton may refer to:

== Places ==
=== Canada ===
- Castleton, Ontario

=== Jamaica ===
- Castleton Gardens, a botanical garden near Kingston

=== United Kingdom ===
==== England ====
- Castleton, Derbyshire
- Castleton, Dorset
- Castleton, Greater Manchester
- Castleton, North Yorkshire

==== Scotland ====
- Castleton, Scottish Borders (Roxburghshire)
- Castleton, Angus, a village

==== Wales ====
- Castleton, Newport

=== United States ===
- Castleton, Indiana, a neighborhood (formerly a separate small town) in Indianapolis
  - Castleton Square, a large mall in Castleton, Indiana
- Castleton, Kansas
- Castleton, Maryland
- Castleton Township, Michigan
- Castleton, Staten Island, in New York City
- Castleton-on-Hudson, New York, in Rensselaer County
- Castleton, Utah, a ghost town
  - Castleton Tower, Moab, Utah
- Castleton, Vermont
  - Castleton (village), Vermont, in the town of Castleton
  - Castleton University
- Castleton, Virginia

== Surname ==
- Roy Castleton
- Gavin Castleton
- Colin Castleton
- Castleton baronets, a title in the Baronetage of England

== Other ==
- Castleton station (disambiguation), stations of the name
- Castleton China, a line of fine china and tableware produced by Shenango China, based in New Castle, Pennsylvania

== See also ==
- Castle town
