= Castle Hotel, Castleton =

Castle Hotel
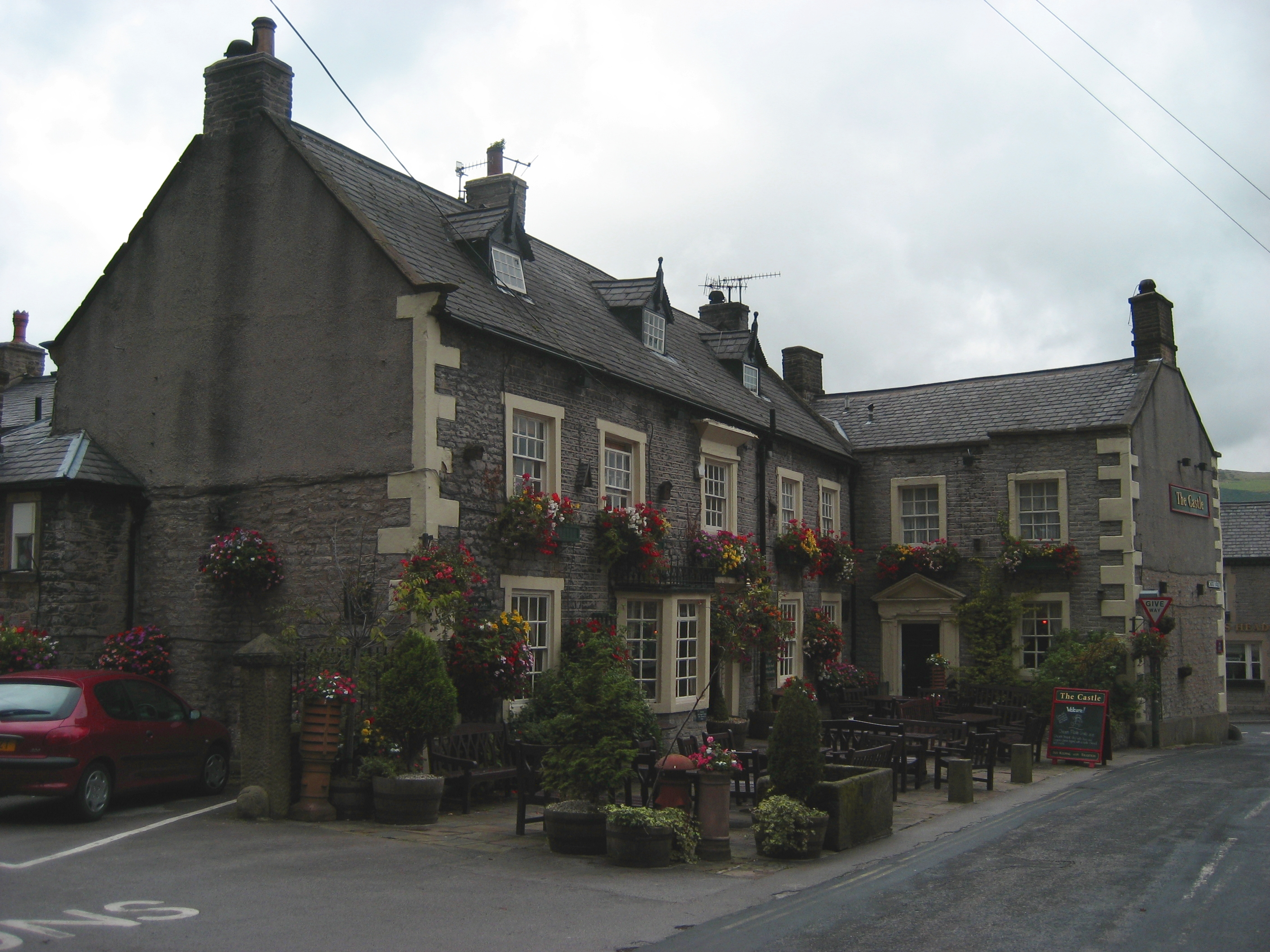
- Castle Hotel

- Location in Derbyshire
- 53°20′35″N 1°46′34″W
- Location: Castleton, Derbyshire, England

Listed Building – Grade II
- Official name: Castle Hotel
- Designated: 25 October 1951
- Reference no.: 1096604

Castle Hotel is an 18th-century grade II listed Inn on Castle Street in Castleton, Derbyshire.

== History ==
The Castle Hotel dates to the early 18th-century, with the inn being situated on the Wellington Express coach route between Manchester and Sheffield.

== See also ==
- Listed buildings in Castleton, Derbyshire
