= Castletown, County Cork =

Castletown is the name of several places in County Cork in Ireland, including:

- Castletown Berehaven (or Castletown-Bearhaven), a port town in West Cork also known as Castletownbere.
- Castletown-Kinneigh, or Baile Chaisleáin Chinn Eich, a small village in the townland of Castletown in the civil parish of Kinneigh in inland South West Cork
- Castletown, Castletownroche, a townland in the civil parish of Castletownroche in inland North Cork
- Castletown, Kinure, a townland in the civil parish of Kinure, near Oysterhaven on the southern coast of Cork
- Castletown, Mogeely, a townland in the civil parish of Mogeely in inland East Cork
- Castletownshend, a small fishing village south of Skibbereen

== See also ==
- Castletown (disambiguation)
