= Toll Bar Cottage =

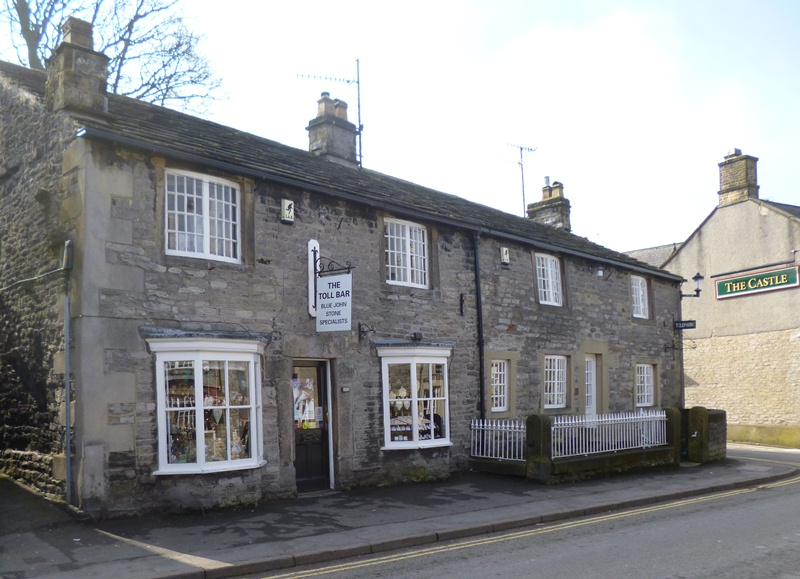
- Toll Bar Cottage

- Location in Derbyshire
- 53°20′35″N 1°46′34″W
- Location: Castleton, Derbyshire, England

Listed Building – Grade II
- Official name: Toll Bar Cottage and shop and attached wall and railings
- Designated: 24 September 1984
- Reference no.: 1334532

Toll Bar Cottage is a 17th-century grade II listed cottage on Cross Street in Castleton, Derbyshire.

== History ==
The Toll Bar was used as a tollhouse on the Chapel-en-le-Frith to Sheffield turnpike c. 1810. Today the building houses a gift shop, selling the local Blue John crystal.

The building, including the attached railings, has been Grade II listed since 24 September 1984.

== See also ==
- Listed buildings in Castleton, Derbyshire
