= Isaac Ambrose =

English Puritan clergy

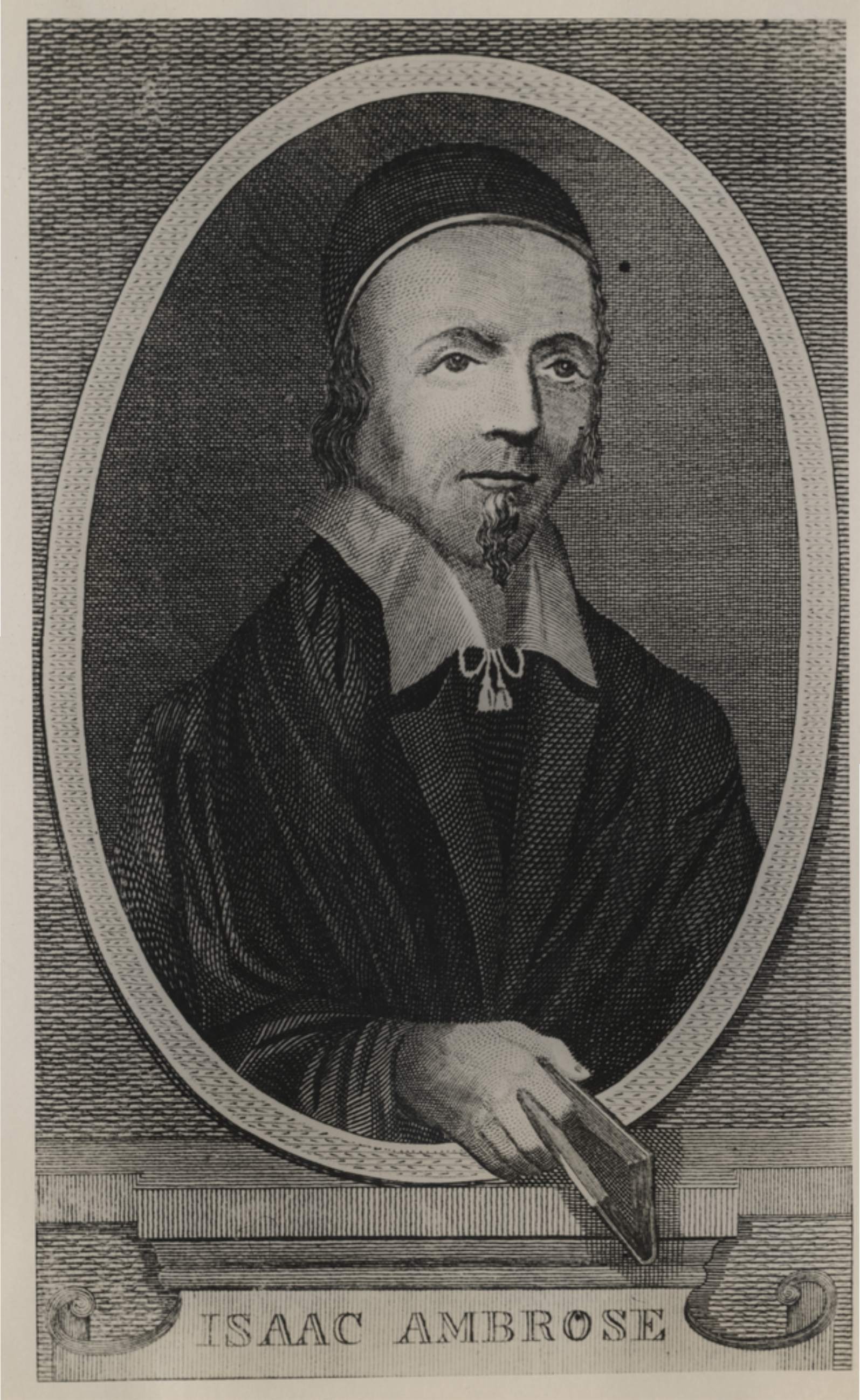
Isaac Ambrose.

Isaac Ambrose (1604 – 20 January 1664) was an English Puritan divine. He graduated with a BA from Brasenose College, Oxford, on 1624. He obtained the curacy of St Edmund’s Church, Castleton, Derbyshire, in 1627. He was one of king's four preachers in Lancashire in 1631. He was twice imprisoned by commissioners of array. He worked for the establishment of Presbyterianism; successively at Leeds, Preston, and Garstang, whence he was ejected for nonconformity in 1662. He also published religious works.

== Biography ==
Ambrose was born in 1604. He was the son of Richard Ambrose, vicar of Ormskirk, and was probably descended from the Ambroses of Lowick in Furness, a well-known Roman Catholic family. He entered Brasenose College, Oxford, in 1621, in his seventeenth year.

Having graduated B.A. in 1624 and been ordained, Ambroses received in 1627 the little cure of Castleton in Derbyshire. By the influence of William Russell, earl of Bedford, he was appointed one of the king's itinerant preachers in Lancashire, and after living for a time in Garstang, he was selected by the Lady Margaret Hoghton as vicar of Preston. He associated himself with Presbyterianism, and was on the celebrated committee for the ejection of "scandalous and ignorant ministers and schoolmasters" during the Commonwealth.

So long as Ambrose continued at Preston he was favoured with the warm friendship of the Hoghton family, their ancestral woods and the tower near Blackburn affording him sequestered places for those devout meditations and "experiences" that give such a charm to his diary, portions of which are quoted in his Prima Media & Ultima (1650, 1659). The immense auditory of his sermon (Redeeming the Time) at the funeral of Lady Hoghton was long a living tradition all over the county. On account of the feeling engendered by the civil war Ambrose left his great church of Preston in 1654, and became minister of Garstang, whence, however, in 1662 he was ejected along two thousand ministers who refused to conform (see Great Ejection). His after years were passed among old friends and in quiet meditation at Preston. He died of apoplexy about 20 January 1664.

== Character assessment ==
As a religious writer Ambrose has a vividness and freshness of imagination possessed by scarcely any of the Puritan Nonconformists. Many who have no love for Puritan doctrine, nor sympathy with Puritan experience, have appreciated the pathos and beauty of his writings, and his Looking unto Jesus long held its own in popular appreciation with the writings of John Bunyan.

Dr Edmund Calamy the Elder (1600–1666) wrote about him:

Ambrose was a man of that substantial worth, that eminent piety, and that exemplary life, both as a minister and a Christian, that it is to be lamented the world should not have the benefit of particular memoirs of him.

In the opinion of John Eglington Bailey (his biographer in the DNB), his character has been misrepresented by Wood. He was of a peaceful disposition; and though he put his name to the fierce "Harmonious Consent", he was not naturally a partisan. He evaded the political controversies of the time. His gentleness of character and earnest presentation of the gospel attached him to his people. He was much given to secluding himself, retiring every May into the woods of Hoghton Tower and remaining there a month.

Bailey continues that Dr. Halley justly characterises him as the most meditative puritan of Lancashire. This quality pervades his writings, which abound, besides, in deep feeling and earnest piety. Mr. Hunter has called attention to his recommendation of diaries as a means of advancing personal piety, and has remarked, in reference to the fragments from Ambrose's diary quoted in the "Media", that "with such passages before us we cannot but lament that the carelessness of later times should have suffered such a curious and valuable document to perish; for perished it is to be feared it has".

== Works ==
- Looking unto Jesus: A View of the Everlasting Gospel; Or, The Soul's Eying of Jesus as Carrying on the Great Work of Man's Salvation, from First to Last
- The Christian Warrior: Wrestling with Sin, Satan, The World and the Flesh
- The well-ordered family : wherein the duties of it's various members are described and urged. A small, but very comprehensive piece, suitable to be in the hand of every housholder; and may be especially seasonable in the present day
- Prima, media et ultima, or, The First, Middle and Last Things
