= Samuel Bagshawe =

English soldier and politician (1713–1762)

- Born: May 1713; Derbyshire, England
- Died: 16 August 1762; Reading, Berkshire, England
- Resting place: Chapel-en-le-Frith
- Occupations: soldier, politician
- Known for: Member of parliament for Tallow (1761–62); Deputy Lieutenant of Derbyshire
- Spouse: Catherine Caldwell
- Children: William Bagshawe (1752–55); Samuel Bagshawe (1753–1804); John Bagshawe (1758–1801); Anne Bagshawe (1760–1811); Richard Bagshawe (1761–64); Rev. William Bagshawe (1763–1847)
- Parents: Samuel Bagshawe; Frances Hardwarr
- Relatives: William Bagshaw (great-grandfather)

Samuel Bagshawe (1713 – 16 August 1762) was an English soldier and politician, originally from Chapel-en-le-Frith in Derbyshire, England. He served in Gibraltar, Ireland, and India.

== Early life ==
Bagshawe was the son of Samuel Bagshawe and Frances Hardwar(r), daughter of John Hardwar of Bromborough Court. The prominent Derbyshire Bagshawe family originated in the hamlet of Bagshaw, with their family seat being nearby Wormhill Hall in Chapel-en-le-Frith. The family later built Ford Hall, and also inherited a number of country halls including The Oakes at Norton, and Goosehill Hall at Castleton. Samuel's great-grandfather was nonconformist minister William Bagshaw.

Bagshawe was orphaned in 1719 when his mother died, his father having died during her pregnancy. He was raised by his uncle William Bagshawe at Ford Hall, and was educated at Knutsford and later Wakefield.

== Military ==
In 1731, he left his school in Wakefield to join the Regiment of Foot in Gibraltar. He appealed to his relatives to obtain his discharge in 1738, at which stage he was a Quartermaster Sergeant. He returned to military service in 1740, joining a regiment in Ireland as an officer; by 1760 he had achieved the rank of Colonel, and was pending promotion to Major-General by the time of his death.

In 1746 he was wounded at the Raid on Lorient, losing a leg, and was second in command of British Forces in India, where he suffered vision problems.

On 25 March 1751, he married Catherine Caldwell, daughter of Sir John Caldwell of Castle Caldwell.

In 1760, France threatened an invasion of Ireland. The Government accepted Bagshawe's request to raise a regiment at his expense (93rd Regiment of Foot). He later served as an MP for Tallow in 1761–62, and as Justice of the Peace and Deputy Lieutenant for Derbyshire. Bagshawe's

== Death ==
Bagshawe died at Reading on 16 August 1762; his body was later removed to his native Chapel-en-le-Frith.
