= Castleton station =

Castleton station or Castleton railway station may refer to:

- Castleton station (Vermont), an Amtrak station in Castleton, Vermont, U.S.A.
- Castleton railway station, a railway station in Castleton, Greater Manchester, England
- Castleton Moor railway station, a railway station in Castleton, North Yorkshire, England

== See also ==
- Castleton (disambiguation)
