= Listed buildings in Castleton, Derbyshire =

Castleton is a civil parish in the High Peak district of Derbyshire, England. The parish contains 25 listed buildings that are recorded in the National Heritage List for England. Of these, one is listed at Grade I, the highest of the three grades, one is at Grade II*, the middle grade, and the others are at Grade II, the lowest grade. The parish contains the village of Castleton and the surrounding countryside and moorland. The most important building in the parish is the ruined Peveril Castle, which is listed at Grade I. The other listed buildings include houses, cottages and associated structures, farmhouses and farm buildings, a church and a sundial in the churchyard, a hotel and a public house, a former watermill, three mileposts, a school, a war memorial, and a telephone kiosk.

== Key ==
Grade	Criteria
I	Buildings of exceptional interest, sometimes considered to be internationally important
II*	Particularly important buildings of more than special interest
II	Buildings of national importance and special interest

== Buildings ==
Name and location	Photograph	Date	Notes	Grade
Peveril Castle, walls and foundations 53.33997°N 1.77754°W		Late 11th century	The castle, which is in ruins, is in limestone and gritstone on a roughly triangular site, with the keep in the southwest angle. The keep, which was built in 1176, has a square plan, with buttresses, narrow round-headed windows in the bottom floor, larger windows above, and the remains of a spiral staircase. The other remains include the curtain walls, and parts of a hall, other domestic buildings, and a chapel.	I
St Edmund's Church; 53.34283°N 1.77582°W		Early 12th century	The church was extended and altered through the centuries, and most of it dates from a restoration in about 1837. The church is built in limestone and gritstone and has lead roofs, and consists of a nave, a south porch, a chancel with a north vestry and a west tower. The tower has three stages, diagonal buttresses, a three-light west window with a four-centred arch, lancet bell openings, and an embattled parapet with eight pinnacles. Along the body of the church is a moulded parapet with pinnacles, and the porch has an embattled gable with pinnacles.	II*
Cryer House; 53.34272°N 1.77661°W		17th century	The house is in rendered stone and has a stone slate roof with coped gables and moulded kneelers. There are two storeys, a double depth plan a south front of four bays, and two gables facing the road. On the front is a canted porch, and the windows are sashes.	II
Toll Bar Cottage and shop, wall and railings 53.34308°N 1.77610°W		17th century	A pair of cottages, later a cottage and a shop, in stone with gritstone dressings, quoins, and a stone slate roof. There are two storeys and five bays. The cottage, on the right has a central doorway and casement windows, and the doorway of the shop is flanked by canted bay windows. Inside there is a complete cruck truss and the remains of a second truss. The cottage has garden walls with iron railings.	II
Castle Hotel; 53.34300°N 1.77644°W		Early 18th century	The hotel is in gritstone, partly rendered, on a plinth, with quoins, and a slate roof with coped gables and moulded kneelers. There are two storeys and an L-shaped plan, with a range of five bays and a two-bay projecting wing. In the centre is a doorway, to its left is a canted bay window, and the windows are sashes, the window above the doorway with a projecting hood mould. In the roof are three gabled dormers. The wing contains a doorway with pilasters and a pediment, and at the top is a small parapet.	II
Castleton Hall; 53.34212°N 1.77659°W		Early 18th century	A house later divided, it is in limestone with rendered dressings, quoins, a floor band, a coved cornice, a parapet, and a roof mainly in Welsh slate. There are two storeys and an L-shaped plan, consisting of a main range with seven bays divided by pilasters, and a double-depth plan, and a projecting gabled wing. There are Baroque features on the front, and a central doorway with a massive surround and a fanlight. The windows are casements, those in the ground floor with keystones and pediments, and those in the upper floor with aprons and triple keystones.	II
Castle Close Cottage; 53.34185°N 1.77679°W		18th century and earlier	The cottage is in rubble stone with gritstone dressings and a roof of Welsh slate and stone slate. There are two storeys and three bays. The central doorway is flanked by two-light mullioned windows, and inside there are two pairs of raised crucks.	II
Barn, Goosehill Hall; 53.34127°N 1.78114°W		18th century	The barn is in limestone with gritstone dressings, quoins, and a stone slate roof with chamfered coped gables and moulded kneelers. There is a single storey and attics, and an L-shaped plan. The openings include doorways, windows and garage doors.	II
Gate piers, Goosehill Hall; 53.34269°N 1.78070°W		18th century	The gate piers at the entrance to the drive are in gritstone. They are square and rusticated, and each pier has a moulded cap and a ball finial.	II
Sundial; 53.34264°N 1.77568°W		18th century	The sundial is in the churchyard of St Edmund's Church. It is in gritstone, and consists of an octagonal column on a square base and three circular steps. The sundial has a moulded capital with a brass plate and gnomon.	II
Goosehill Hall; 53.34116°N 1.78036°W		Late 18th century	A house in limestone with gritstone dressings, quoins, and a stone slate roof with coped gables and moulded kneelers. There are two storeys and a basement, and an L-shaped plan, consisting of a five-bay range and a three-bay west wing. Semicircular steps lead to a doorway in the angle that has a moulded surround and a cornice. Some of the windows are sashes, and others are two-light mullioned windows.	II
Looe Cottage; 53.34394°N 1.77343°W		Late 18th century	The cottage is in limestone with gritstone dressings, quoins, and stone slate roof. There are two storeys and two bays. In the centre is a doorway with a stone surround, and the windows are mullioned.	II
Spital Buildings; 53.34559°N 1.76882°W		Late 18th century	A watermill, later used as farm buildings, and partly derelict. The building is in sandstone with stone slate roofs, and consists of three ranges around a courtyard. The north and west ranges have a single storey. The east range has three storeys and nine bays, and is partly derelict and without a roof. It contains segmental-headed windows, and stable-type doors.	II
Bean Hill Farmhouse; 53.34192°N 1.77533°W		Early 19th century	The farmhouse is in limestone, partly rendered, with gritstone dressings and a Welsh slate roof. There are two storeys and three bays. In the centre is a doorway, and the windows are sashes.	II
Outbuildings west of Bean Hill Farmhouse; 53.34205°N 1.77542°W		Early 19th century (or earlier)	The outbuildings are in limestone with gritstone dressings, quoins, and Welsh slate roofs with a partly coped gable with moulded kneelers. There are two storeys and two blocks, the south block higher. The front facing Market Place contains doorways, casement windows, and a cart entry.	II
Former stables, Castleton Hall; 53.34212°N 1.77722°W		Early 19th century	The stables, which have been converted for residential use, are in limestone, mostly rendered, with gritstone dressings, and stone slate roofs with one coped gable and moulded kneelers, and two storeys. The south front contains two carriage arches with quoins and voussoirs, a doorway and square windows.	II
Milepost at OS127832; 53.34515°N 1.81213°W		Early 19th century	The milepost on the south side of Rushup Edge is in cast iron, and has a triangular plan and a curved upper part. It is inscribed with the distances to Chapel-en-le-Frith, Sheffield, Hathersage, and Castleton.	II
Milepost at 0S134837; 53.34962°N 1.79977°W		Early 19th century	The milepost on the south side of Rushup Edge is in cast iron, and has a triangular plan and a concave upper part. It is inscribed with the distances to Chapel-en-le-Frith, Sheffield, Hathersage, and Sparrowpit.	II
Milepost at 0S146828; 53.34250°N 1.78252°W		Early 19th century	The milepost on the south side of Buston Road (A6187 road) is in cast iron, and has a triangular plan and a concave upper part. It is inscribed with "CASTLETON" and the distances to Chapel-en-le-Frith, Sheffield, Hathersage, and Sparrowpit.	II
The George; 53.34253°N 1.77645°W		Early 19th century	The public house is in rendered limestone, with gritstone dressings, and a Welsh slate roof with coped gables. There are two storeys and three bays. The central doorway has a bracketed hood, and is flanked by two-light mullioned windows with sashes. In the upper floor are three sash windows.	II
School, walls and railings 53.34347°N 1.77505°W		1863	The school is in limestone with gritstone dressings, on a chamfered plinth, with quoins, a sill band, a chamfered eaves band, and a Welsh slate roof with moulded gable copings and plain kneelers. There is a single storey and six bays, and a central spirelet. Between the bays are buttresses, and the windows are mullioned with two pointed cusped lights. In each outer bay is a gabled porch with moulded copings, kneelers and finials, and doorways with chamfered surrounds, four-centred arched heads, and hood moulds. Attached to the front of the school is a low wall with chamfered copings and iron railings.	II
Losehill Hall; 53.35115°N 1.77096°W		1882	A large house in Tudor style that has been converted for other uses. It is in limestone with gritstone dressings, floor bands, and a Welsh slate roof with moulded gable copings, kneelers, and finials. There are two storeys and an asymmetrical plan. The single-storey porch is polygonal with a flat roof and an arcaded parapet, and the doorway has a moulded surround, a Tudor arched head, and a hood mould. Most of the windows are mullioned and transomed.	II
Stable block, Losehill Hall; 53.35152°N 1.77134°W		1882	The stable block, later converted for residential use, is in limestone with gritstone dressings, and a Welsh slate roof with moulded gable copings and plain kneelers. There are seven bays. The central bay is a two-storey tower with a hipped roof and an embattled parapet, containing a carriageway with a Gothic arch with arrow slits above. The outer bays have a single storey, and contain windows, some transomed, and dormers, some gabled, others modern.	II
War memorial 53.34191°N 1.77583°W		1919	The war memorial in Market Place is in gritstone, and consists of an ornately carved Latin cross on a square base. The carvings include Celtic interlace, and a depiction of Victory with a sword. On the memorials are plaques with inscriptions and the names of those lost in the two World Wars.	II
Telephone kiosk, Castle Street; 53.34304°N 1.77623°W		1935	The K6 type telephone kiosk in Castle Street was designed by Giles Gilbert Scott. Constructed in cast iron with a square plan and a dome, it has three unperforated crowns in the top panels.	II
