= St Edmund's Church, Castleton =

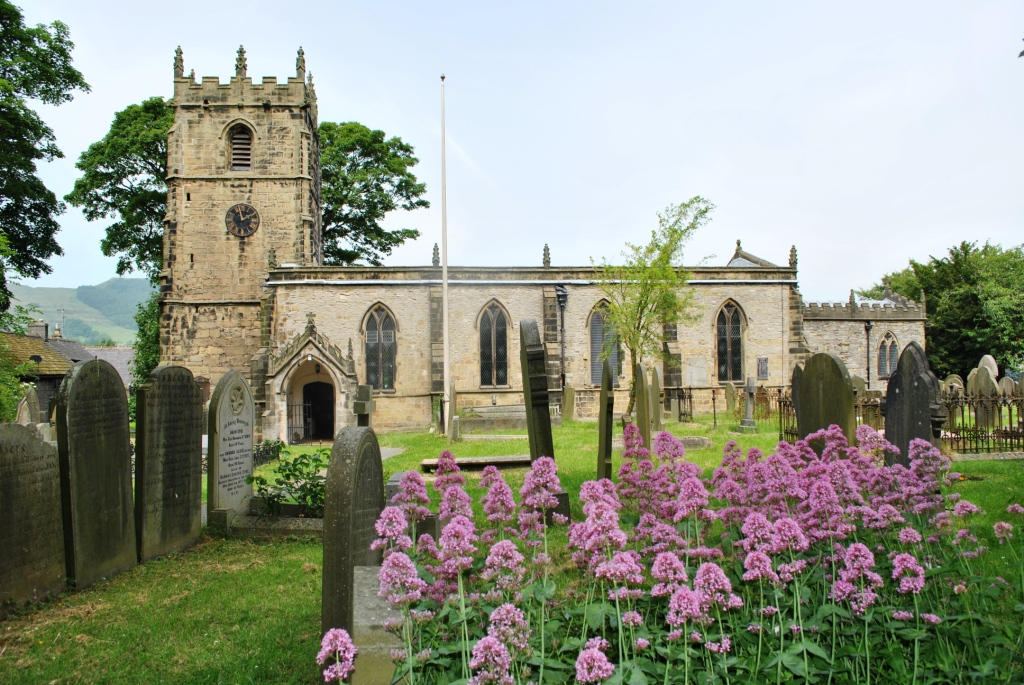
- St Edmund’s Church, Castleton
- St Edmund's Church, Castleton
- 53°20′34.07″N 1°46′32.69″W
- Location: Castleton, Derbyshire
- Country: England
- Denomination: Church of England

History
- Dedication: Edmund the Martyr

Architecture
- Heritage designation: Grade II* listed

Administration
- Diocese: Diocese of Derby
- Archdeaconry: Chesterfield
- Deanery: Bakewell and Eyam
- Parish: Castleton

St Edmund's Church, Castleton, is a Grade II* listed parish church in the Church of England in Castleton, Derbyshire.

== History ==
The church dates from the 12th century, and has some 14th-century elements. Alterations were carried out in 1831 when the south porch was built, and the aisles were demolished. A restoration was carried out in 1886 by Hill Brothers of Tideswell.

The tower of St. Edmund's contains a ring of eight bells, with the heaviest six cast in 1802, and two trebles cast in 1812. All bells were cast by James II Harrison, and are unusual for their light weight (11 hundredweight), while being in the key of E-flat. Modern, tuned bells in this key normally weigh in the region of 20 hundredweight.

== Vicars ==
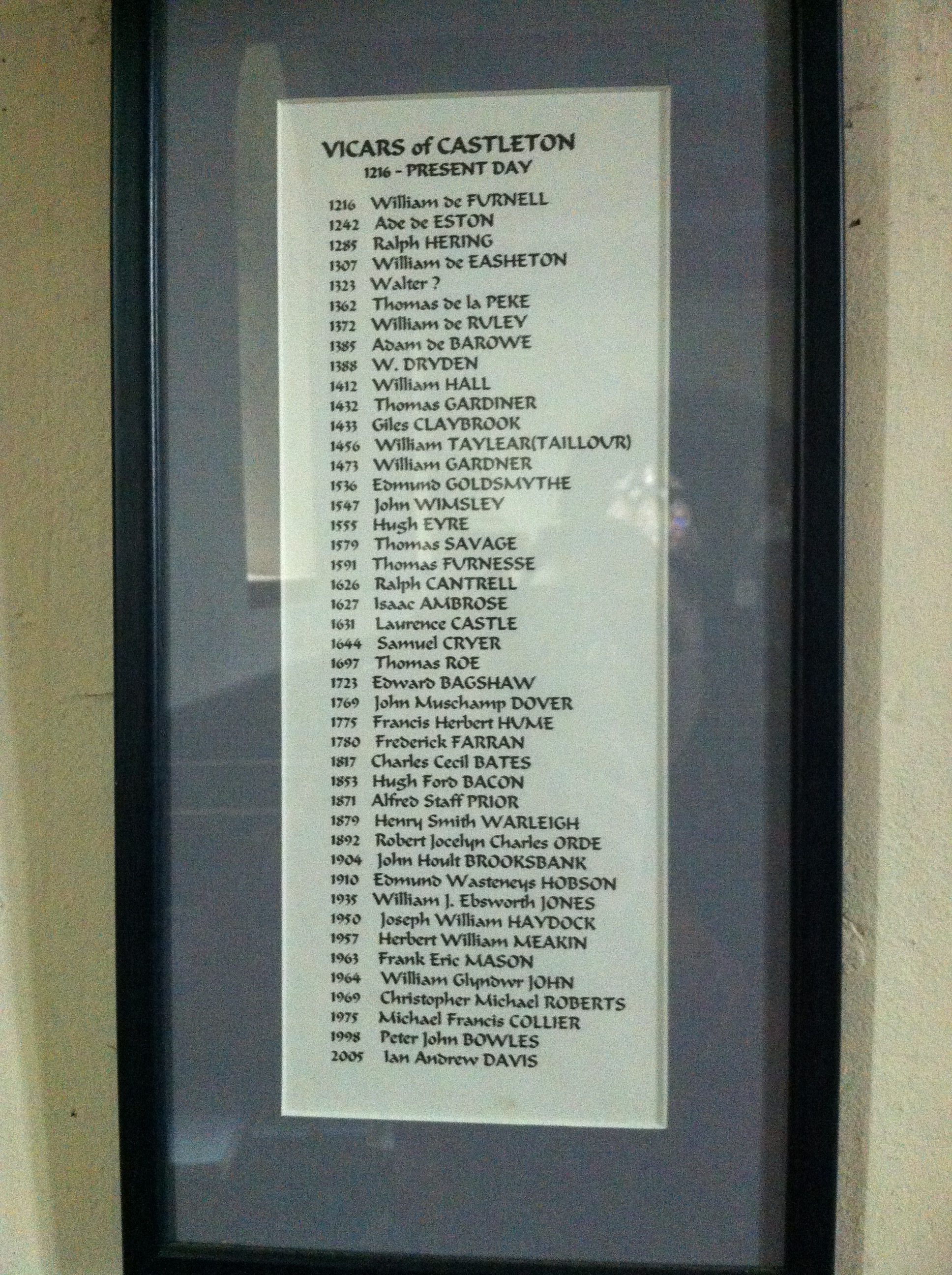
List of the vicars of Castleton

- 1216 William de Furnell
- 1242 Ade de Eston
- 1285 Ralph Hering
- 1307 William de Easheton
- 1323 Walter
- 1362 Thomas de la Peke
- 1372 William de Ruley
- 1385 Adam de Barowe
- 1388 W. Dryden
- 1412 William Hall
- 1432 Thomas Gardiner
- 1433 Giles Claybrook
- 1456 William Taylear
- 1473 William Gardner
- 1536 Edmund Goldsmythe
- 1547 John Wimsley
- 1555 Hugh Eyre
- 1579 Thomas Savage
- 1591 Thomas Furness
- 1626 Ralph Cantrell
- 1627 Isaac Ambrose
- 1631 Lawrence Castle
- 1644 Samuel Cryer
- 1697 Thomas Roe
- 1723 Edward Bagshaw
- 1769 John Mushchamp Dover
- 1775 Francis Herbert Hume
- 1780 Frederick Farran
- 1817 Charles Cecil Bates
- 1853 Hugh Ford Bacon
- 1871 Alfred Staff Prior
- 1879 Henry Smith Warleigh
- 1892 Robert Jocelyn Charles Orde
- 1904 John Hoult Brooksbank
- 1910 Edmund Wasteneys Hobson
- 1935 William J. Ebsworth Jones
- 1950 Joseph William Haydock
- 1957 Herbert William Meakin
- 1963 Frank Eric Mason
- 1964 William Glyndwr John
- 1969 Christopher Michael Roberts
- 1975 Michael Francis Collier
- 1998 Peter John Bowles
- 2005 Ian Andrew Davis

== Parish status ==
The church is in a joint parish with

- St Barnabas' Church, Bradwell
- St Peter's Church, Hope

== Organ ==
The church contains a pipe organ by Brindley and Foster. A specification of the organ can be found on the National Pipe Organ Register.

== Stained glass ==
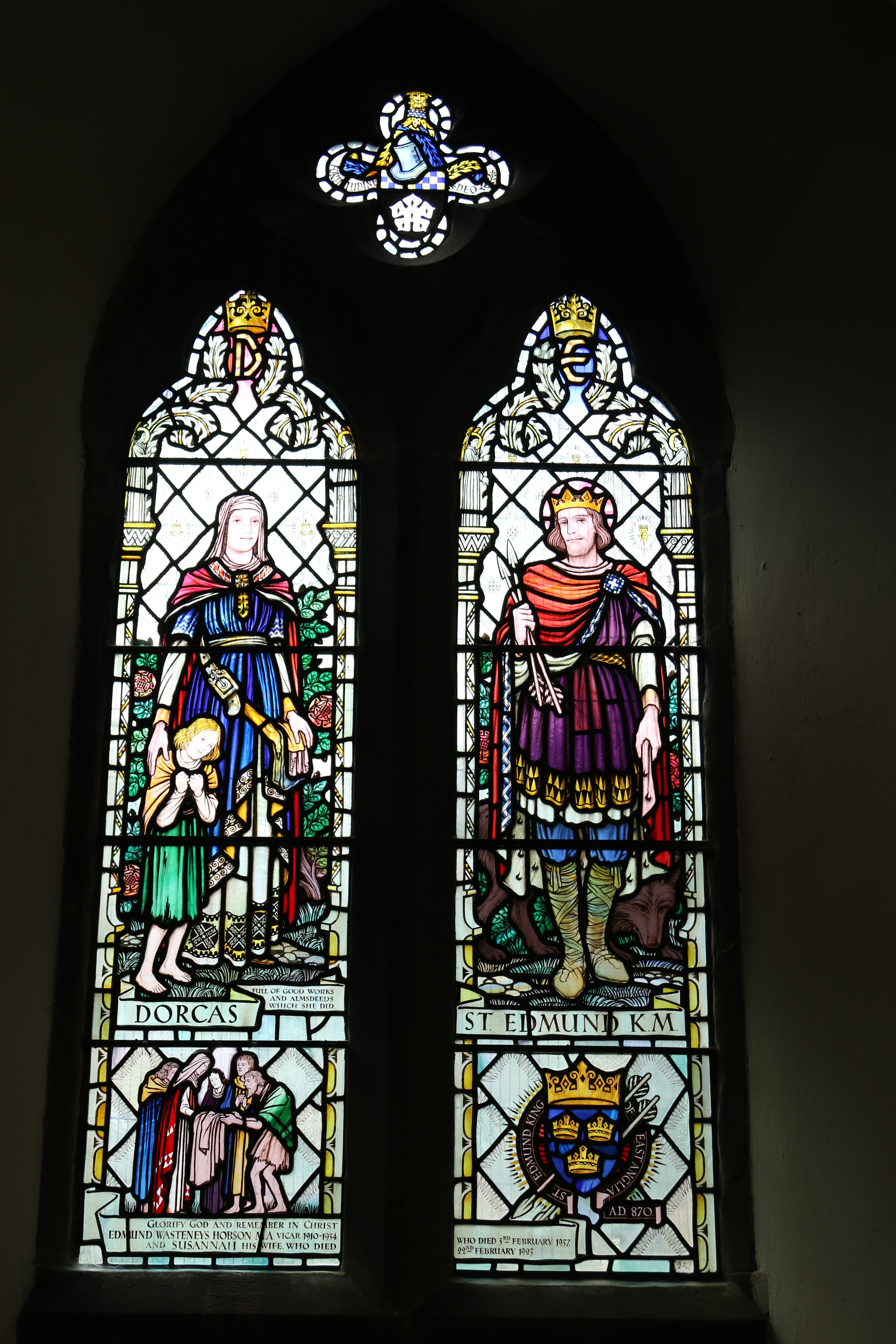
Dorcas and King Edmund by Hincks and Burnell 1937

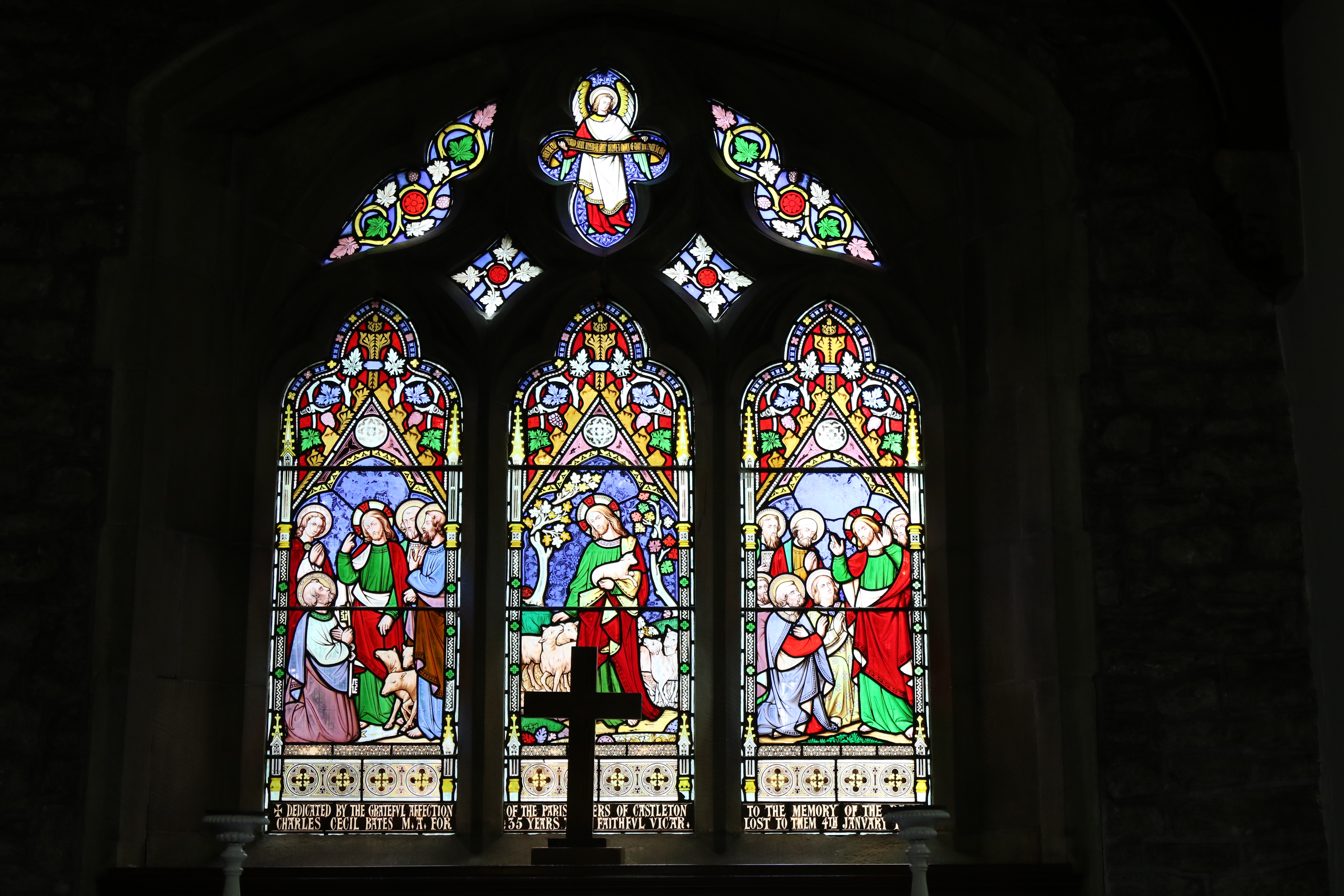
East window in memory of Charles Cecil Bates

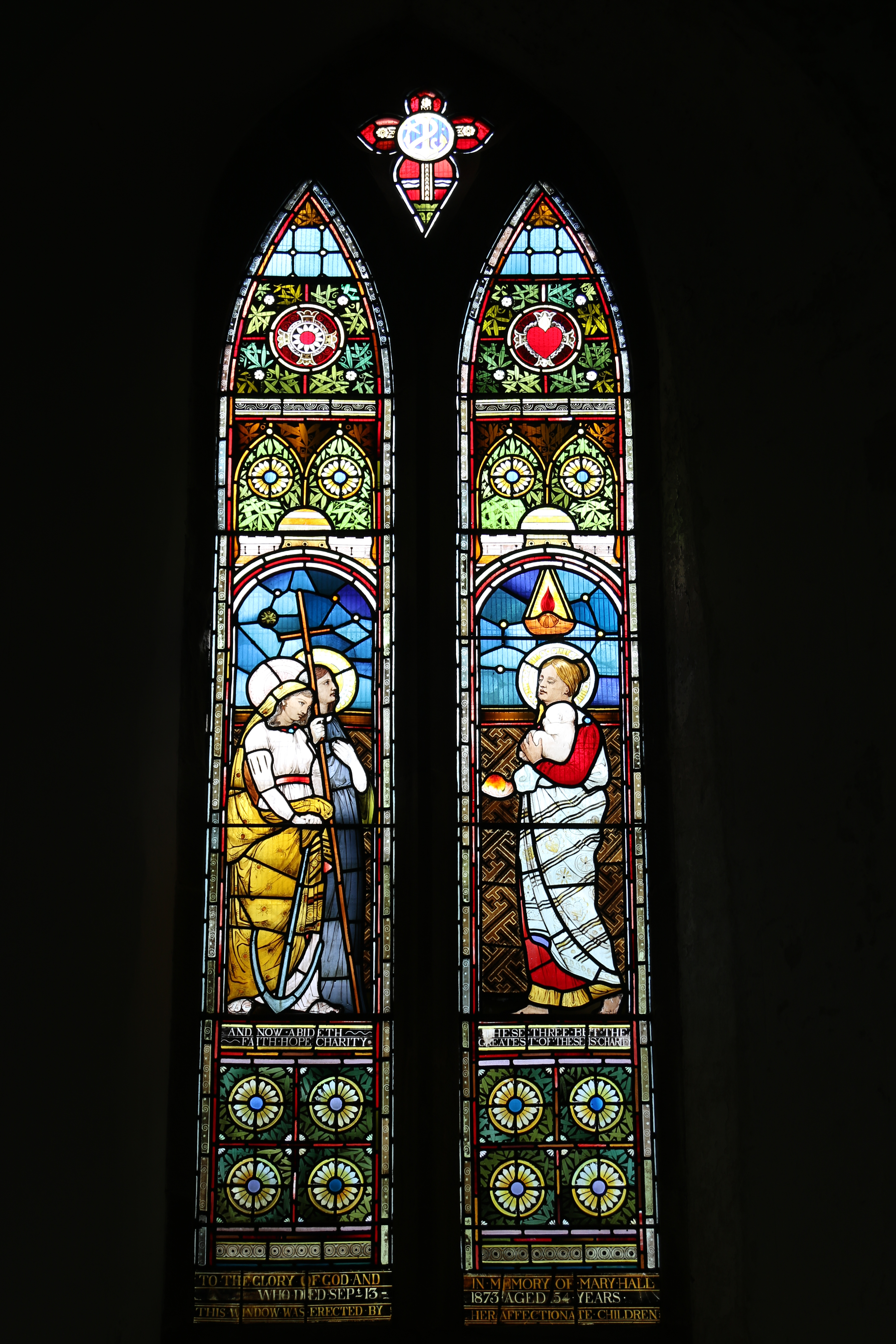
Faith, Hope and Charity

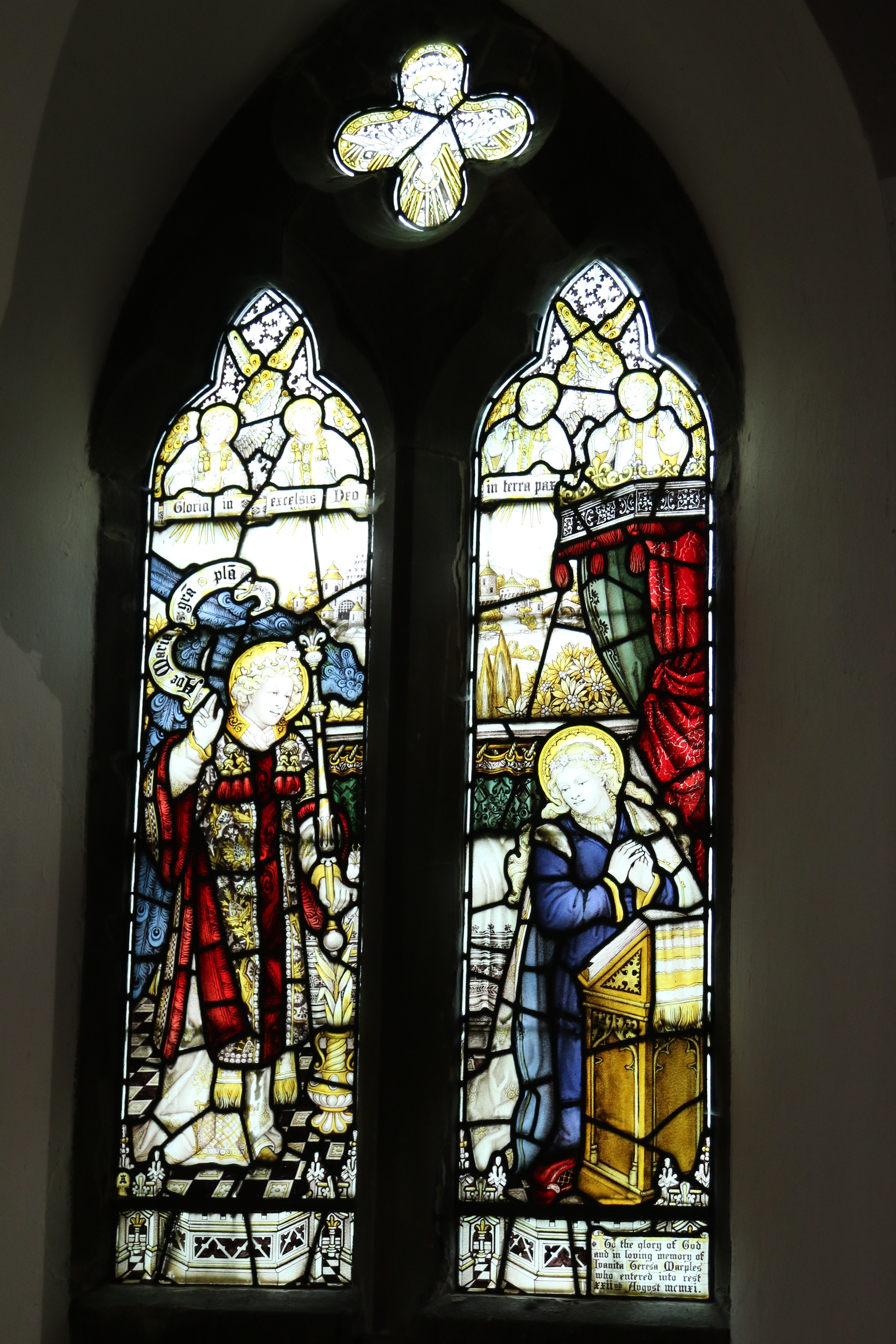
Window in memory of Ivanita Teresa Marples by Charles Eamer Kempe

== See also ==
- Grade II* listed buildings in High Peak
- Listed buildings in Castleton, Derbyshire
