= Castleton Hall =

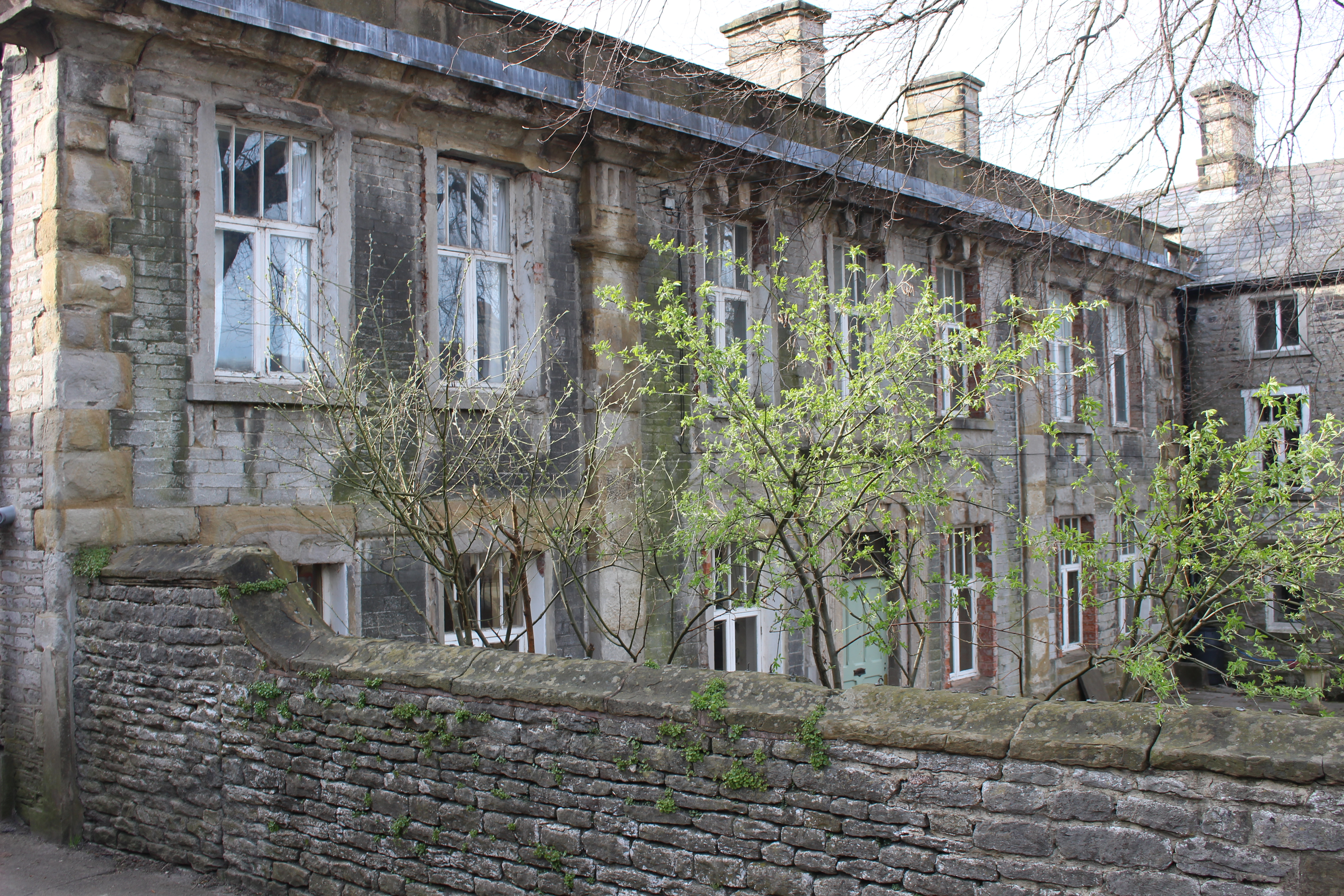
- Castleton Hall

- Location in Derbyshire
- 53°20′31″N 1°46′36″W
- Location: Castleton, Derbyshire, England
- OS grid reference: SK1497382820

Listed Building – Grade II
- Official name: Castleton Hall
- Designated: 25 October 1951
- Reference no.: 1096605

Castleton Hall is an 18th-century grade II listed country hall on Castle Street in Castleton, Derbyshire.

== History ==
Originally built as a large country hall, the house was later divided into smaller dwellings. The hall features Baroque features on the front.

The hall was historically linked to the Hall family that had been in Castleton since at least 1318. In 1814 Isaac Hall inherited the hall from his father Micah Hall.

The building was purchased by the Youth Hostels Association in 1942 and operated as Castleton Youth Hostel from 1943 until 2012, until the new hostel opened at Losehill Hall.

== See also ==
- Listed buildings in Castleton, Derbyshire
