= Losehill Hall =

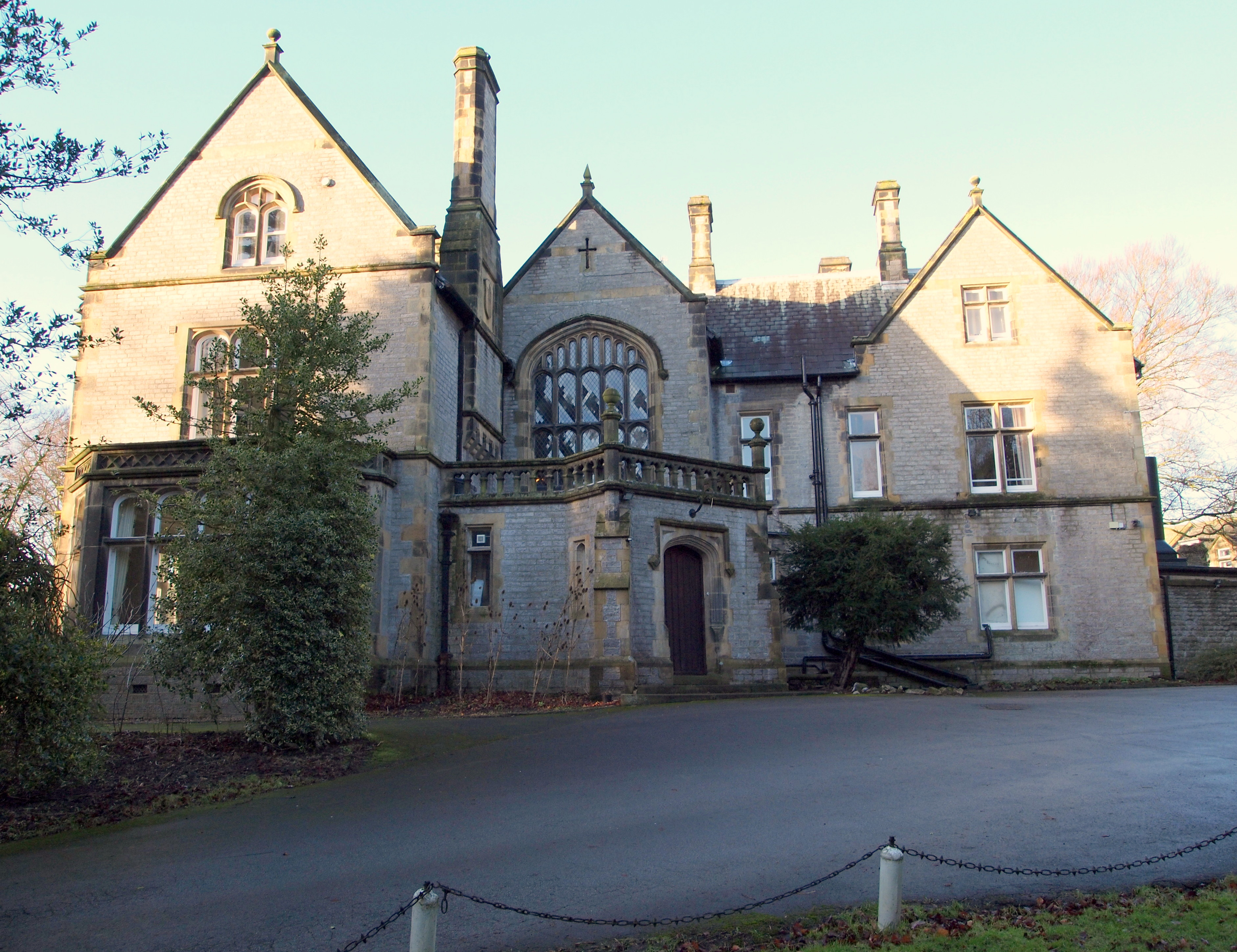
- Losehill Hall

- Location in Derbyshire
- 53°21′04″N 1°46′15″W
- Location: Castleton, Derbyshire, England

Listed Building – Grade II
- Official name: Losehill Hall
- Designated: 24 September 1984
- Reference no.: 1334531

Losehill Hall is a 19th-century grade II listed country hall on Squires Lane on the outskirts of Castleton, Derbyshire. It is currently used as a hostel in the YHA Network.

== History ==
Losehill Hall was built in 1882. The hall was constructed as a residence for Robert How Ashton of Cryer House, and his wife Thomasine Hall, the daughter of Joseph Hall of Castleton Hall. Robert died in 1922 and the estate was sold to Colonel William Chadburn and Helena Chadburn.

From 1953 to 1971 the building was operated as a residential youth centre for members of the British co-operative movement to attend educational and recreational events. The centre was one of four facilities operated by Co-operative Youth Centres Ltd, who owned the site.

The building was subsequently home to an education and learning centre for the next 40 years operated by the Peak District National Park Authority. The Peak District Study Centre closed in 2010 following a reduction in funding at the National Park Authority.

Since 2012 the building has been occupied by a hostel operated by the YHA.

== See also ==
- Listed buildings in Castleton, Derbyshire
