= Castleton War Memorial =

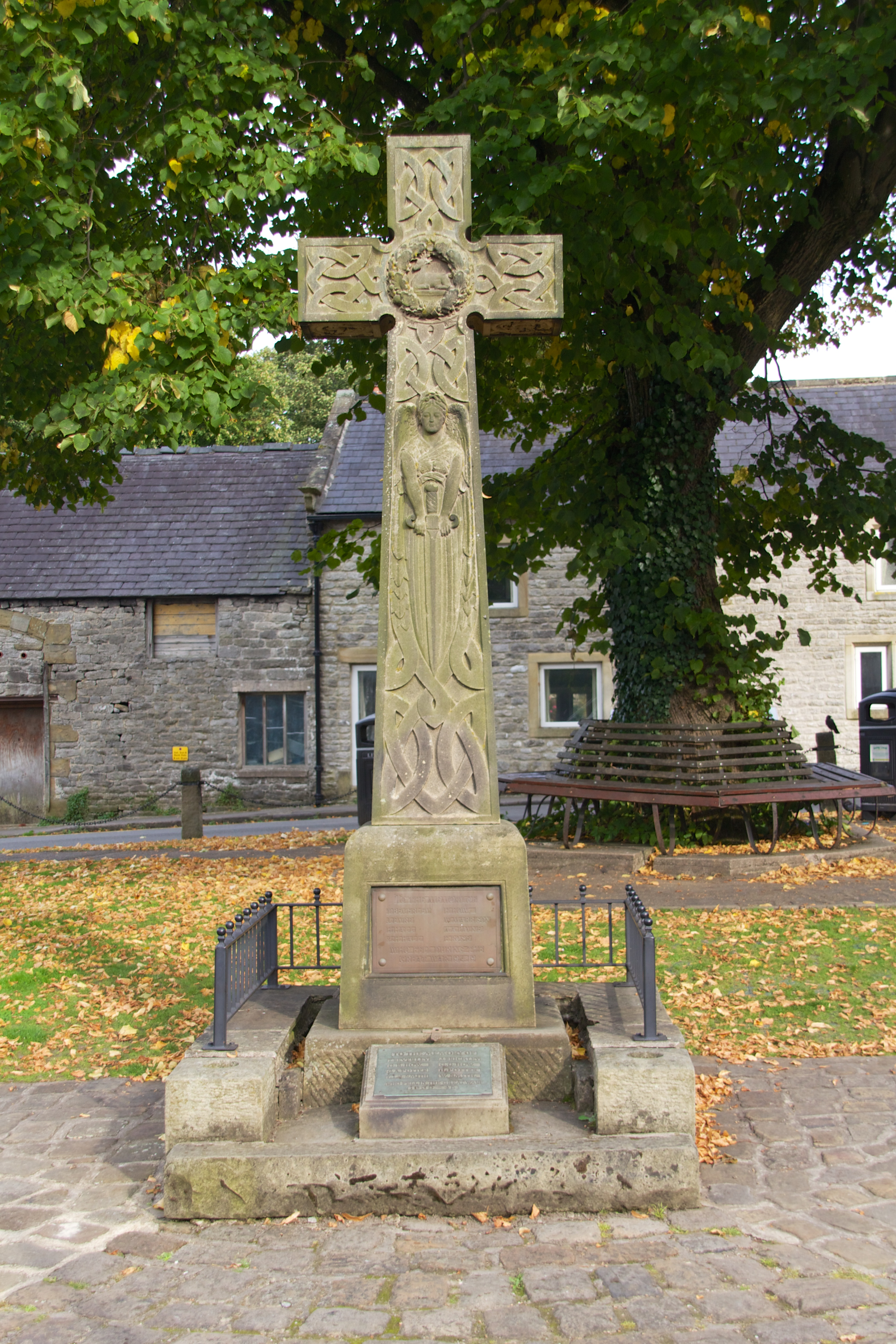
- Castleton War Memorial

- Location in Derbyshire
- 53°20′31″N 1°46′33″W
- Location: Castleton, Derbyshire, England

Listed Building – Grade II
- Official name: War Memorial
- Designated: 17 December 2007
- Reference no.: 1392332

Castleton War Memorial is a 20th-century grade II listed war memorial in Castleton, Derbyshire.

== History ==
The war memorial was unveiled in 1919. It features the names of local residents that died during the First World War. The memorial was later renovated following World War II.

The memorial has been Grade II listed since 17 December 2007.

== See also ==
- Listed buildings in Castleton, Derbyshire
