= Goosehill Hall =

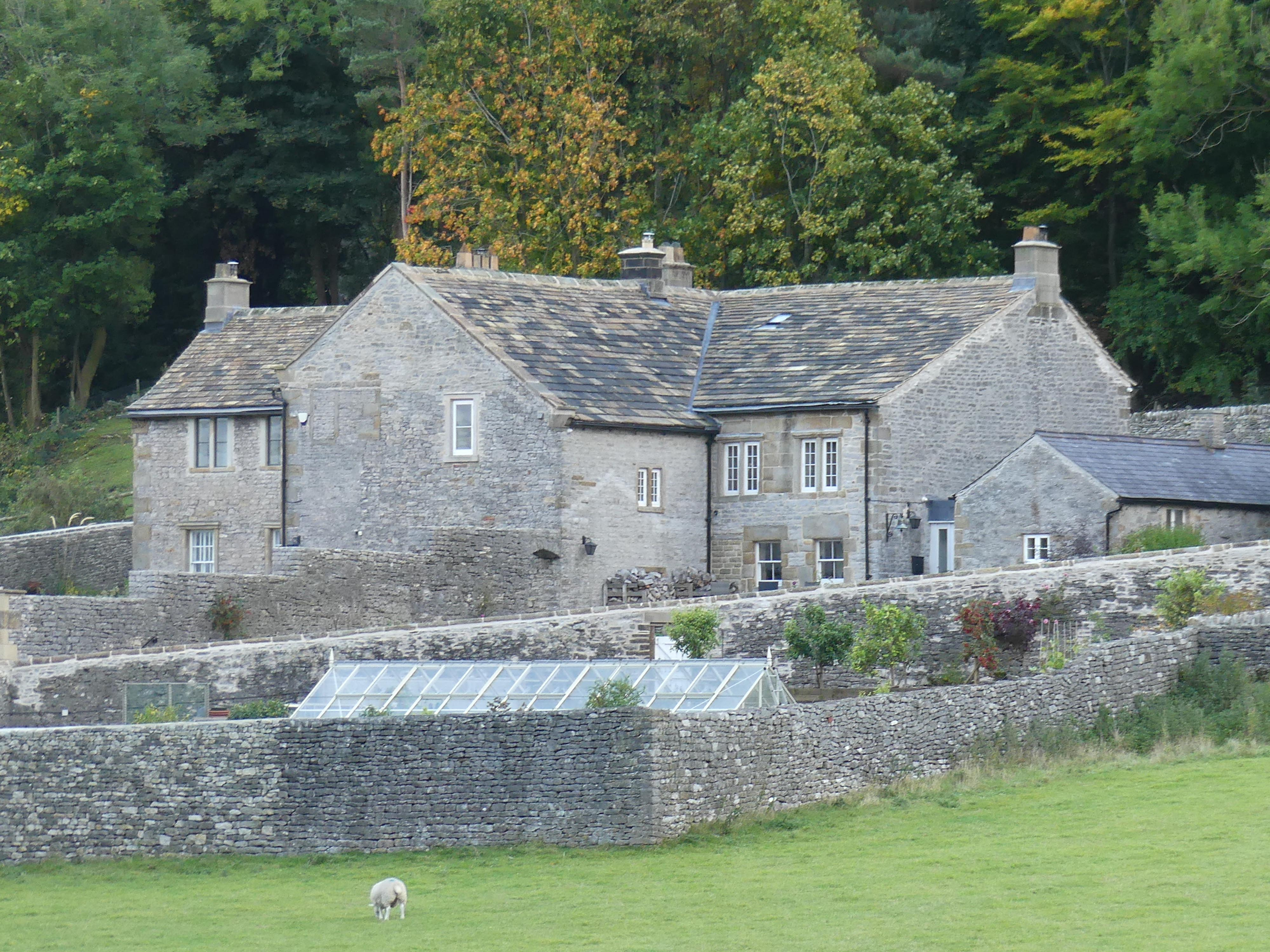
- Goosehill Hall

- Location in Derbyshire
- 53°20′28″N 1°46′49″W
- Location: Castleton, Derbyshire, England

Listed Building – Grade II
- Official name: Goosehill Hall
- Designated: 21 April 1967
- Reference no.: 1334867

Goosehill Hall is an 18th-century Grade II listed country hall on the outskirts of Castleton, Derbyshire.

== History ==
The current Hall was constructed in the late 18th century; however, Richard Torr is recorded as being resident at Goosehill Hall in 1690, and John Hall of Goosehill Hall is recorded as part of a marriage settlement in 1675. Adam Bagshawe of Wormhill Hall, living in 1707, married Alice Tor, the daughter of Richard Tor of Goosehill Hall. In the mid-1700s, their son Richard Bagshaw, High Sheriff of Derbyshire, is recorded as living at the hall. Richard inherited Wormhill Hall and The Oakes upon his brother Adam's death in 1729 and, upon his own death in 1750, left Wormhill Hall and Goosehill to his son John Bashawe. John died without issue, and the hall was left to the second son of his cousin, Col. Samuel Bagshawe of Ford Hall.

Today the hall is used as tourist holiday cottages.

== Outbuildings ==
The barn at Goosehill Hall, dating back to the 18th century, is also Grade II listed, as are the gate piers.

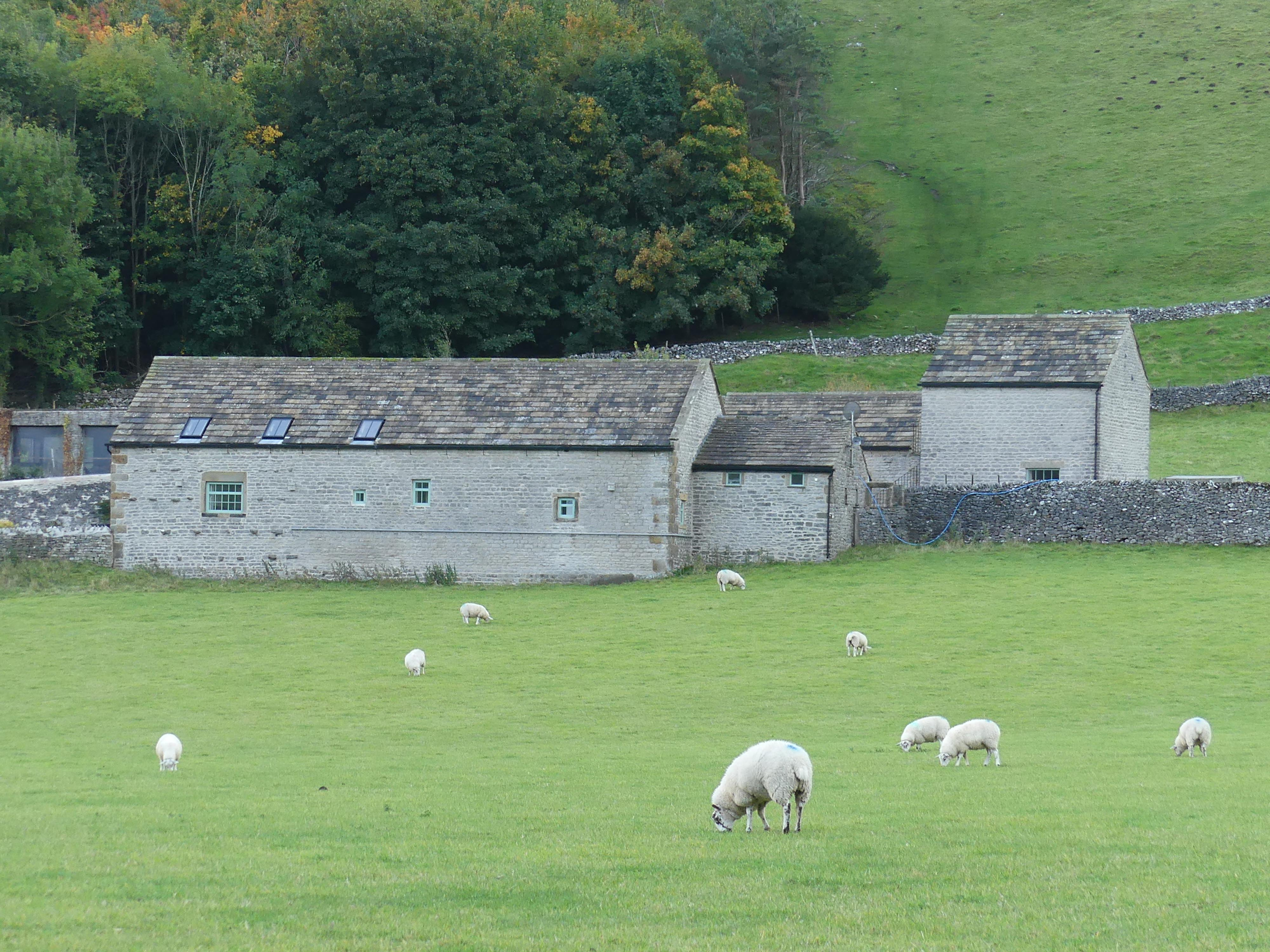
Barn

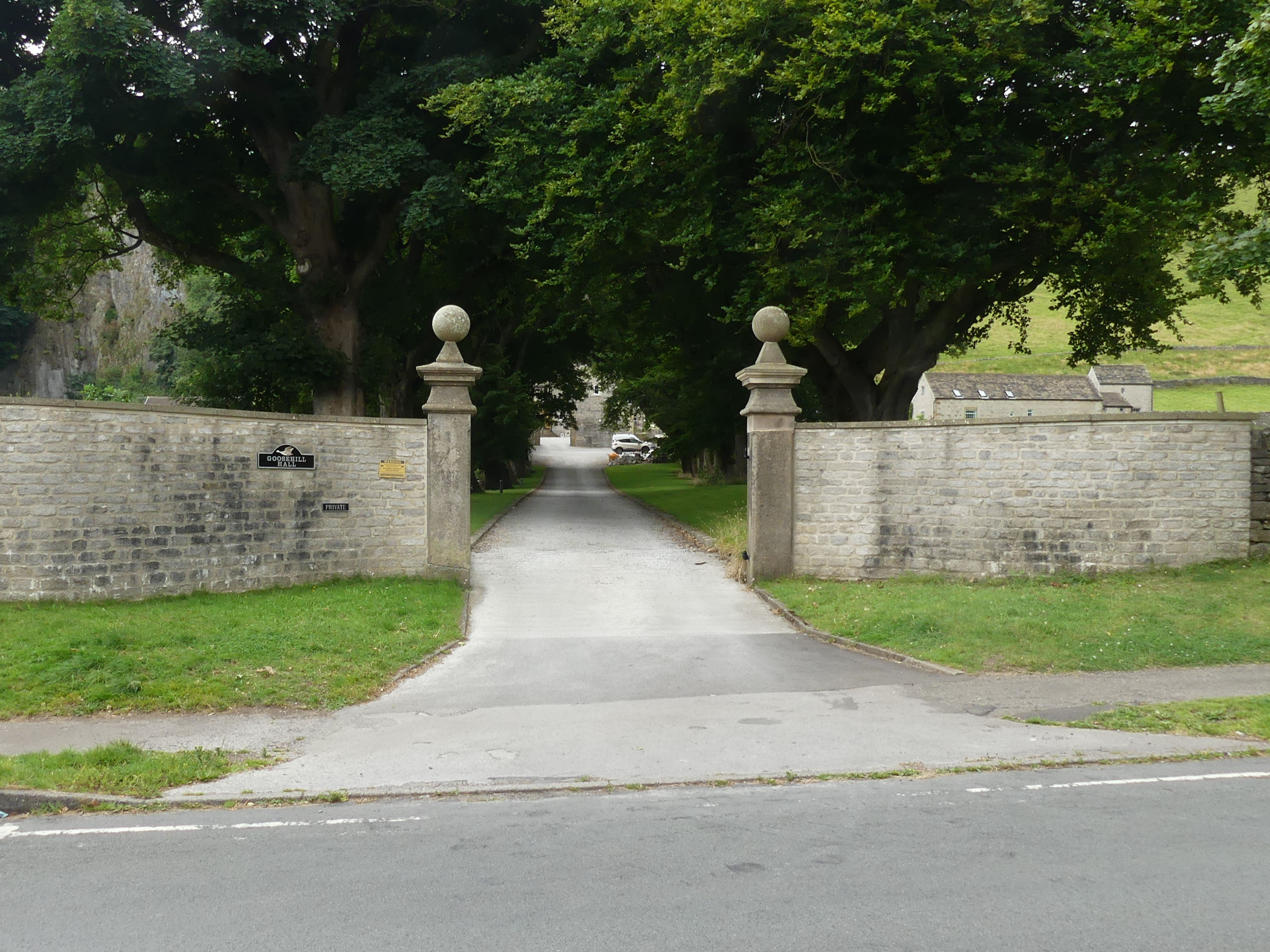
Gate piers

== See also ==
- Listed buildings in Castleton, Derbyshire
