= Castleton, Derbyshire =

Village and civil parish in England

Coordinates: 53.344°N 1.775°W

Castleton
- Village
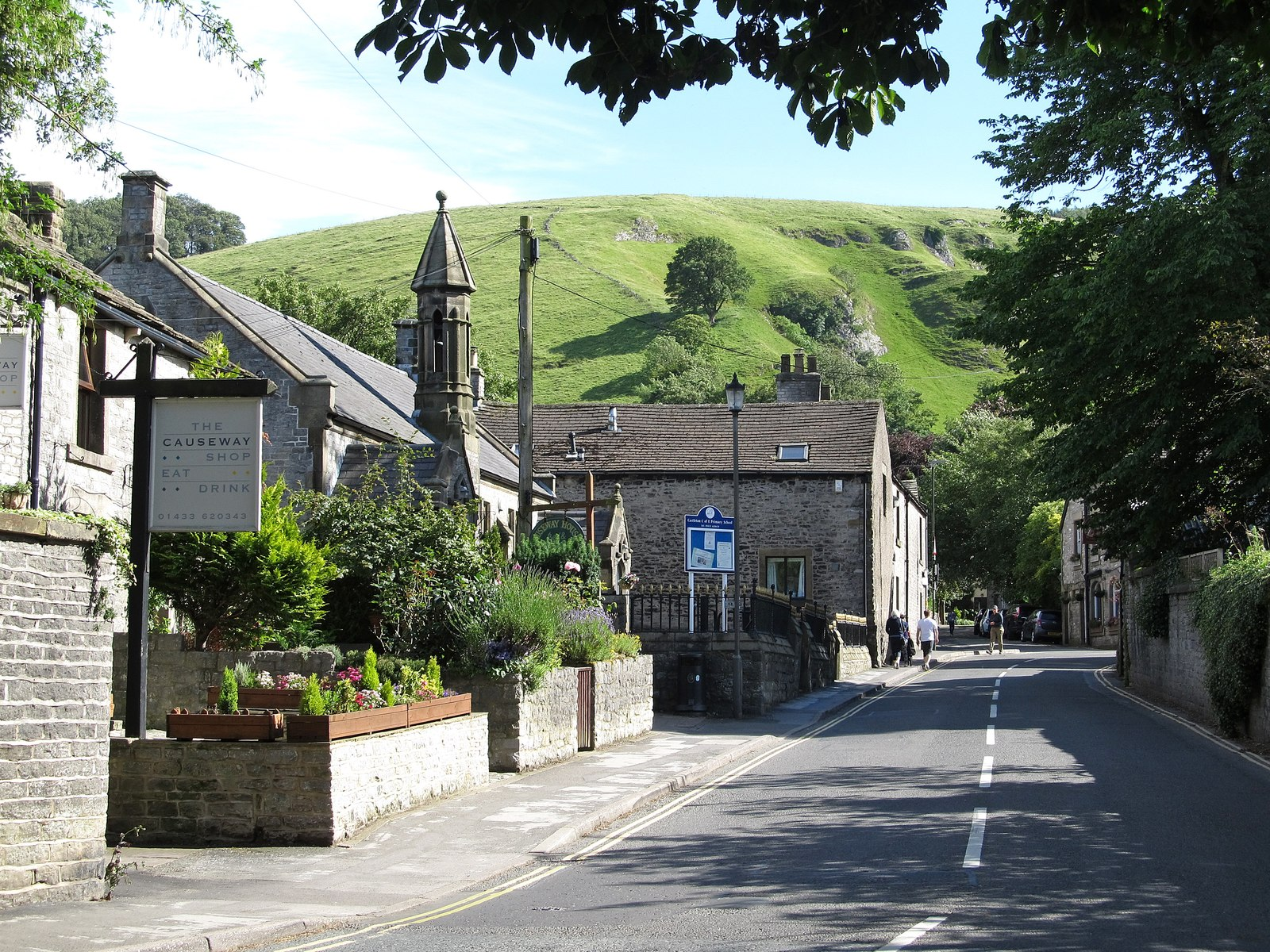
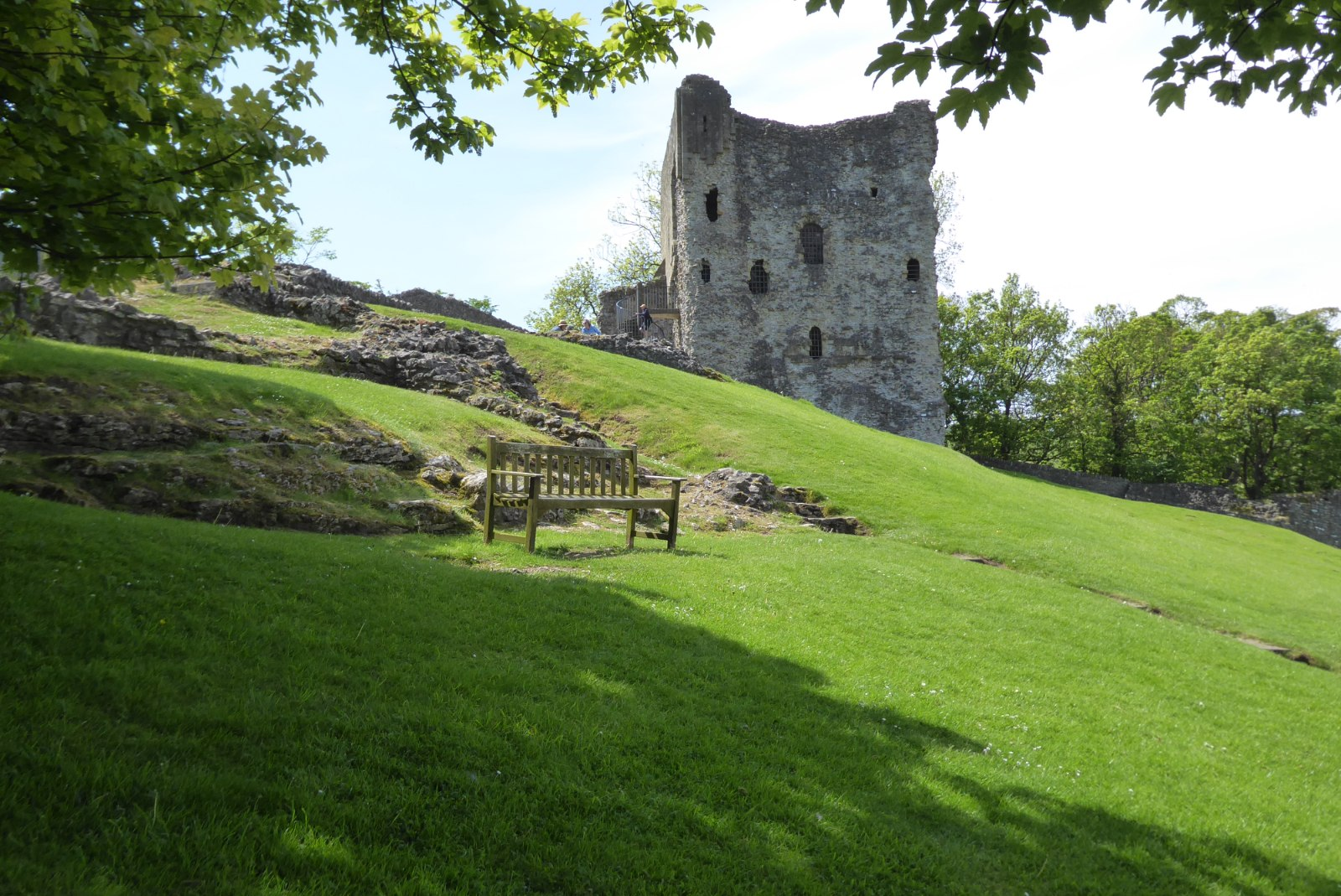
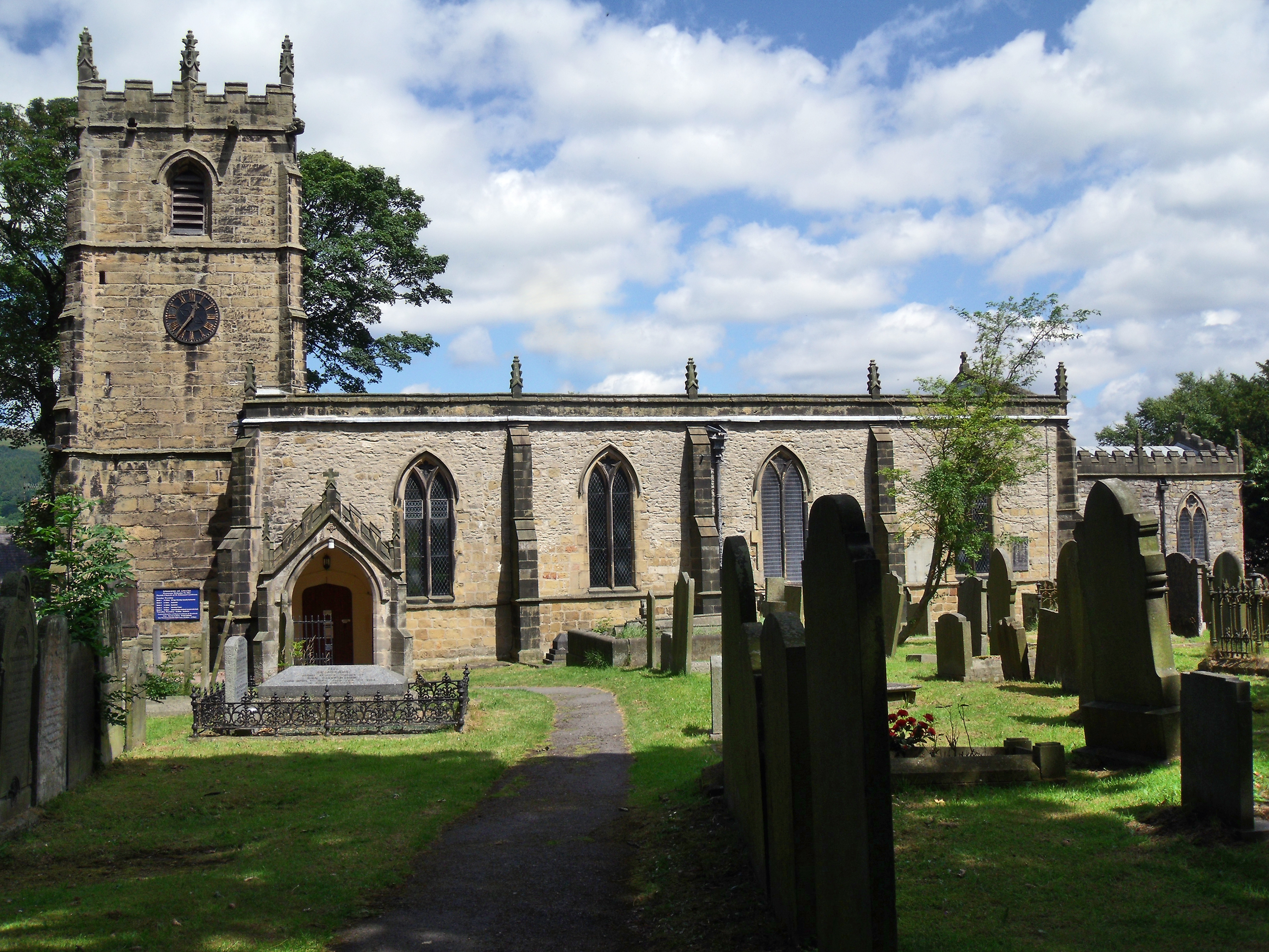
- Back Street Peveril Castle St Edmunds Church

- Location within Derbyshire
- Population: 544
- OS grid reference: SK1583
- Civil parish: Castleton
- District: High Peak
- Shire county: Derbyshire
- Region: East Midlands
- Country: England
- Sovereign state: United Kingdom
- Post town: HOPE VALLEY
- Postcode district: S33
- Dialling code: 01433
- Police: Derbyshire
- Fire: Derbyshire
- Ambulance: East Midlands
- UK Parliament: High Peak
- Website: https://castletonvillage.co.uk/minutes-agendas/#

Castleton is a village and civil parish in the High Peak district of Derbyshire, England, at the western end of the Hope Valley on the Peakshole Water, a tributary of the River Noe, between the Dark Peak to the north and the White Peak to the south. The population was 544 at the 2021 Census.

== History ==
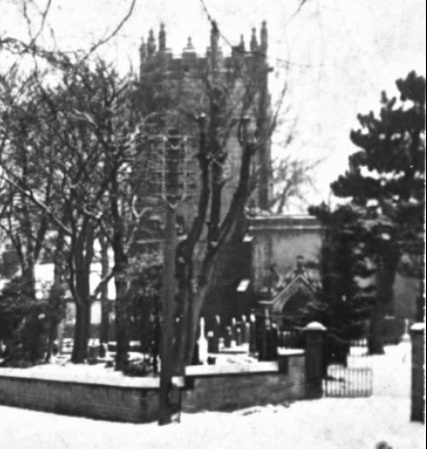
St Edmund's Church in a 1955 snowfall

Castleton village was mentioned as Pechesers in Domesday Book in 1086 where "Arnbiorn and Hundingr held the land of William Peverel's castle in Castleton". This land and Peverel's castle were amongst the manors belonging to William Peverel that also included Bolsover and Glapwell.

St Edmund's Norman church was restored about 1837. It has late 13th-century tracery and an ashlar-faced Perpendicular tower. Its box pews are dated 1661, 1662, 1663 and 1676.

A medieval leper hospital (the Hospital of Saint Mary in the Peak) is thought to have been on the eastern boundary of Castleton, though some locals believe it to have been just south of the Speedwell Cavern footpath from the village. University of Sheffield archaeologists are investigating 'Castle of the Peak', which was reputedly founded by the wife of one of the William Peverels before 1153, and continued until about the 1543 Dissolution. They say the earliest documents referring to Spital Field are a grant and a Charter from the early 14th century. They are also investigating the 12th-century planned town at the foot of the castle hill. Castleton's medieval town defences are still evident in the village and are a Scheduled monument.

Castleton had a long history of lead mining; the Odin Mine, one of the oldest lead mines in the country, is situated 1.5 kilometres (0.9 mi) west of the village (see also Derbyshire lead mining history). Researchers studying an ice core from a Swiss glacier have found that levels of lead air pollution across Europe during the period 1170–1216 were as high as those of the Industrial Revolution, and the principal source was Peak District mines such as Castleton and Wirksworth. The mining created and enlarged local caverns, four of which are now open to the public as Peak Cavern, Blue John Cavern, Speedwell Cavern and Treak Cliff Cavern. A small amount of Blue John is mined locally and sold in local gift shops, one of which is located in the 17th-century tollhouse.

Since the 1920s the main mineral industry in the area has been cement. Hope Cement Works is closer to Hope but its quarry is closer to Castleton. A war memorial stands in the Market Place, in memory of local residents who died during both World Wars.

== Geography ==
Castleton is situated between the gritstone plateau of the Dark Peak to the north and the gentler limestone scenery of the White Peak to the south. It lies at the western end of the Hope Valley and consequently is surrounded on three sides by hills. Most prominent is the ridge to the north. This is called Great Ridge; it runs east from Mam Tor to Back Tor and Lose Hill, via the pass (hause) of Hollins Cross, where paths from many directions converge and cross over to Edale. Alexander von Humboldt visited caves near Castleton and Buxton in June 1790 to investigate the region's geological structures.

Castleton was formerly on the A625 road from Sheffield to Chapel-en-le-Frith, on the way to Manchester. Leaving Castleton, the western road once went over Mam Tor, but after continual landslides and repairs - Mam Tor is called the "Shivering Mountain" because of its very loose shales - it was eventually abandoned. The only westbound exit from Castleton is now the unclassified road over the narrow Winnats Pass. This road is very narrow and steep and unsuitable for heavy vehicles or high volumes. Road signage has been designed to discourage through traffic by showing only local destinations. Thus most traffic enters and leaves the village on the eastern (Hope-Hathersage-Sheffield) road (A6187); traffic going west has to make a long diversion via the villages of Bradwell and Peak Forest.

Castleton has a small bus station from where buses depart hourly to Sheffield (services 272/273) and 2-hourly to Tideswell and Bakewell (service 173). Sunday services on route 173 and less frequent services, including services 68 to Buxton, 174 Baslow, Ladybower (273 & 274), 200 Chapel-en-le-frith and Edale 276, were cut in 2017 after cuts in government funding. At summer weekends buses link to Chesterfield, Glossop and Ladybower.

There is no railway station, but Hope station is about 3 kilometres (1.9 mi) away, and train tickets to Hope and Edale are valid on connecting buses to Castleton.

=== Education ===
Castleton Church of England Primary School was rated 'good' in its 2017 Ofsted inspection. From October 2017 the school and surrounding area have been featured in the ident used by Channel 4.

The nearest secondary school is Hope Valley College.

=== Tourism ===
Castleton attracts many tourists, and there are several pubs (some with accommodation), tea shops and guest houses to supply their needs. There is also a large car park, a Visitor Centre housing a dedicated space for Castleton Historical Society’s museum, several outdoors shops and a youth hostel. Many schools visit the area for educational studies such as GCSE fieldwork. It is also a major walking centre, where routes up Cave Dale, Winnats Pass, Mam Tor and Hollins Cross meet. There are four show caves: Blue John Cavern, Peak Cavern, Treak Cliff Cavern and Speedwell Cavern, which includes an underground boat ride, and at least one of them is open all year. Castleton has a combined post office and general shop.

On Castleton Garland Day (Oak Apple Day – 29 May), a Garland King is paraded around the streets wearing an extremely large garland of flowers, followed by local girls dressed in white with flowers.

Castleton is a favourite area for walkers: there is plenty of accommodation, and there are many public footpaths leading from the village. There are easy walks along the river to Hope, Brough, Bamford and (rather further) Hathersage, and there is a short strenuous walk up onto the Great Ridge, where views can be enjoyed before descending to Edale or returning to Castleton. Hayfield is a short day's walk away beyond Rushup Edge. A two- or three-day long-distance path, the Limestone Way, starts in Castleton and runs south down Cave Dale (past the rear of the castle) before climbing out of the village and heading for Monyash, Youlgreave and Matlock.

Film of Castleton in 1945 is held by the Cinema Museum in London. Ref HM0365.

== Transport ==
Buses are run by High Peak, Andrew’s of Tideswell, First South Yorkshire and Stagecoach Yorkshire.

== Photo gallery ==
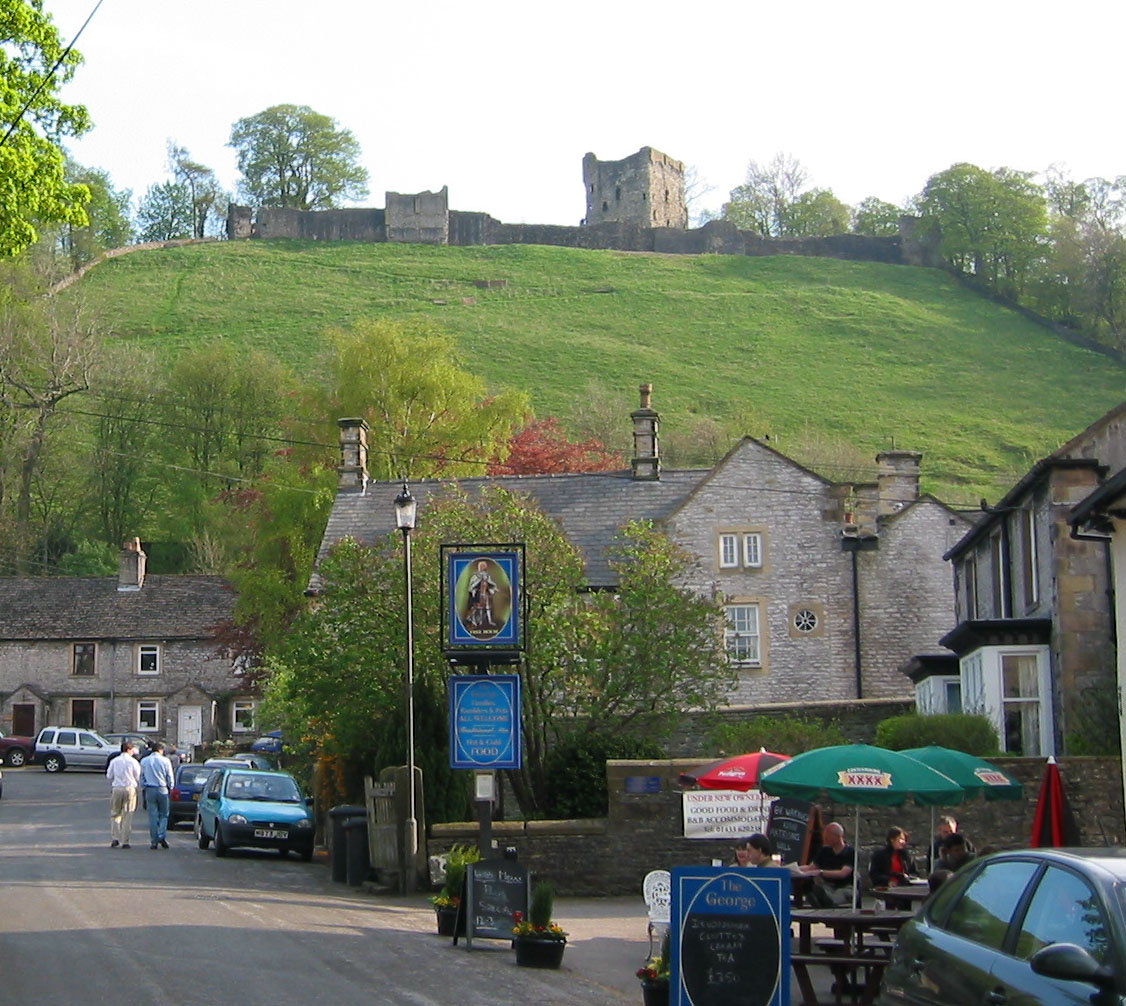
Peveril Castle dominates the southern Castleton skyline

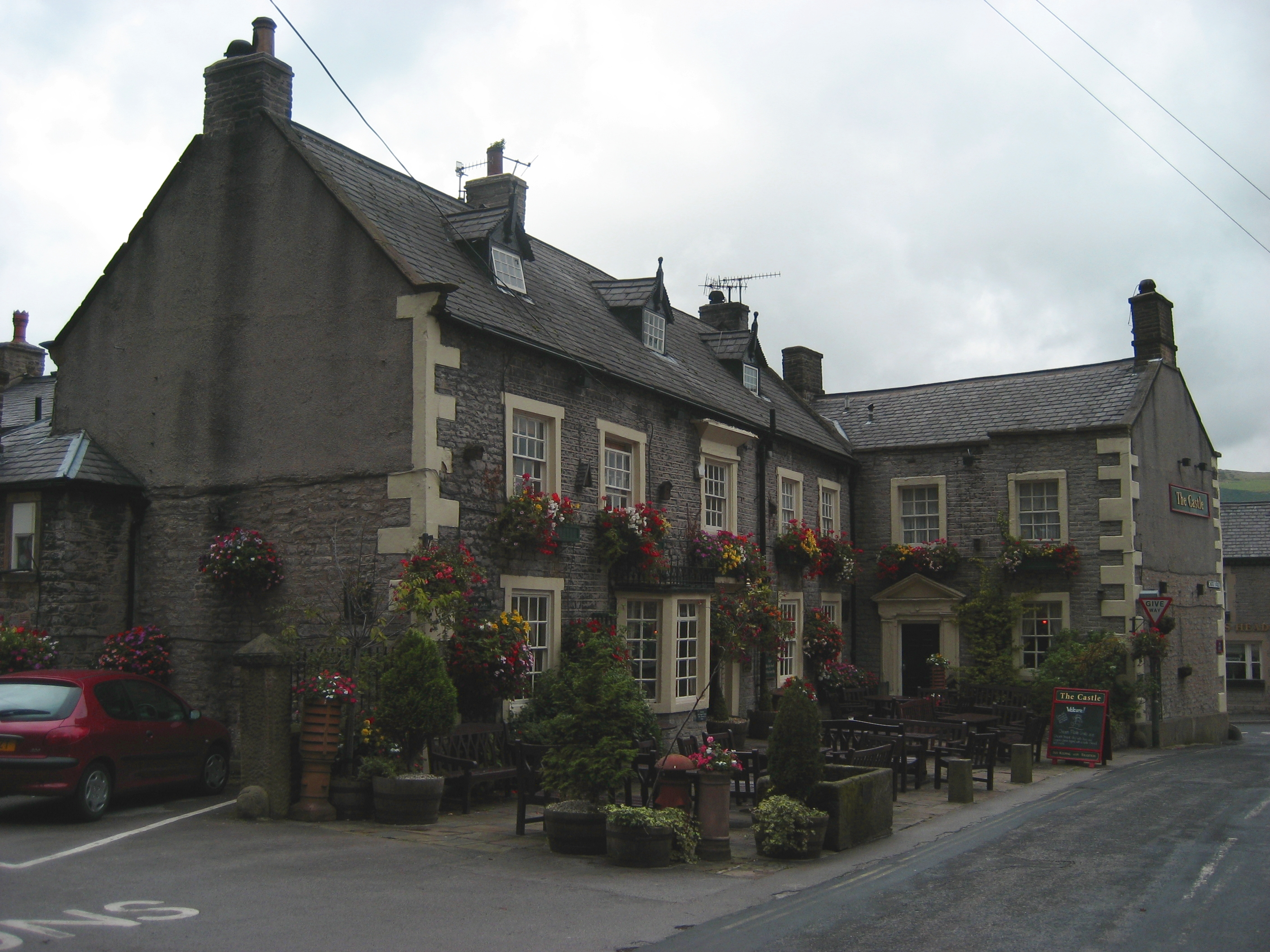
The Castle Hotel

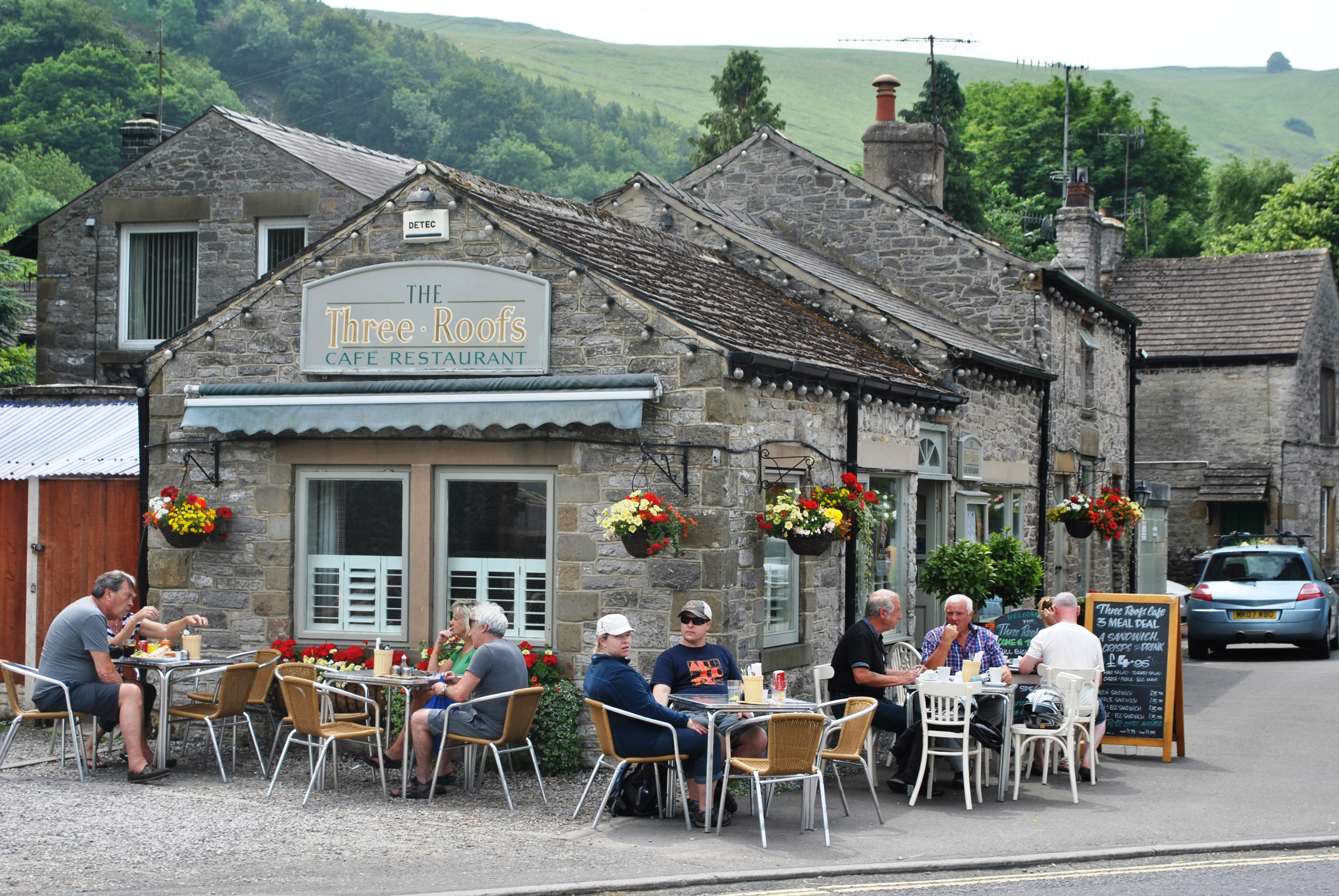
The Three Roofs Café

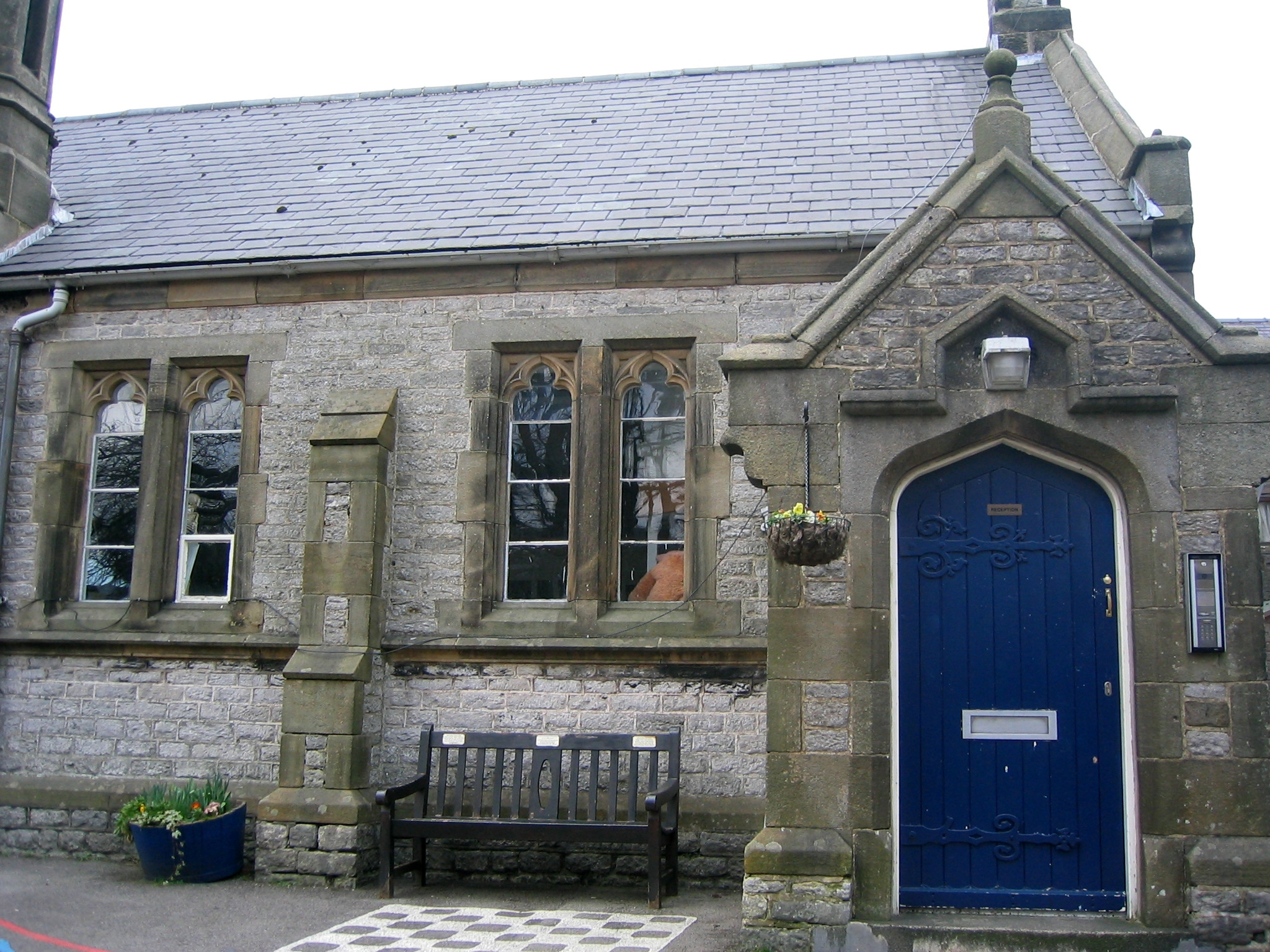
The school in Castleton

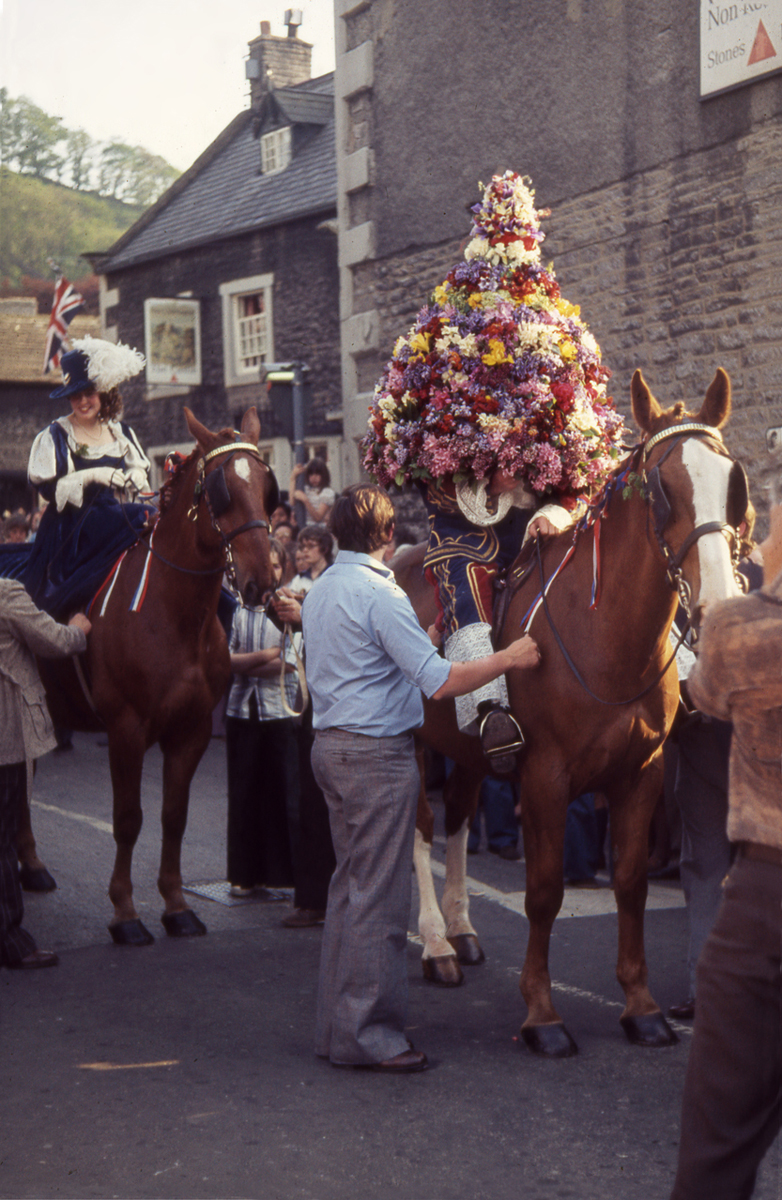
The Castleton Garland King and his consort

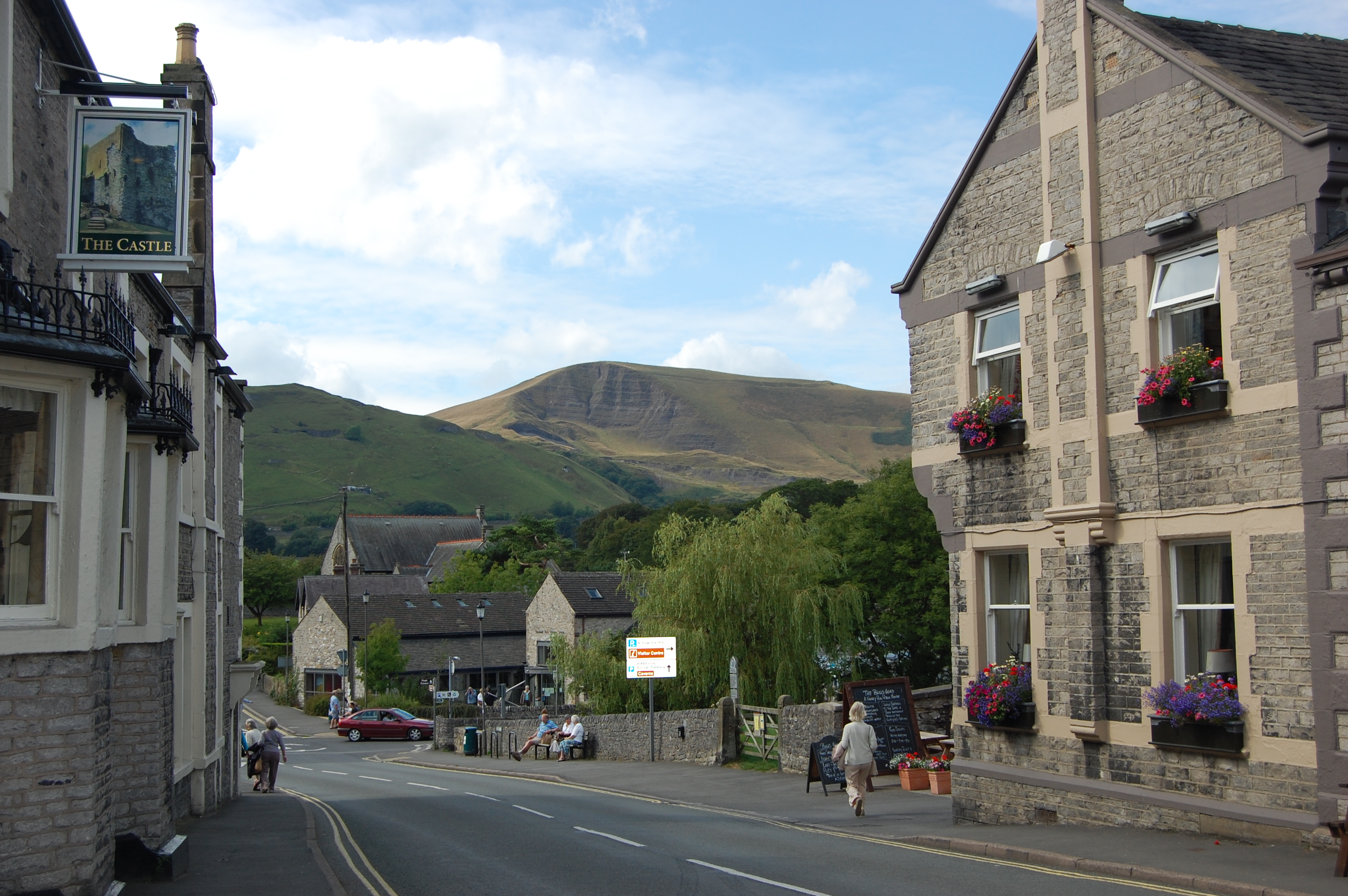
Looking west, Mam Tor towers above the main street of Castleton

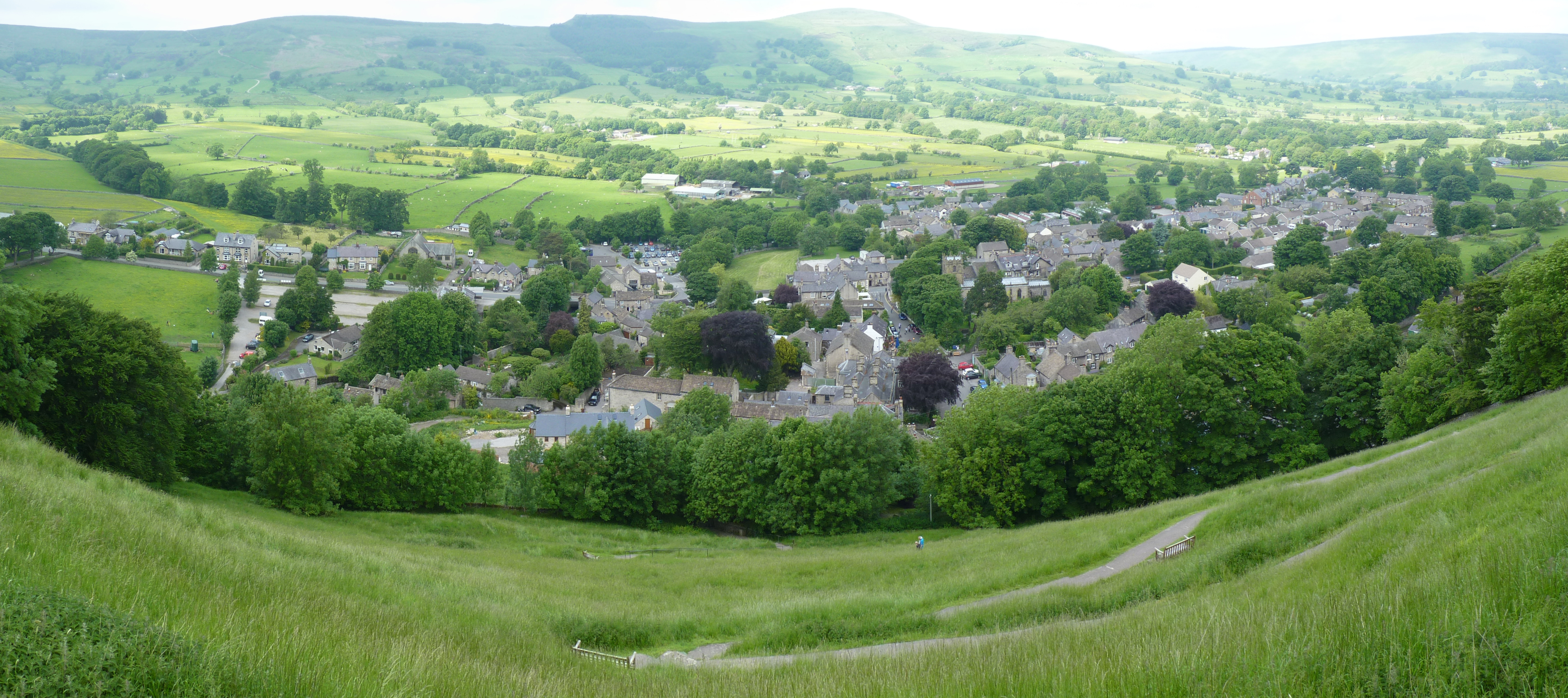
Panoramic view of Castleton from Peveril castle

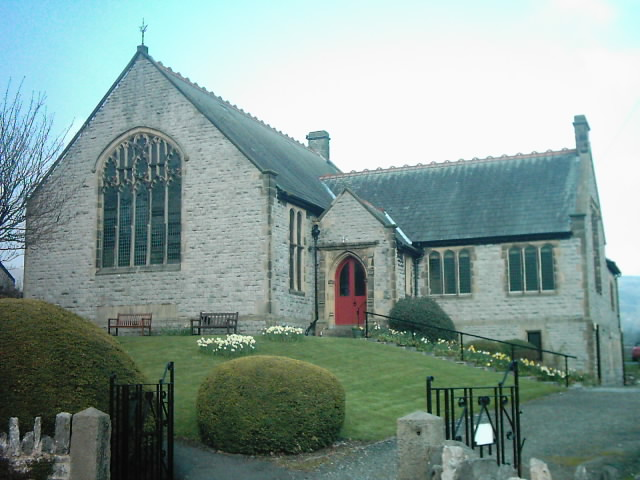
Castleton Methodist Church

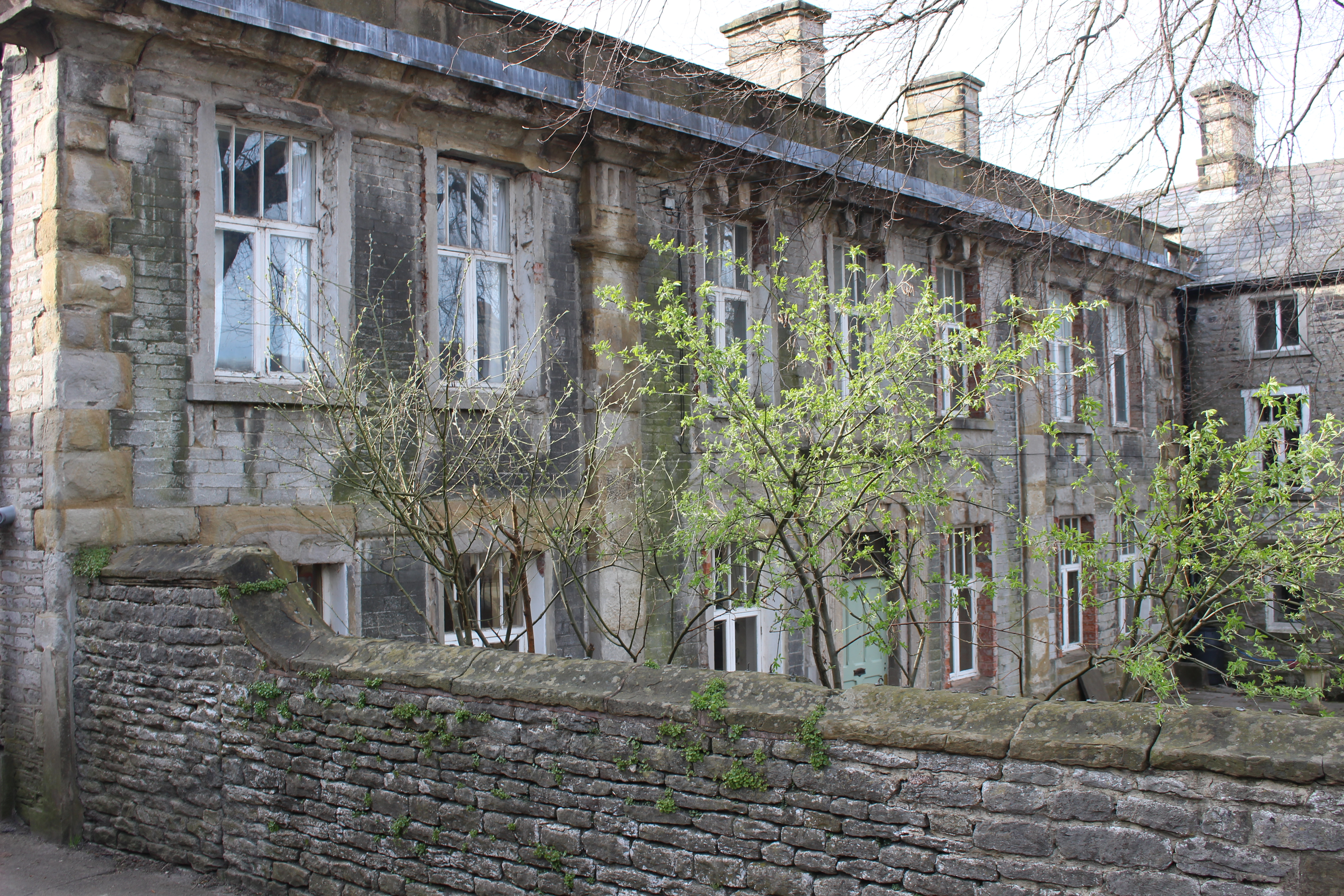
Castleton Hall

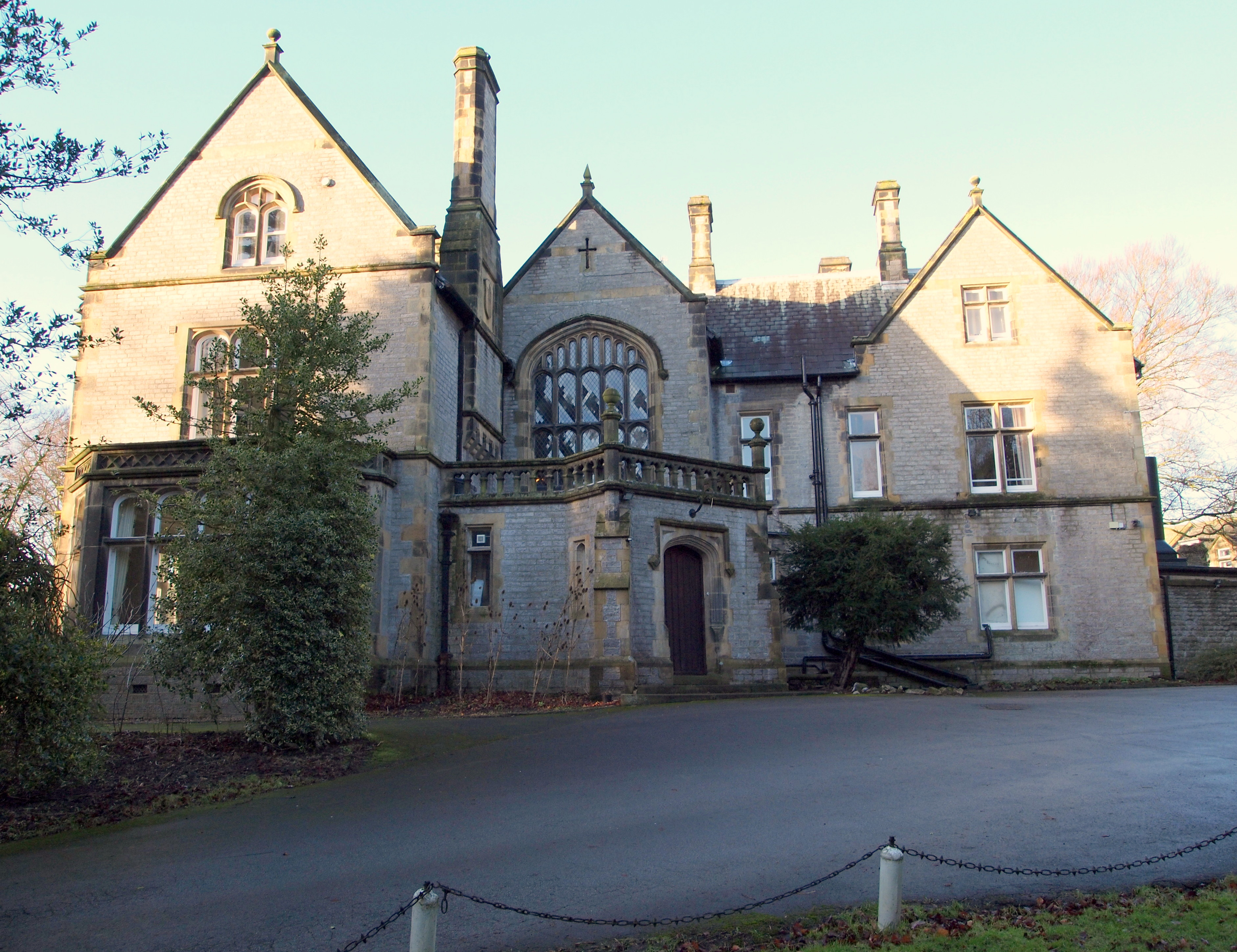
Losehill Hall

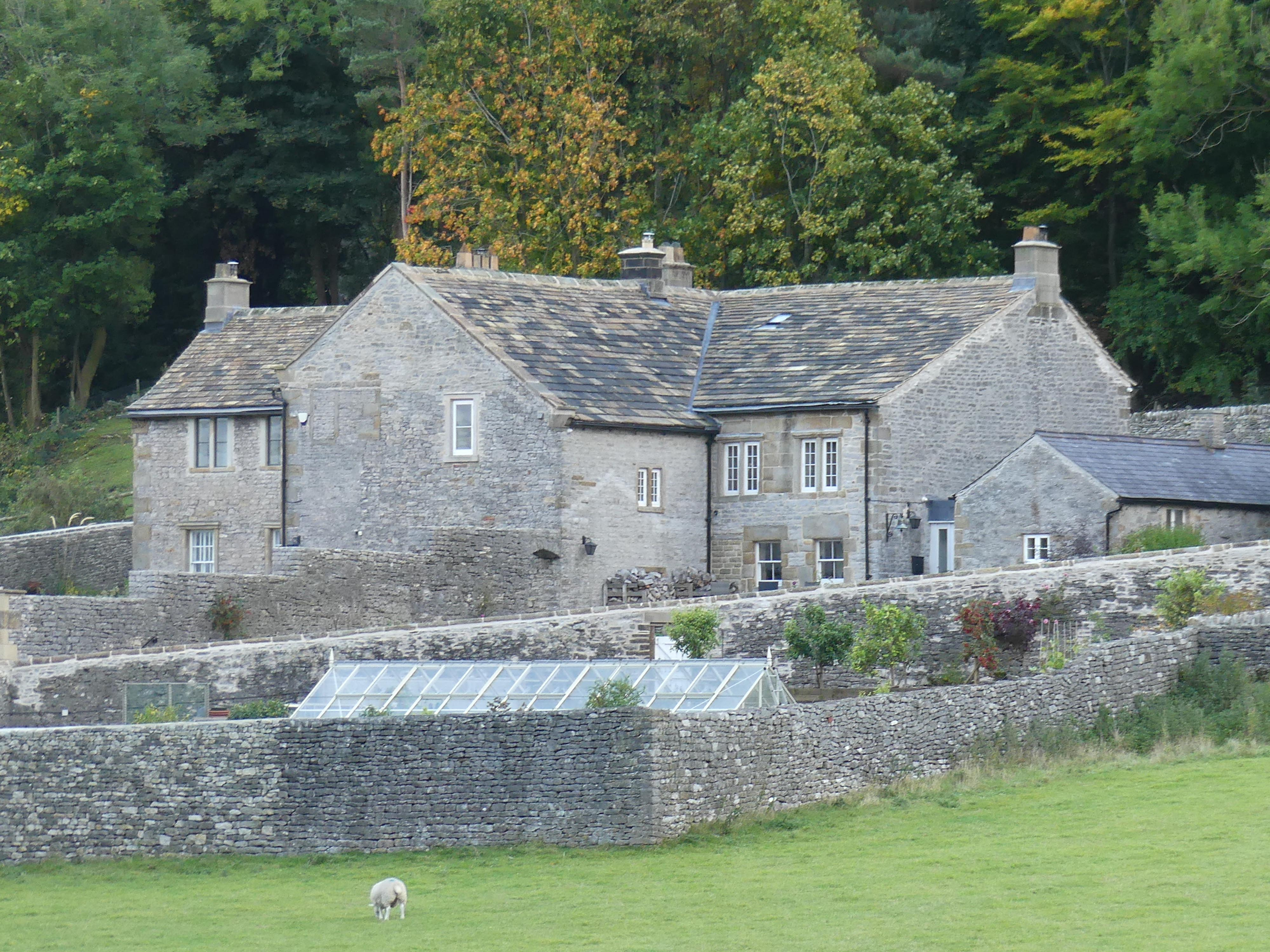
Goosehill Hall

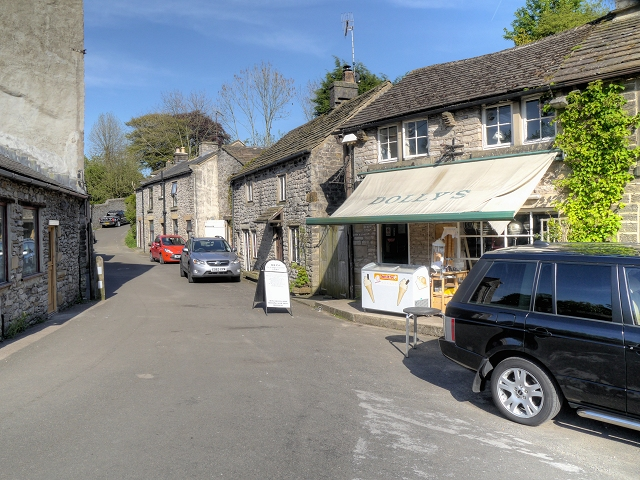
The Stones

== Notable people ==
- Isaac Ambrose (1604–1664), a Puritan divine and author, churchman here in 1627.
- Samuel Bagshawe (1713–1762), soldier and politician, lived at Goosehill Hall
- Charles Roe (1715–1781), industrialist in the mining and metal industries.
- William Boyd Dawkins (1837–1929), geologist and archaeologist, he found important fossils near Castleton
- John Broadbent (1872–1938), army officer, politician and MP for Ashton-under-Lyne, 1931 to 1935
- Debbie Rush (born 1966), actress, played Anna Windass in Coronation Street
- Drenge (formed 2010) a three-piece blues rock band

== In fiction ==
The village was featured in episode 3 of Most Haunted: Midsummer Murders where the team "investigates" the 18th-century murder of an engaged couple. Much of the "investigation" takes place in Speedwell Cavern. One of the conspirators, James Ashton, is said to have confessed to the murders on his deathbed after being haunted by the dead couple. He also implicated others involved. Castleton also featured in national news reports in the early 1980s following the murder of Susan Renhard near the battlements of Peveril Castle.

The local caves were used as the filming location for the underworld, ruled by the evil Lady of the Green Kirtle, in the 1990 BBC adaptation of The Silver Chair (one of the Narnia books written by C.S. Lewis). Cave Dale features in the films The Princess Bride (1987) and The Other Boleyn Girl (2008).

The town is also featured briefly in the play The Devil is an Ass by Ben Jonson, first performed in 1616, and in the poem National Trust by Tony Harrison.

== See also ==
- Listed buildings in Castleton, Derbyshire
