= Castleton Gardens =

Botanical garden in Jamaica

Coordinates: 18°10′19″N 76°49′22″W

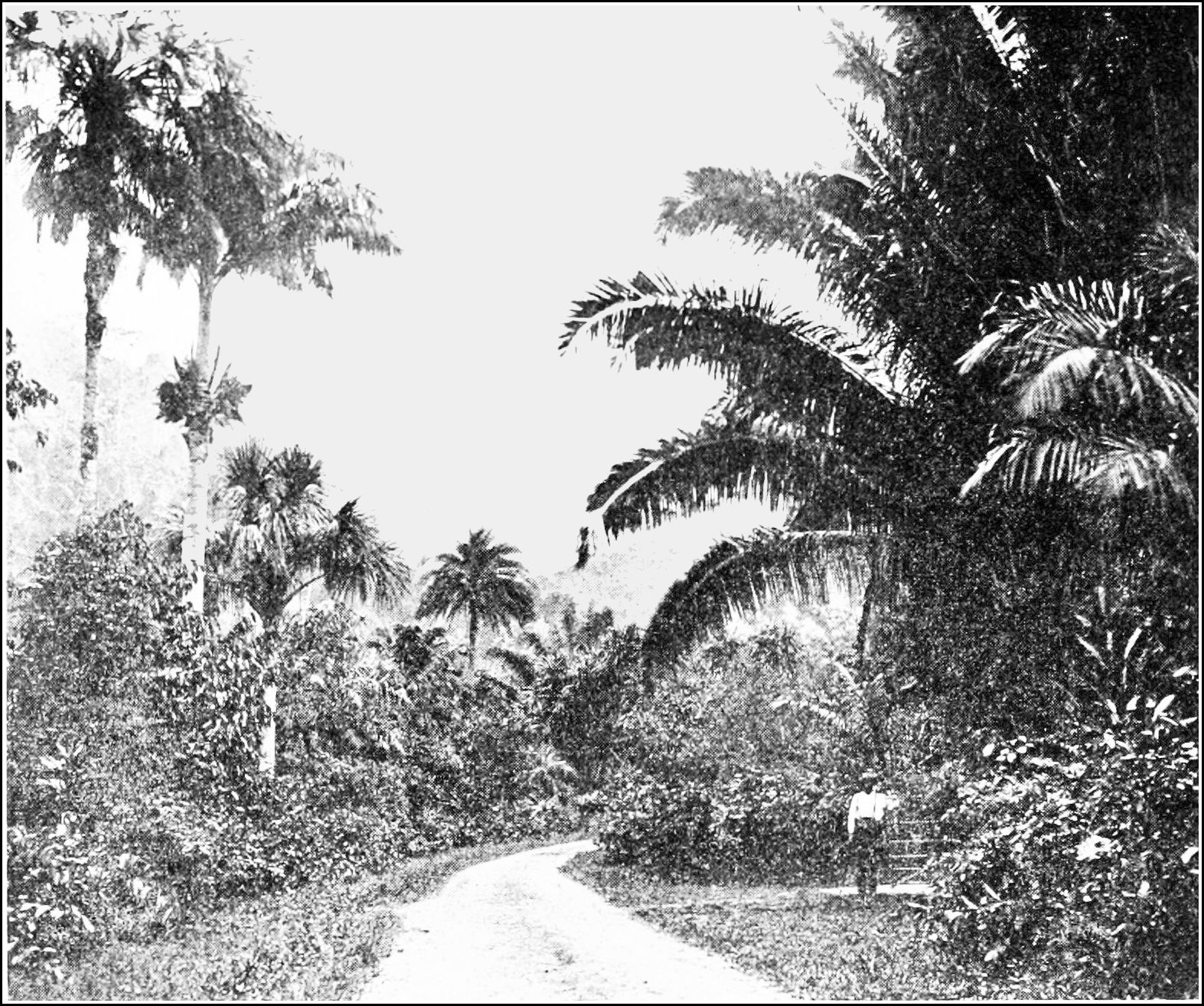
The entrance to the gardens in 1915

Castleton Botanical Garden is a horticultural site of interest established in 1862 and located 19 miles from Kingston, Jamaica. Soon after their creation the gardens were "the most richly stocked in the Caribbean, boasting over 180 species of palm and at least 400 specimens of other flora".
