= David Webb (filmmaker) =

English filmmaker and caver (born 1935)

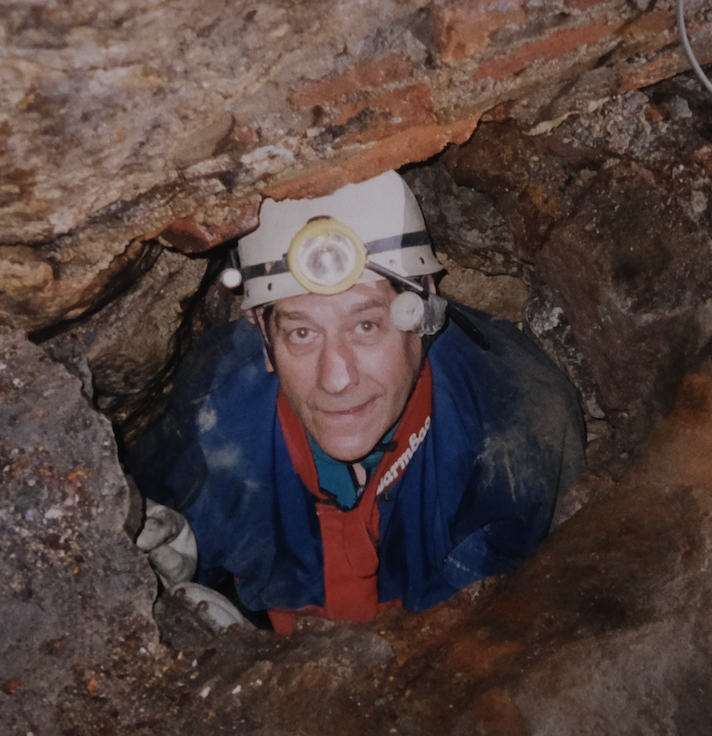

David Webb (born 26 April 1935) is an English filmmaker, caver and conservationist. He has produced over a dozen films about caving and mine exploration (mostly in the Derbyshire region) and has contributed articles to Descent magazine.

== Early and personal life ==
Originally from Grimsby, Webb graduated in pharmacy and remained in pharmacy management up until his retirement. In 1958, he was called up for national service in charge of medical stores and dispensary at a hospital in Malaysia during the Malayan Emergency. Webb later moved to Nottingham with his family in 1963.

== Films ==
Webb's films have been presented to outdoor enthusiasts and made available in museums, caving shops and visitor centres across Derbyshire. Extracts from his films have been televised on programmes such as The One Show and Countryfile. He has been a regular feature at the Hidden Earth caving conference.

Webb is particularly known for his film Fight For Life: The Neil Moss Story about the death of Neil Moss in Peak Cavern in 1959. The film is notable for its detailed account of the rescue attempt and interviews with individuals who were present at the rescue operation.

His film To Titan From The Top documented a three-year dig by Dave 'Moose" Nixon and team as they attempted to excavate a direct path from above to the deepest cave in Britain: Titan near Castleton, Peak District.

After inheriting the 1968 film Underground Journey on 16mm, Webb undertook its digitisation and subsequent DVD production which includes an interview with expedition leader Doug Nash.

Webb was commissioned by the Ecton Hill Field Studies Association to produce a film of the Ecton Mines as a record of this historic site.

== Conservation work ==
As Conservation Officer for the Derbyshire Caving Association (DCA) he played an integral role in setting up the Site of Special Scientific Interest Monitoring Scheme for Natural England which audited the special features of 67 caves in the Peak District. This led to it being the first region in the U.K. to complete the monitoring of cave SSIs, for which Webb and the DCA received an award.

With the help of volunteer cavers, Webb oversaw the removal of accumulated waste at various cave sites throughout the county, rendering them to an 'acceptable condition' after years of neglect.

As well as implementing the Cave Conservation Monitoring Scheme, he also coordinated regular meetings of landowners, caving instructors and representatives from organisations such as the National Trust, English Heritage, Bat Conservation Trust and Natural England.

== Awards ==
In 2000, the Film and Video Institute awarded Webb the title LACI for his standard of filmmaking.

In 2012, Webb won the prestigious Giles Barker Award in recognition of excellence in his work in cave videography for over 20 years.

== Filmography A-Z ==
- Bagshawe Resurgence: A Source of Potential
- Darfar Ridge Cave: A Conservation Project
- Ecton Stone Quarry Mine
- Fight For Life: The Neil Moss Story
- Goodluck Mine: A Living Legacy
- A Guided Tour of Temple Mine
- Hidden Hydraulics: Sir Francis Level
- Mow Cop: Tunnels and Tramways
- Mud & Water
- Overton Mine: A Mine and its Miners
- Tearsall Pipe Caverns
- The High Rake Lead Mine Dig: Reclaiming a Legacy
- The Hollow Hill: The Story of the Ecton Mines
- To Titan From The Top
- Underground Journey
- When Streams Run Dry: P8 in Drought
- White River Series: A Conservation Audit
- Wild Majorca (Sun, Sea and Stalagmites / Torrente De Pareis)
