= Neil Moss =

Neil Moss may refer to:

- Neil Moss (caver), victim of a famous caving accident in Derbyshire, England
- Neil Moss (footballer), footballer for AFC Bournemouth
