= Peak & Northern Footpaths Society =

Charity protecting footpaths in England

- Abbreviation: PNFS
- Predecessor: The Manchester Association for the Preservation of Ancient Public Footpaths
- Formation: 1894
- Type: Charitable organisation
- Registration no.: Registered charity number: 212219
- Headquarters: Taylor House, 23 Turncroft Lane, Offerton, Stockport SK1 4AB
- Region served: North Midlands and North West of England
- Members: 1,250 (end of 2020)
- President: Position vacant
- Chair: Kathy Mclean
- Volunteers: over 150
- Website: Official website

The Peak & Northern Footpaths Society (PNFS) is a UK registered charity which was formed in 1894. The purpose of PNFS is to monitor, protect, and improve the footpath network of the North Midlands and North West of England, including the Peak District National Park. The organisation is the oldest existing regional footpath society in the England.

The Peak District & Northern Counties Footpaths Preservation Society was established on 16 August 1894 in the Young Men's Christian Association Hall, Peter Street, Manchester (now St George's House). It had evolved from The Manchester Association for the Preservation of Ancient Public Footpaths, which was founded in 1826.

PNFS has over 150 volunteer footpath inspectors who are assigned to parishes across the counties of Cheshire, Derbyshire, Greater Manchester, Lancashire, Merseyside, Staffordshire, South Yorkshire and West Yorkshire. They walk along their parishes' footpaths periodically to check for any problems, which they report to the local authority responsible for the footpaths concerned. PNFS often helps the authorities to fix problems promptly. Local authorities in the region are legally obliged to notify PNFS of any proposals affecting rights of way, in order that PNFS can uphold the interests of walkers.

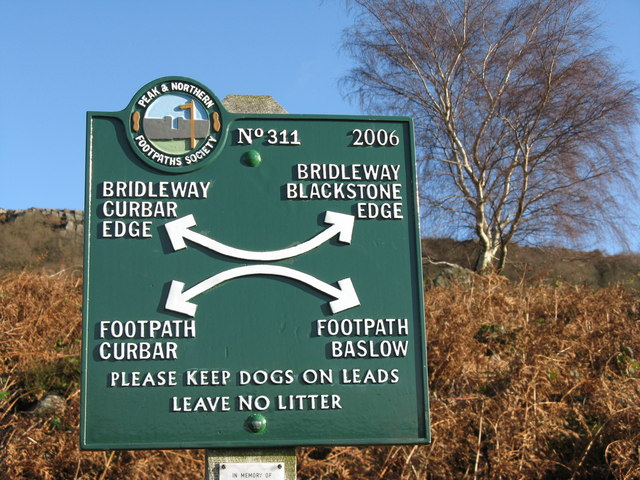
PNFS signpost near Baslow in Derbyshire

The charity has installed over 600 numbered signposts and built dozens of footbridges as part of its ongoing programme to improve walking routes in the region. The first cast iron signposts were erected in 1905 and 20 are still standing from before World War I.

PNFS publishes a quarterly magazine called Signpost.

The Irregulars group of the Long Distance Walkers Association (LDWA) organises a programme of weekly walks and in 2019 it became affiliated to PNFS.

In 1994, the UK Parliament passed a motion congratulating PNFS on its centenary for its work over 100 years, improving access to the countryside.
