= Peak Cavern =

Show cave in Derbyshire, England

Coordinates: 53.340256°N 1.778499°W

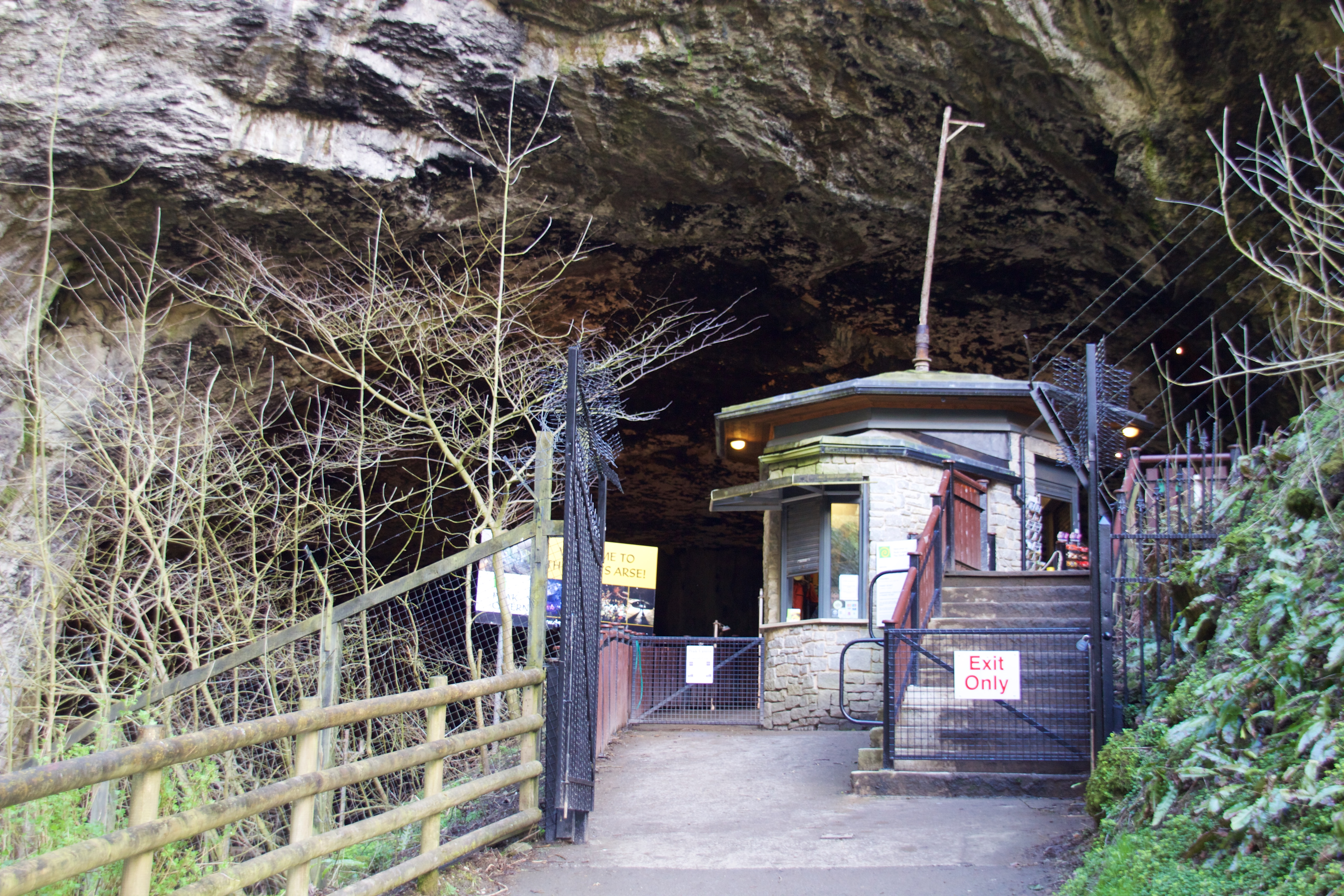
- Peak Cavern entrance
- Interactive map of Peak Cavern
- Location: Castleton, Derbyshire, UK
- Geology: Limestone

Peak Cavern, also known as the Devil's Arse, is one of the four show caves in Castleton, Derbyshire, England. Peakshole Water flows through and out of the cave, which has the largest natural cave entrance in Britain.

== Overview ==
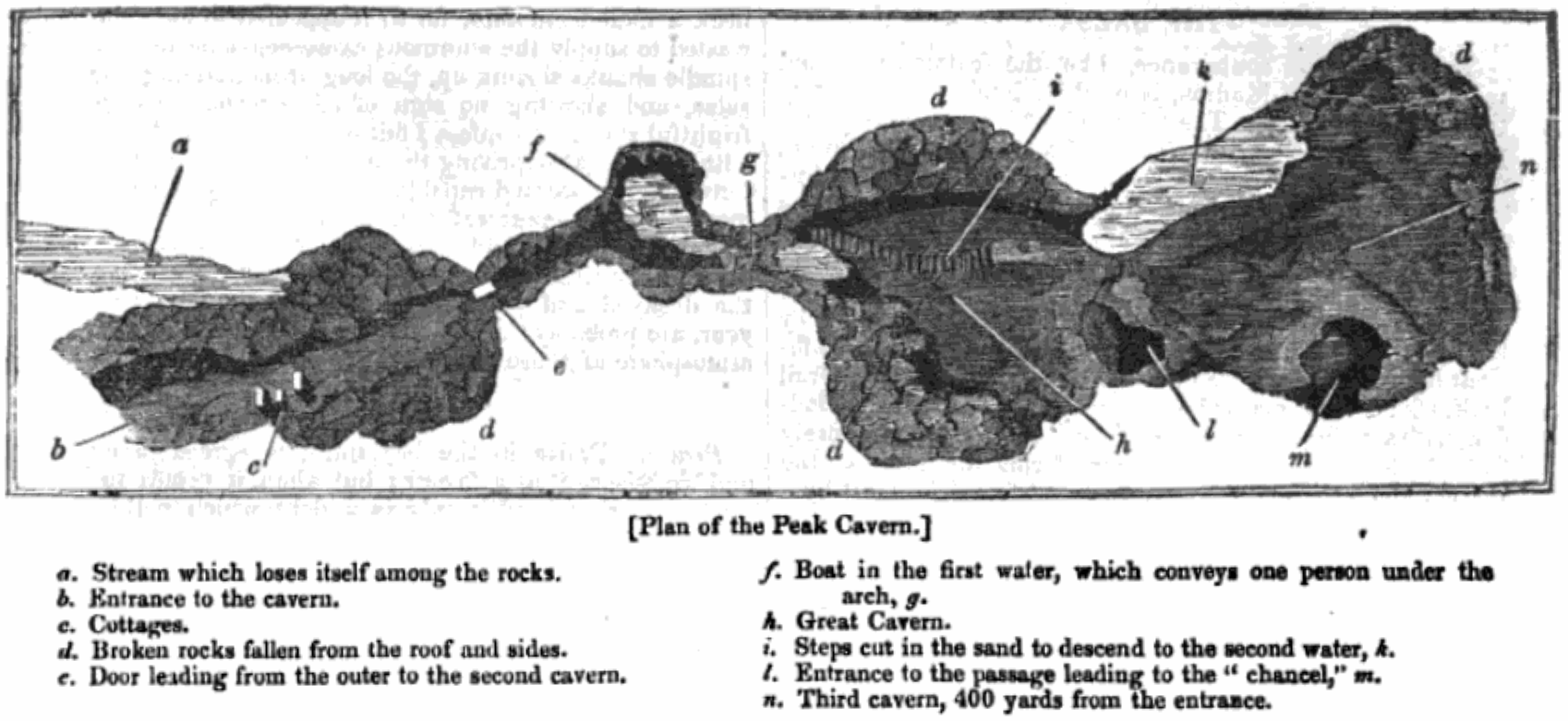
A plan of the Peak Cavern from 1834

Unlike the other show caves in the area, Peak Cavern is almost entirely natural; the only artificial part of the cave was blasted to bypass a low tunnel that was only accessible by lying down on a boat. The cave system is the largest in the Peak District, and the main entrance is the largest cave entrance in Britain. Until 1915, the cave was home to some of Britain's last (Note: The cave-houses at Kinver Edge near Kidderminster were populated until the 1950s.) troglodytes, who lived in houses built inside the cave mouth and made a living from rope making, while the depths of the cave were known as a haven for bandits. In legend, it was where thieves' cant was created by a meeting between Cock Lorel, leader of the rogues, and Giles Hather, the King of the Gypsies.

Several passages lead from the entrance, known as "The Vestibule". The only one open to the public is "Lumbago Walk", named as traversing it requires most adults to stoop. The route continues through two main caverns, "The Great Cave" and "Roger Rain's House", and into a passage, "Pluto's Dining Room" – This is now the furthest point currently open to the public, but before 1990 the show cave extended almost twice its current length; down "The Devil's Staircase" to "Halfway House" along a raised bank path which crossed an underground stream known as "Inner Styx" via a series of four wooden bridges, under "Five Arches" to the junction of Buxton Water Sump. This section often floods in winter, and occasionally summer, which required regular clearing of debris and mending of the safety fences at the start of the tourist season in April (cave tours were not an all-year event until 1997). In the mid-1980s, there was a worldwide scare over the possible dangers of radon, a gas found to be present in this lower part of the cave and a potential issue for tour guides frequently exposed to it. This, along with the maintenance required, led to the Five Arches part of the tour being closed to the public in 1989, the same year that the BBC filmed The Chronicles of Narnia at this location. It can, however, still be accessed by cavers, and a ventilation system here expels cave air to surface at Cave Dale. There have since been efforts to return this area of cave to a more natural state by removing features from its show-cave past, including the wooden bridges which had served generations of paying visitors.

From Five Arches, several routes are open to cavers. The main path, to the right, leads beneath "Victoria Aven", a sizeable natural shaft approximately 100 metres (300 ft) high, and on to "Far Sump", through which lies the Far Sump Extension. This area was first explored in 1980, but difficult access limited discoveries until routes through from Speedwell Cavern and James Hall's Over Engine Mine were opened in 1996. This permitted further exploration, and in 1999 Titan Shaft was discovered, at 141.5 metres (464 ft) the deepest pitch in Britain.

== Name ==
Historically the cave was known as the Devil's Arse, under which name it is described in William Camden's Britannia of 1586:

...there is a cave or hole within the ground called, saving your reverence, The Devils Arse, that gapeth with a wide mouth and hath in it many turnings and retyring roomes, wherein, for sooth, Gervase of Tilbury, whether for want of knowing the truth, or upon a delight hee had in fabling, hath written that a Shepheard saw a verie wide and large Country with riverets and brookes running here and there through it, and huge pooles of dead and standing waters. Notwithstanding, by reason of these and such like fables, this Hole is reckoned for one of the wonders of England...

The cavern was declared to be one of the Seven Wonders of the Peak by philosopher Thomas Hobbes in his 1636 book De Mirabilibus Pecci: Being The Wonders of the Peak in Darby-shire, Commonly called The Devil's Arse of Peak.

Daniel Defoe uses the same name in his A tour thro' the whole island of Great Britain (1724–26):

...the so famed wonder call'd, saving our good manners, The Devil's A—e in the Peak'.

and also mentions the shepherd story recorded by Gervase of Tilbury.

The name of the cave was thought to have been changed to "Peak Cavern" in order not to cause offence to Queen Victoria during an 1842 visit, but the Queen herself later asserted that she had never visited the cavern. More recently the cave has been promoted using its older, more vulgar name. The name may have arisen because of the flatulent-sounding noises from inside the cave when flood water is draining away.

== Events ==
The cavern has hosted concerts by Jarvis Cocker, Richard Hawley and The Vaccines. In 2013 the operators began promoting more concerts and events as a way to secure new streams of income. It was transformed into a cinema during Sheffield Doc/Fest in 2013 for a screening of The Summit attended by 500 people. The success of this event led to screenings every night during Doc/Fest 2014, including Happiness and Cave of Forgotten Dreams.

In May 2022, John Shuttleworth had to abandon a performance in the Peak Cavern, Derbyshire, due to fears of rocks falling down the cliff face. An operation by the Edale Mountain Rescue ensued to reach a walker who had fallen down the side of the cavern and was clinging to a tree above a 100 ft (30 m) drop.

== See also ==
- Neil Moss incident – Notable caving accident in Peak Cavern in 1959.
- The Devil's Point, Cairngorms, Scotland – also renamed to spare Queen Victoria embarrassment.
