= Titan (cave) =

Cave in Derbyshire, England

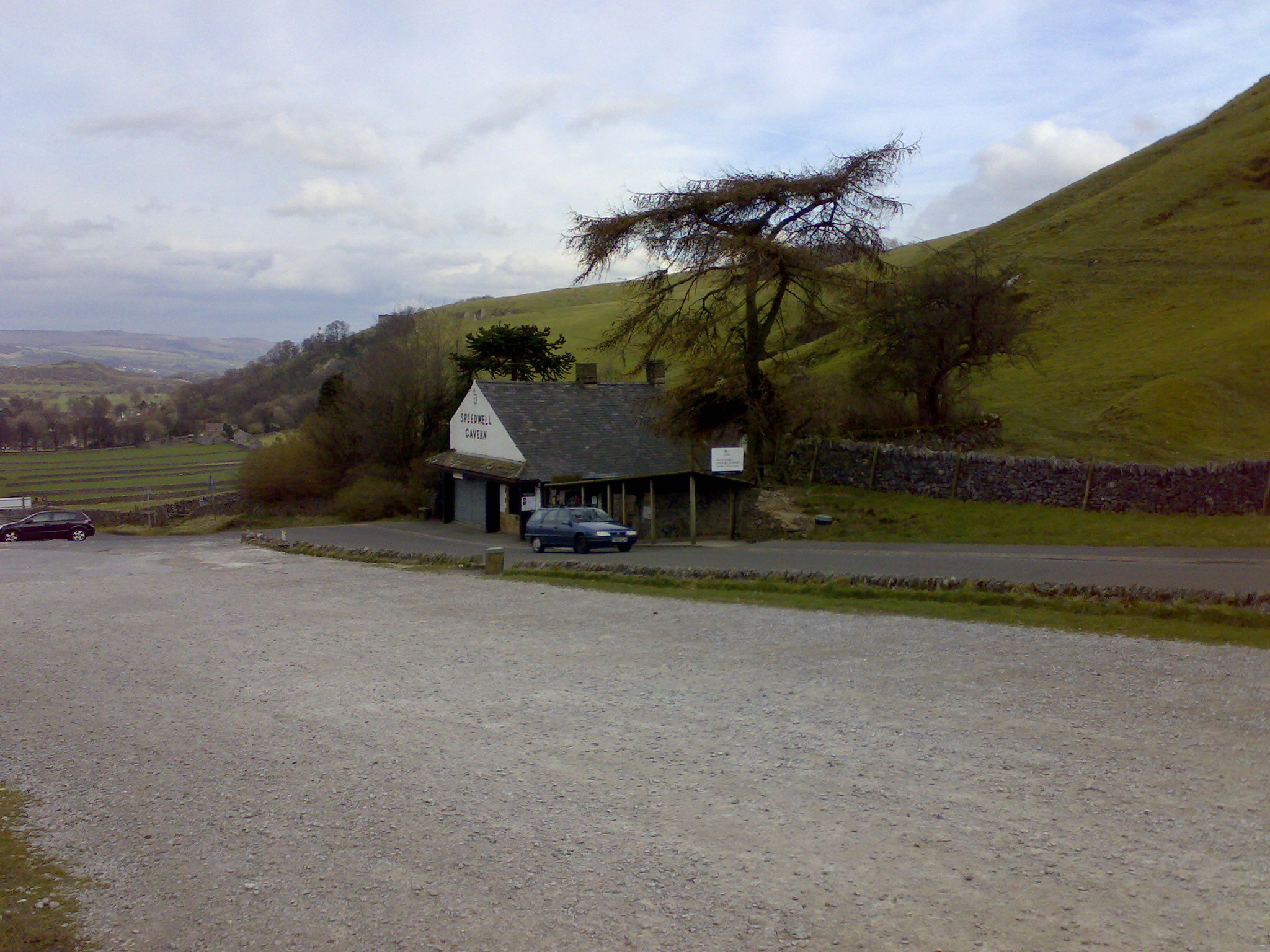
- Speedwell Cavern, which provided initial access to Titan
- Interactive map of Titan
- Location: Castleton, Derbyshire, England
- Coordinates: 53°20′0.09″N 1°47′35.85″W
- Depth: 141.5 metres (464 ft)
- Length: 17 kilometres (10.6 mi)
- Discovery: 1999

Titan is a natural cavern near Castleton in the Derbyshire Peak District, and is the deepest shaft of any known cave in Britain, at 141.5 metres (464 ft). The existence of Titan was revealed in November 2006, following its discovery on 1 January 1999 after cavers discovered connections from the James Hall Over Engine Mine to both Speedwell Cavern and Peak Cavern. Previously, the deepest known underground shaft in Britain had been Gaping Gill on the slopes of Ingleborough in the Yorkshire Dales.

A group of Peak District cavers led by Dave Nixon (nicknamed "Moose") discovered the shaft after finding an account by an 18th-century academic, James Plumtree, in a university library. Initial explorations in the James Hall Over Engine Mine led to the discovery of a large shaft named Leviathan, before further excavations revealed the existence of Titan.

== History ==
In 1793, Plumtree wrote a paper describing a network of passages and shafts that went beyond the well-known Speedwell Cave/Mine system near Castleton. His account took him down the Speedwell Canal and deep into the cave system, but his journal described mined passages (worked mostly in darkness) that went far beyond what had then been explored. The Plumtree account specifically mentions a way out to the surface some 230 metres (750 ft) above "by way of another man's mine".

Surveying showed that one of many shafts on the surface on the mineral rake in which Speedwell's mined passages are formed was the shaft of James Hall's Over Engine Mine (JH). The Hall family were one of the many families of Castleton engaged in lead mining, farming, and inn-keeping—often simultaneously—and the family were often licensees of the George Hotel. At the foot of the shaft the "cartgate" level (where the lead ore was carted to the haulage shaft) was found to have no fewer than seven blockages, which took as many years to clear. Miners' initials marked on the walls of Speedwell Cavern, Peak Cavern and JH confirmed this was one way at least that early miners ("t'owd man" in caving parlance) reached Speedwell Cavern from the surface far above.

== Discovery ==
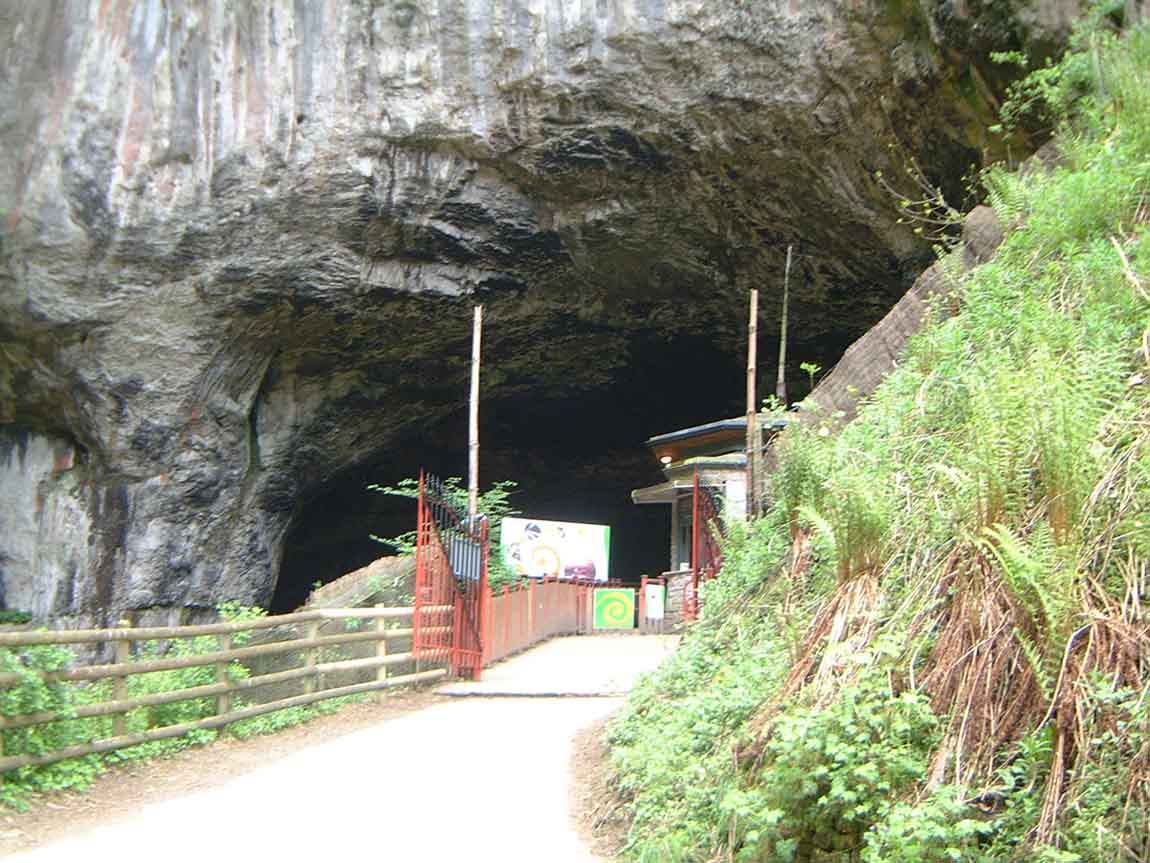
Peak Cavern, which also provides access to Titan

Eventually a miners' workplace was discovered, leading to Leviathan—a huge natural shaft altered by mining operations, 260 feet (79 m) deep in total. Many relics from the mining operations were discovered there still in situ as the miners left them.

The team spent three years removing another huge fall of boulders before finally gaining entry to Speedwell Cavern at the Boulder Piles. Another huge blockage at the foot of Leviathan was excavated in an operation requiring the building of a railway, and eventually the dig led into the Far Sump extension of Peak Cavern. This section of cave was previously only accessible either by diving Peak Cavern's Far Sump or via Speedwell Cavern with very difficult caving.

Moose and his team later went to this area of Peak Cavern via JH and arrived at the underside of an enormous boulder choke just a few metres from the upstream end of Far Sump. The group subsequently discovered a way up through the massive boulder pile and arrived at the foot of Titan. The echoes from their shouts and noise from the waterfall indicated a huge shaft, but their lamps showed what appeared to be the top about 60 metres (200 ft) above them—The Event Horizon.

This proved to be only a narrowing to a large ledge and the shaft continued soaring upwards into the darkness. A six-day climb led to the domed roof with no way on, but a passage from the west some 20 metres (66 ft) further down is believed to be the source of the stream that helped to form this massive cavern.

Blocked by a huge hanging boulder choke, the West Passage could not be explored as the choke was too dangerous to enter in its exposed position—circa 120 metres (390 ft) above the floor. A 46-metre (151 ft)-deep access shaft excavated from the surface took over four years to dig and now gives access to a bedding-plane passage entering the main shaft near the top of Titan. Digging continues in an attempt to extend the system in other directions. The total length of the cave system exceeds 11 miles (18 km).

The cave is located near Castleton, Derbyshire, at 53°20′0.09″N 1°47′35.85″W (or grid reference SK1386281847).
