= Pecsaetan =

Anglo-Saxon tribe

- c. AD 6th century – AD 8th century
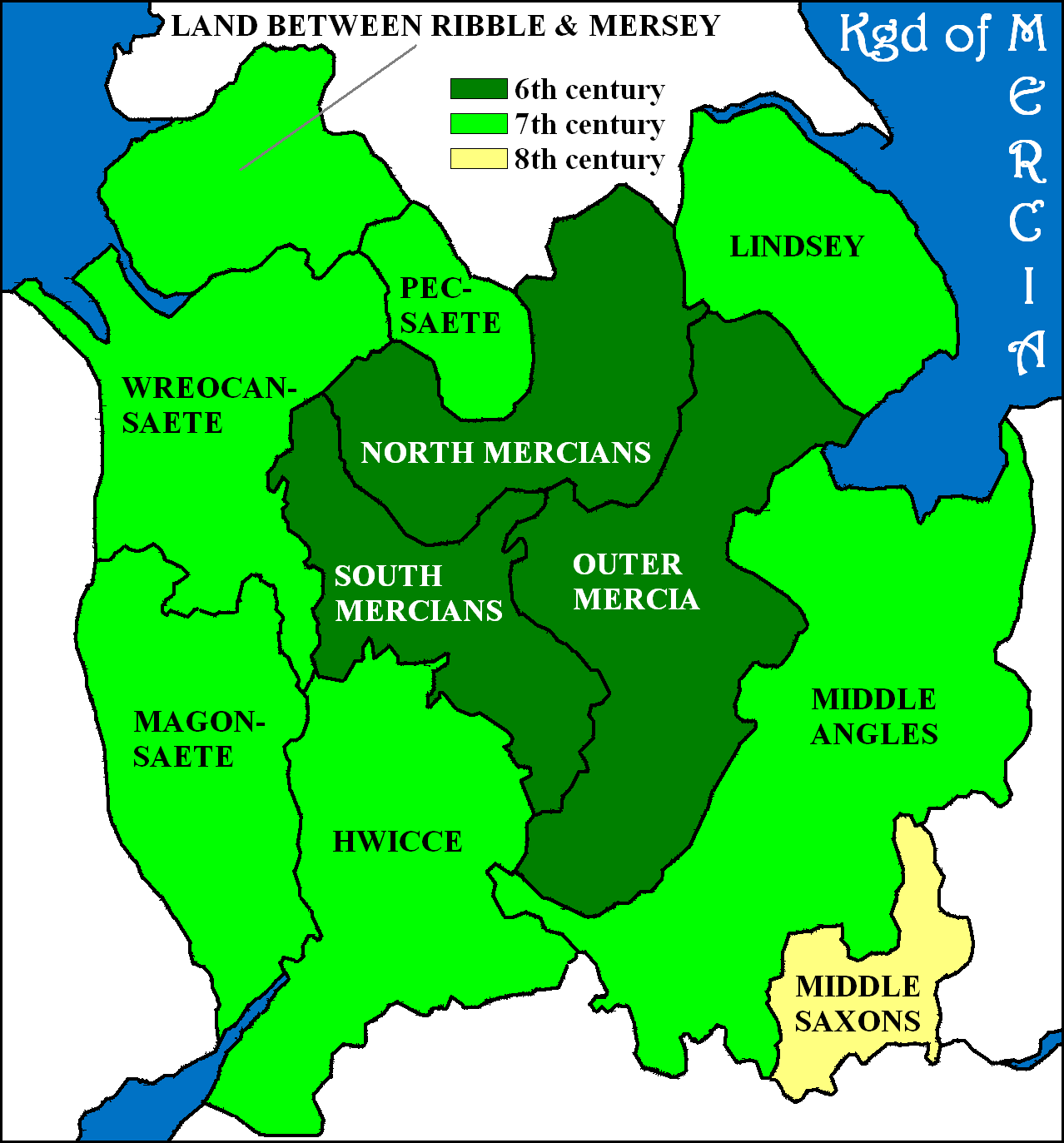
- Pecsaetan lands in the 7th to 9th Century
- Religion: Anglo-Saxon paganism, Anglo-Saxon Christianity
- Historical era: Anglo-Saxon
  - Establishment: c. AD 6th century
  - Conquest by Mercia: c. AD 8th century
Succeeded by
Mercia
- Today part of: United Kingdom

The Pecsætan (Old English: Pēcsǣtan; singular Pēcsǣta, literally "Peak-dweller"), also called Peaklanders or Peakrills in modern English, were an Anglo-Saxon tribe who inhabited the central and northern parts of the Peak District area of England.

The area was in the southern part of the Brigantia, a Brythonic tribal domain. Early Anglo-Saxon settlements were by West Angles. This tribe advanced up the valleys of the rivers Derwent and Dove during their northern conquests in the 6th century. The area became known locally as the Pecsætan, Peak-set or land of the Peak peoples. Later their territory formed the northern division of Mercia, and in 848 the Mercian Witenagemot assembled at Repton.

In A tour thro' the whole island of Great Britain, Daniel Defoe mentions a later group of people called The Peakrills writing, "The Peakrills, as they are called, are a rude boorish kind of People; but bold, daring, and even desperate in their Search into the Bowels of the Earth: for which Reason they are often employed by our Engineers in the Wars to carry on the Sap, when they lay Siege to strong fortified Places."

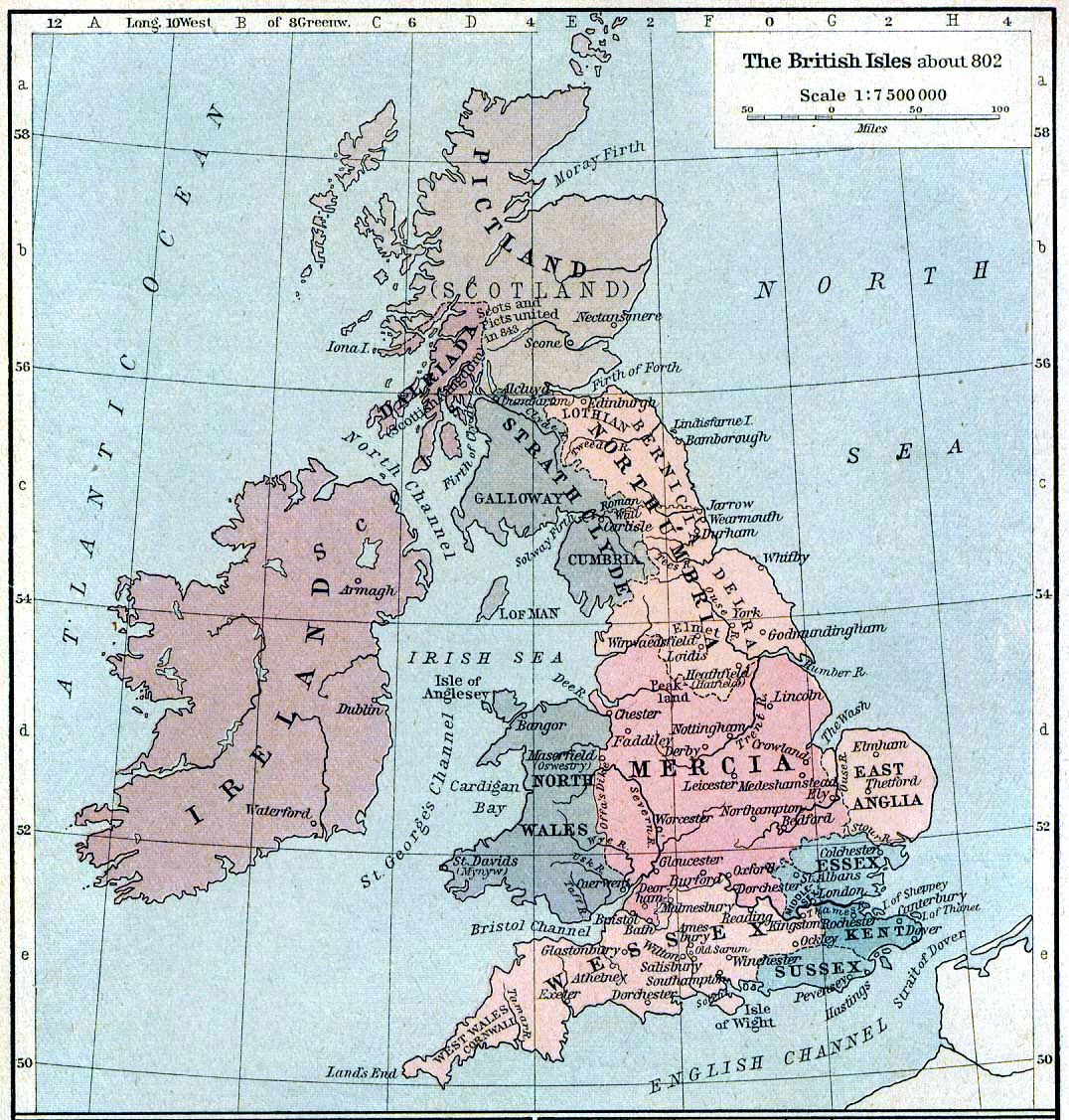
"Peak-land" depicted as part of northern Mercia in around 802AD
