= Neil Moss incident =

1959 caving death in Derbyshire, England

Neil Moss
- Born: 28 July 1938
- Died: 24 March 1959 (aged 20); Peak Cavern, Derbyshire, England
- Cause of death: Hypercapnia
- Burial place: Moss Chamber, Peak Cavern
- Education: Balliol College, Oxford University

Oscar Hackett Neil Moss (28 July 1938 – 24 March 1959) was a British student who died in a caving accident. A twenty-year-old undergraduate studying philosophy at Balliol College, Oxford, Moss became jammed underground, 1,000 feet (300 m) from the entrance, after descending a narrow unexplored shaft in Peak Cavern, a famous cave system in Castleton in Derbyshire, on 22 March 1959.

== Incident ==
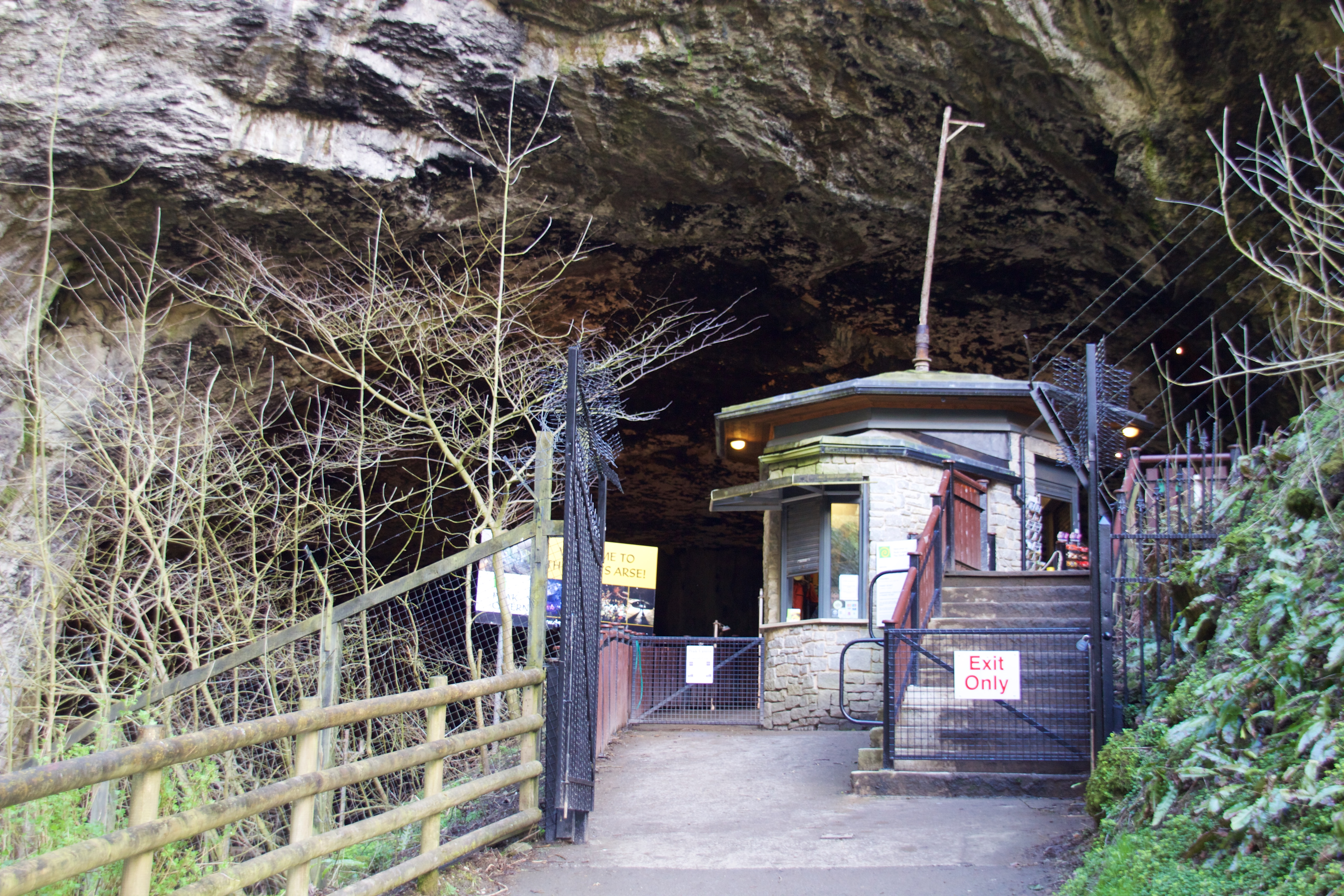
Entrance to Peak Cavern in 2015

According to accounts from Moss's party, he became stuck after dislodging a boulder in part of the shaft, estimated to be 40 feet (12 m) deep, anchoring the bottom of his rope ladder and preventing him being pulled up by rescuers. Moss, who was 6 feet (180 cm) tall, was unable to maneuver his arms in the narrow shaft to climb up himself.

Initial attempts to haul him free failed because the rope broke several times. When he lost consciousness as carbon dioxide from his own respiration as well as from his carbide lamp built up in the base of the shaft, he was unable to assist further rescue attempts made with a stronger rope. More rescue efforts were made after Moss's party sought help from experienced cavers who notified the police. Oxygen cylinders were brought into the cave to try to ventilate the shaft using a rubber tube but made little difference to the poisonous atmosphere inside. Meanwhile, a media circus assembled in Castleton, keen to report on the incident.

On the second day, eighteen-year-old June Bailey answered the call for an experienced caver small enough to fit into the tunnel, and allegedly spent six hours assisting, until she was "driven back by foul air." This cannot be substantiated although Dave Webb is doubtless she did enter the cave. Caving veteran Bob Leakey, who heard the appeal from the police via a BBC radio news bulletin, also tried but could not get to Moss. The rescuers abandoned attempts to reach Moss down the shaft and tried drilling through the rock to reach him from underneath. Moss never regained consciousness and was declared dead on the morning of Tuesday 24 March by Doctor Hugh Kidd after his breathing could no longer be heard after detecting Cheyne–Stokes respiration beforehand during pauses in the drilling. Dr Kidd recalled this as the first time he had pronounced a death without being able to see the patient.

His father, who had kept vigil at the entrance, requested that his son's body be left in place to avoid risk of further injury or loss of life to those attempting a retrieval. The fissure was sealed with loose rocks from the floor of the chamber and the inscription 1959 Niel Moss RIP (name misspelled) was carved onto a rock by the shaft. This section of Peak Cavern is now known as Moss Chamber after being renamed from Great Cascade Chamber in honour of the deceased. There were media reports of the fissure being filled with cement or concrete but this is untrue, as verified by those who participated in the rescue and clear-up.

== Aftermath ==
The story of Moss's death was widely publicised, including in European, Australian, and American newspapers. The cave remained closed to the public until after the inquest with the lights remaining lit as a sign of respect. The publicity included accusations of fault although the coroner reached a verdict of death by misadventure with no fault on the part of Moss's original party or the rescuers. The incident led to a brief negative attitude towards caving with some calling for it to be banned although it did raise awareness of foul air in tight dead end crevices.

The incident also featured in the novel One Last Breath (2004) by Stephen Booth. Robert MacFarlane dedicated four pages to the story in his book "Underland". In 2006 fellow Derbyshire caver Dave Webb released a documentary Fight For Life – The Neil Moss Story on DVD after researching the incident since 1991, including interviews with rescuers and a member of Moss's party, in response to contradictory news coverage of the event. The documentary was released with an added introduction on Webb's official YouTube channel on 31 May 2025. An account of the unsuccessful rescue effort is given in "Entombed" by David Ward (2025).

== See also ==
- Caving in the United Kingdom
- List of UK caving fatalities
- Nutty Putty Cave, Utah – site of similar incident in 2009.
