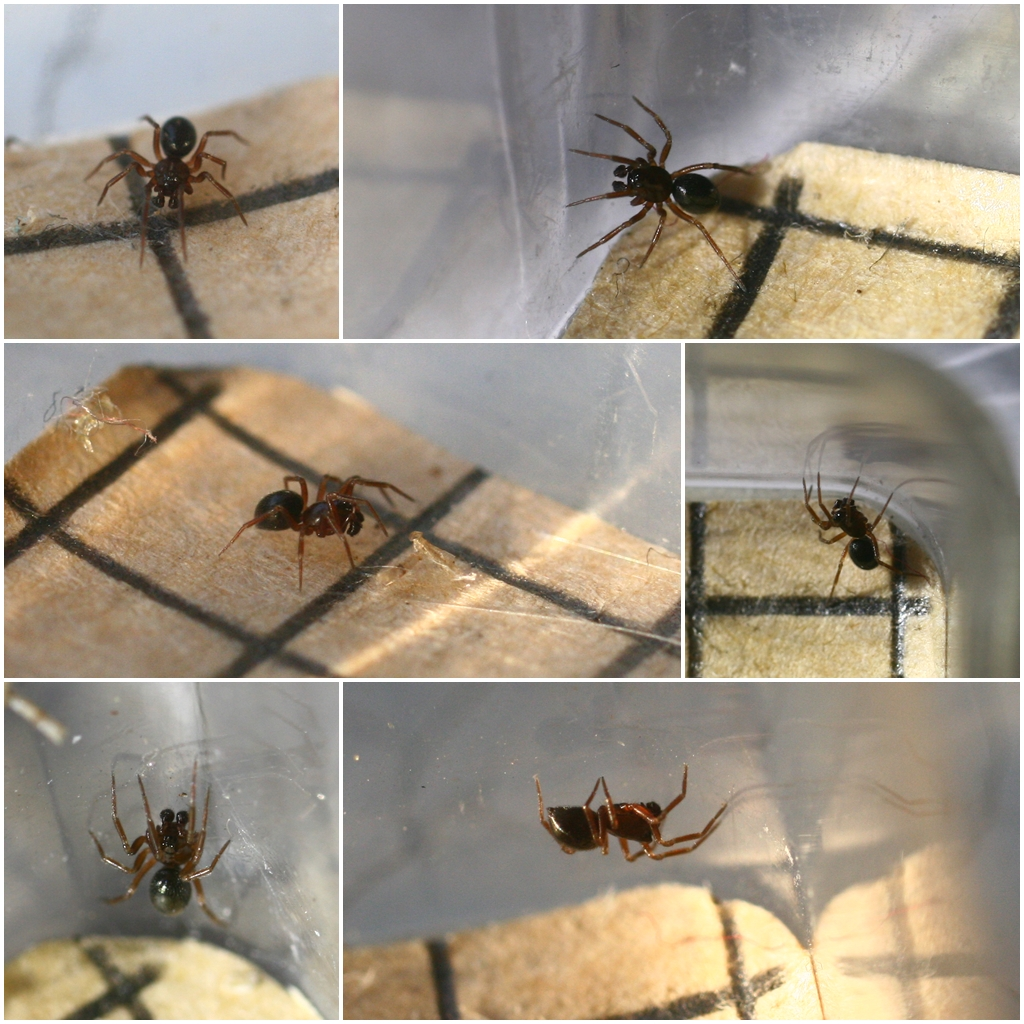
- Monocephalus cf. fuscipes

Scientific classification
- Kingdom: Animalia
- Phylum: Arthropoda
- Subphylum: Chelicerata
- Class: Arachnida
- Order: Araneae
- Infraorder: Araneomorphae
- Family: Linyphiidae
- Genus: Monocephalus; Smith, 1906

Type species
- M. fuscipes (Blackwall, 1836)

Species
- 2, see text

= Monocephalus =

Genus of spiders

Monocephalus is a genus of dwarf spiders that was first described by F. P. Smith in 1906.

== Species ==
As of May 2019 it contains two species:

- Monocephalus castaneipes (Simon, 1884) – Europe
- Monocephalus fuscipes (Blackwall, 1836) (type) – Europe
