= Speedwell Cavern =

Show cave in Derbyshire, England

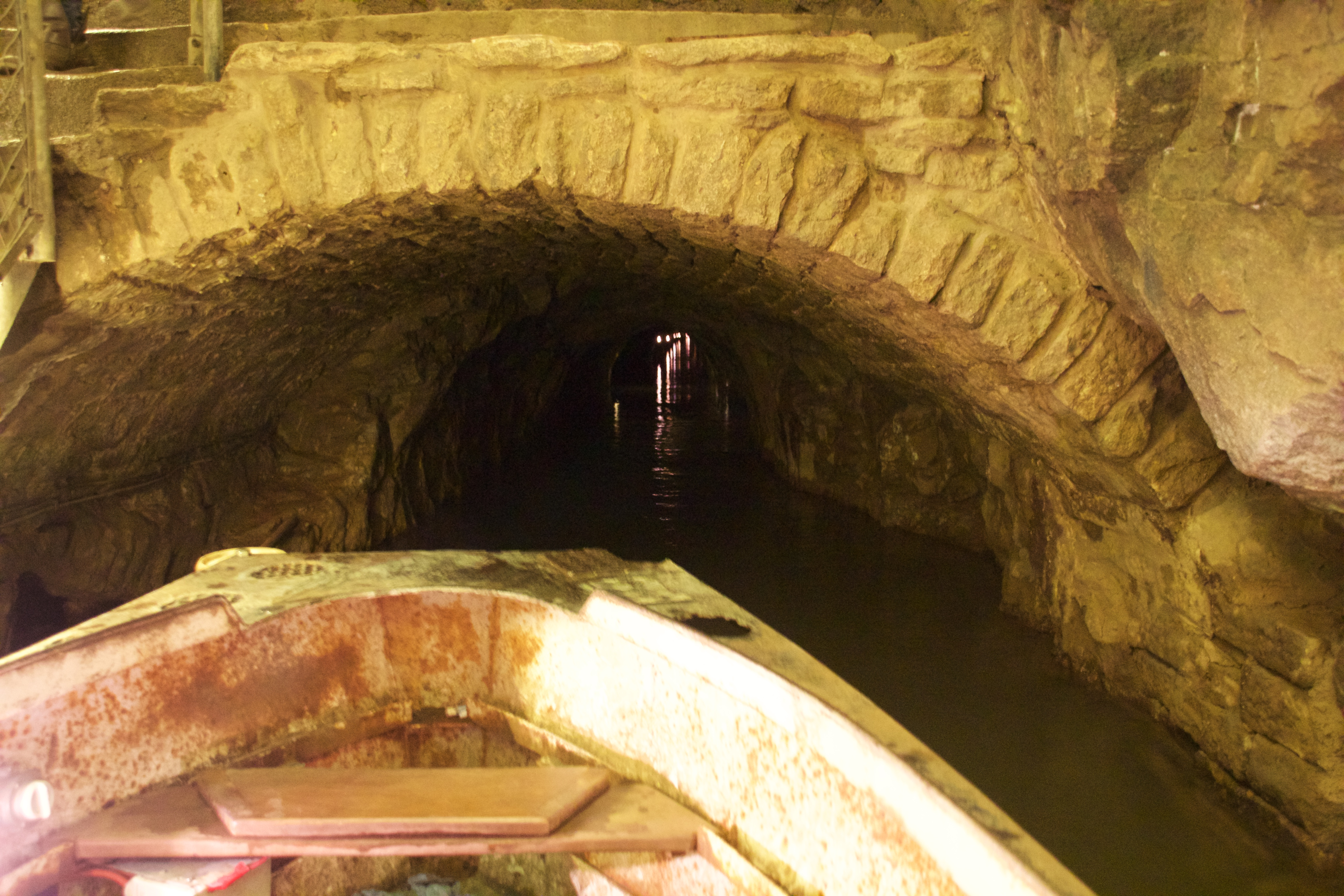
- Interactive map of Speedwell Cavern
- Location: Castleton, Derbyshire, England
- Coordinates: 53.3414°N 1.7921°W
- Geology: Limestone
- Website: Official website

Location of Speedwell Cavern, Derbyshire, and the other nearby caves.

Speedwell Cavern is one of the four show caves in Castleton, Derbyshire, England.

The cave system consists of a horizontal lead-miners' adit (a level passageway driven horizontally into the hillside) 200 metres (660 ft) below ground leading to the cavern itself, a limestone cave. The narrow adit is permanently flooded, so after descending a long staircase, access to the cave is made by boat. At the end of the adit, the cavern opens up with fluorspar veins, stalactites and stalagmites, and the so-called "Bottomless Pit". This chamber has an underground lake with a 20-metre-high (66 ft) waterfall and an extremely deep vertical shaft, now choked to within 20 metres (66 ft) of the surface by rock spoil dumped by miners, after driving the continuation of the canal to the natural streamway beyond, which provided the bulk of the water for the canal. The original depth of the shaft has been estimated, from the amount of spoil placed in the shaft over the years, at around 150 metres (490 ft).

The mine was developed in the 1770s but the limited lead ore deposits meant that it was not profitable and it was closed down by 1790.

At the foot of Winnats Pass, it is a tourist attraction with an underground boat trip to the cavern. Originally, the guide propelled the boat by pushing against the walls with his hands; later, the boat was legged through, and now it is powered by an electric motor.

A connection was discovered in 2006 between the Speedwell Cavern system and Titan, the largest natural shaft in the UK, which is 141.5 metres (464 ft) high.
