= Blue John =

Blue John or Bluejohn may refer to:

- Blue John, Kentucky, United States
- Blue John (mineral), a form of fluorite mined in Derbyshire, England
- Blue John Cavern, a cavern in Castleton, Derbyshire where fluorite is mined
- Bluejohn Canyon, a canyon in Utah, United States, site of the Aron Ralston accident
- Blue John (album), an album by organist John Patton
- Lance-Constable Bluejohn, a character in the Discworld series, a member of Ankh-Morpork City Watch
- Blue John Gap, a fictional location in Arthur Conan Doyle's short story The Terror of Blue John Gap

== See also ==
- John Blue (disambiguation)
