= John Blue =

John or Johnny Blue may refer to:

- John Blue (ice hockey) (born 1966), American ice hockey player
- John Rinehart Blue (1905–1965), American politician, educator and merchant
- John S. Blue (1902–1942), US Naval officer
  - USS Blue (DD-744), US Navy ship named after John S. Blue
- Johnny Blue (song), Eurovision Song Contest entry for Germany
- Johnny Blue (album), 1981 Thorleifs album

== See also ==
- Blue John (disambiguation)
