= Treak Cliff Cavern =

Show cave in Derbyshire, England

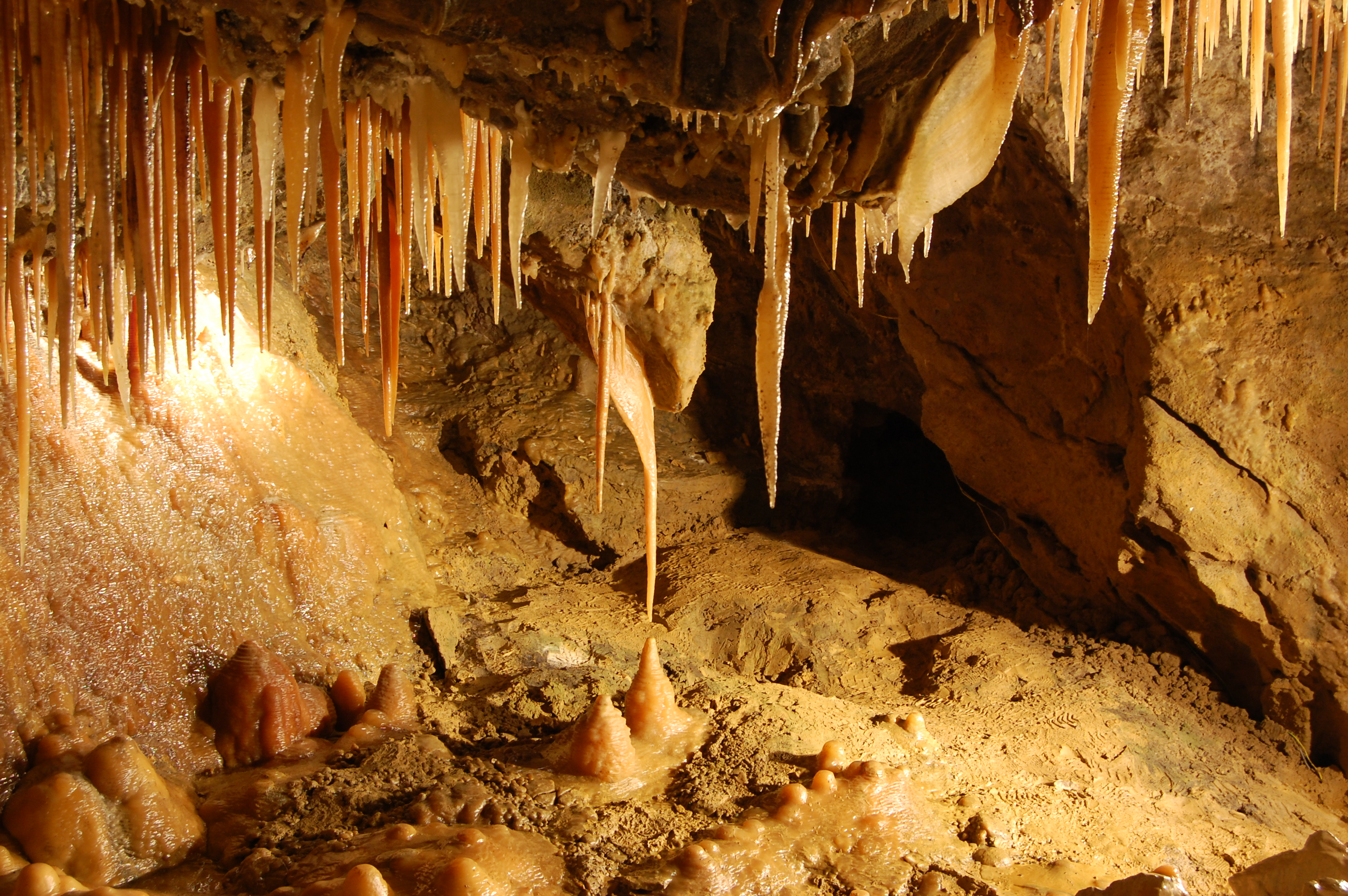
- The Ram's Head and the Stork, features of the Dream Cave chamber, part of the 'New Series'

- Location within Derbyshire
- Location: Castleton, Derbyshire, England
- OS grid: SK136831
- Coordinates: 53°20′42″N 1°47′50″W
- Length: 1,000 feet (300 m)
- Elevation: 950 feet (290 m)
- Discovery: 1745–50 (Old Series); 1926 (New Series); 2014 (New Series Extensions)
- Geology: Carboniferous limestone
- Entrances: 2
- Show cave opened: 1935
- Lighting: Electric
- Features: Blue John; helictites
- Cave survey: Trevor D. Ford, 1954
- Website: bluejohnstone.com

Treak Cliff Cavern is a show cave near Castleton in Derbyshire, England. It is part of the Castleton Site of Special Scientific Interest and one of only two sites where the ornamental mineral Blue John is still excavated (the other is the nearby Blue John Cavern). As part of an agreement with English Nature, the Blue John that can be seen in the show cave is not mined but it is extracted in small quantities from other areas of the cave and made into saleable items like bowls, jewellery, and ornaments.

The cave comprises three sections, the Old Series, discovered by lead miners in the 18th century, the New Series, discovered during blasting in the 1920s, and the New Series Extensions, discovered in 2014. Only the Old Series contains Blue John, but the New Series is well decorated with flowstone, stalagmites, and stalactites. The New Series Extensions are also highly decorated, but are only accessible by experienced cavers. Three human skeletons and flint implements from the Neolithic era were found in a small cave nearby in 1921.

== Geology ==
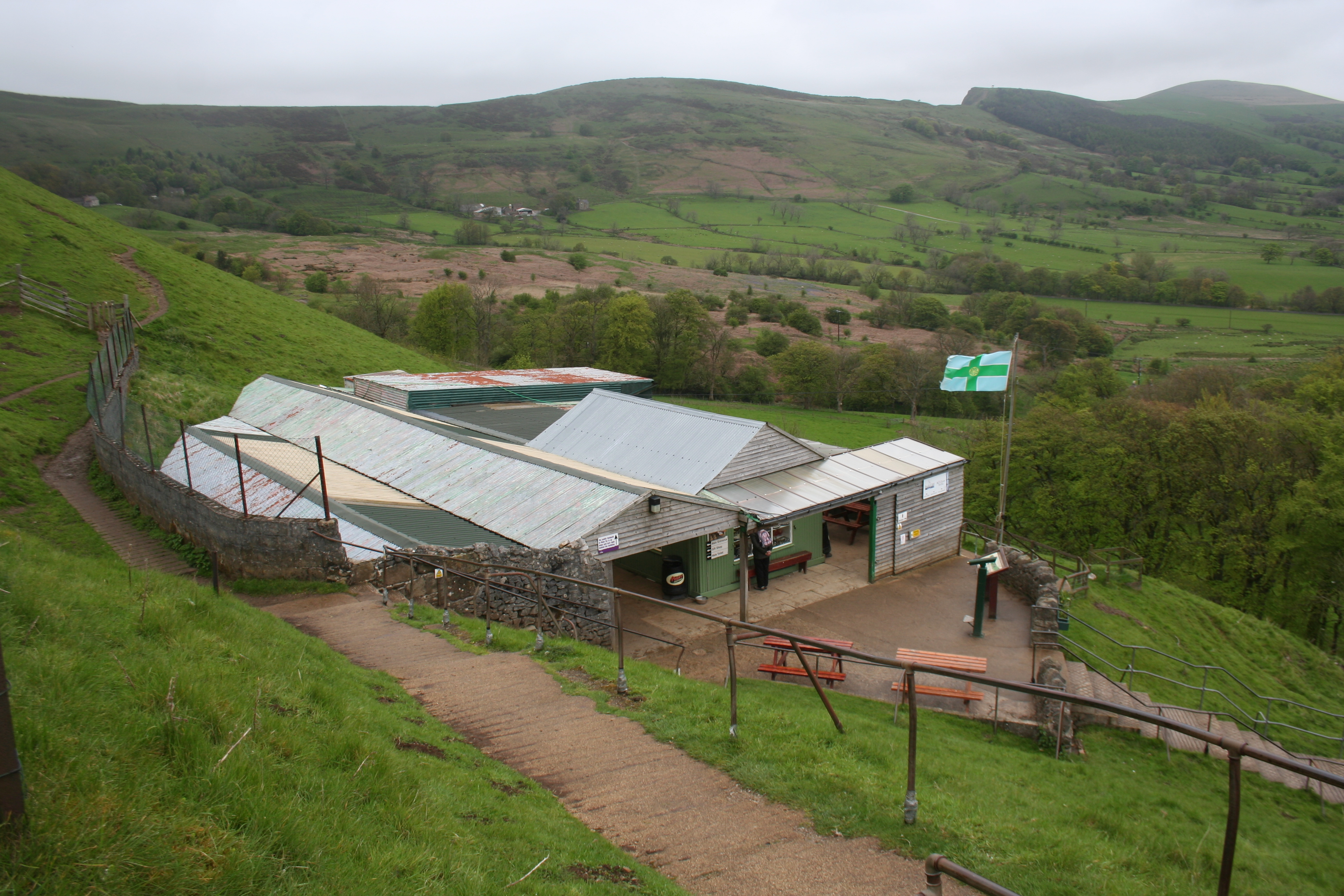
The visitor centre and office complex

Treak Cliff, the hill in which the cavern lies, is composed of Carboniferous Limestone; the steep eastern slope of the hill is thought to have been the edge of a reef on the margin of a tropical lagoon. This reef was then raised above sea level by an uplift in the Earth's crust and was subsequently eroded, forming a boulder bed on the slopes. This was subsequently overlain by deltaic river sediments, which formed the shale and Millstone Grit sandstones that still overlay the limestone to the north, and on top of those the coal measures formed, until the limestone was deep beneath the surface and subject to high temperature and pressure. Major earth movements at the end of the Carboniferous period reversed this subsidence, and the rock layers were raised to form an anticline, the top of which was eroded away. Surface streams, on meeting the limestone, percolated through cracks and weaknesses and started to dissolve the limestone to form caverns. The stream that formed the New Series once flowed into the lower end of Winnats Pass, whereas the stream that formed the Old Series lost its headwaters to the predecessor of the modern Odin Sitch as it cut down through soft shales. There is no modern stream in the Treak Cliff Cavern, but percolating water from the cave has been dye-tested and found to emerge at the Russet Well beside Peakshole Water near Peak Cavern in Castleton, taking 13 to 20 hours to travel the distance.

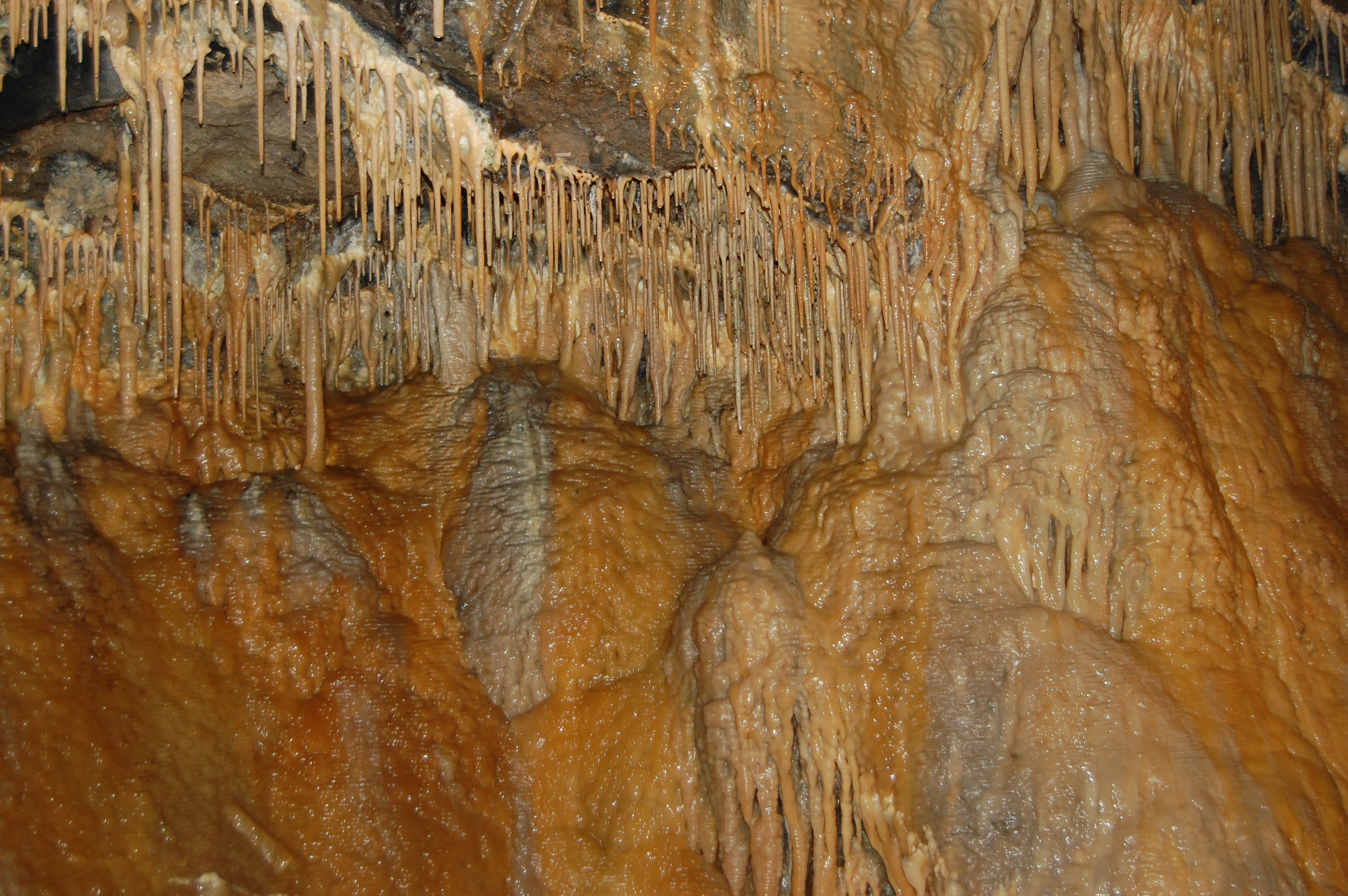
Stalactites and flowstone

Since their original formation, the caverns have been decorated by the formation of flowstone, stalagmites, and stalactites. Two stalagmite samples from the Aladdin's Cave section of the Treak Cliff Cavern have been found, by means of radioactive dating, to date back 111,000 years, proving that the cave itself is much older. The formations in Treak Cliff are stained orange or red by iron, white by lead, and occasionally green or blue by copper. Some of the stalactites have been distorted by variations in the flow to form twisted structures known as helictites.

Water dripping into the Cavern
rainwater filters into the cavern and is collected for drinking.

=== Blue John ===
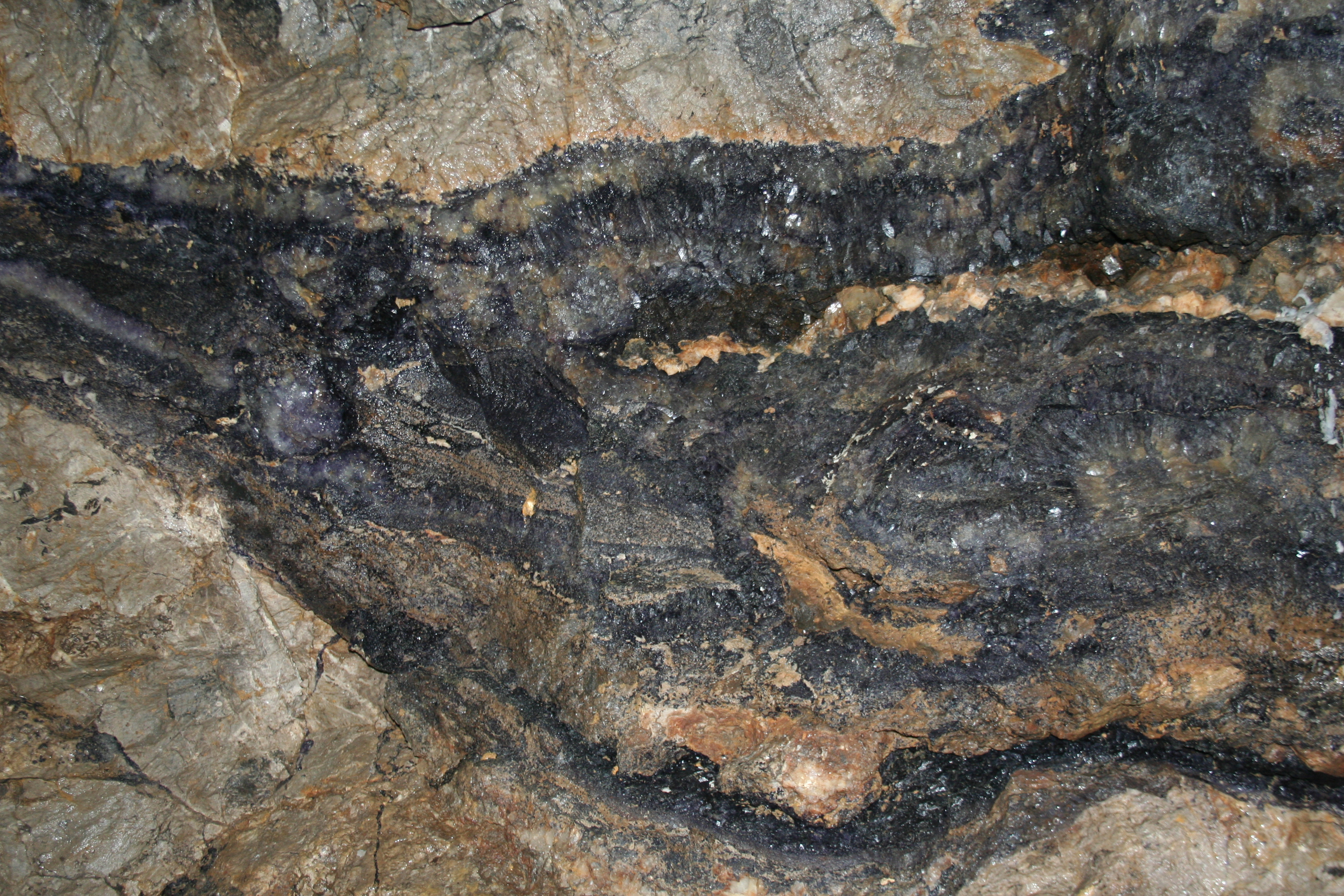
Exposed Blue John in situ within the Witch's Cave

Trace elements from buried sediments, percolating rainwater and trapped seawater meant inorganic ions were present within the porous rock, among them chlorine, fluorine, sulfate, calcium, barium, lead, zinc, and even uranium. Organic material from the decomposing bodies of marine animals in the sediments formed hydrocarbons, precursors of oil and gas. At high pressure, a hot mineralised fluid formed and was forced into fractures and other voids in the rock. From this fluid, catalysed by the hydrocarbons, compounds such as galena (lead sulfide, PbS), sphalerite (zinc sulfide, ZnS), baryte (barium sulfate, BaSO_{4}), and fluorspar (calcium fluoride, CaF_{2}) were precipitated as solid crystals. At Treak Cliff the mineralised fluid was particularly rich in fluorine and 99% of the deposited mineral is fluorspar (technically, fluorite is the pure crystal and fluorspar the industrial name for the impure substance as mined). The exploitable deposits of fluorspar are known as "rakes", "scrins", "flats", or "pipes" depending on the size and shape of the voids in which the crystals were deposited.

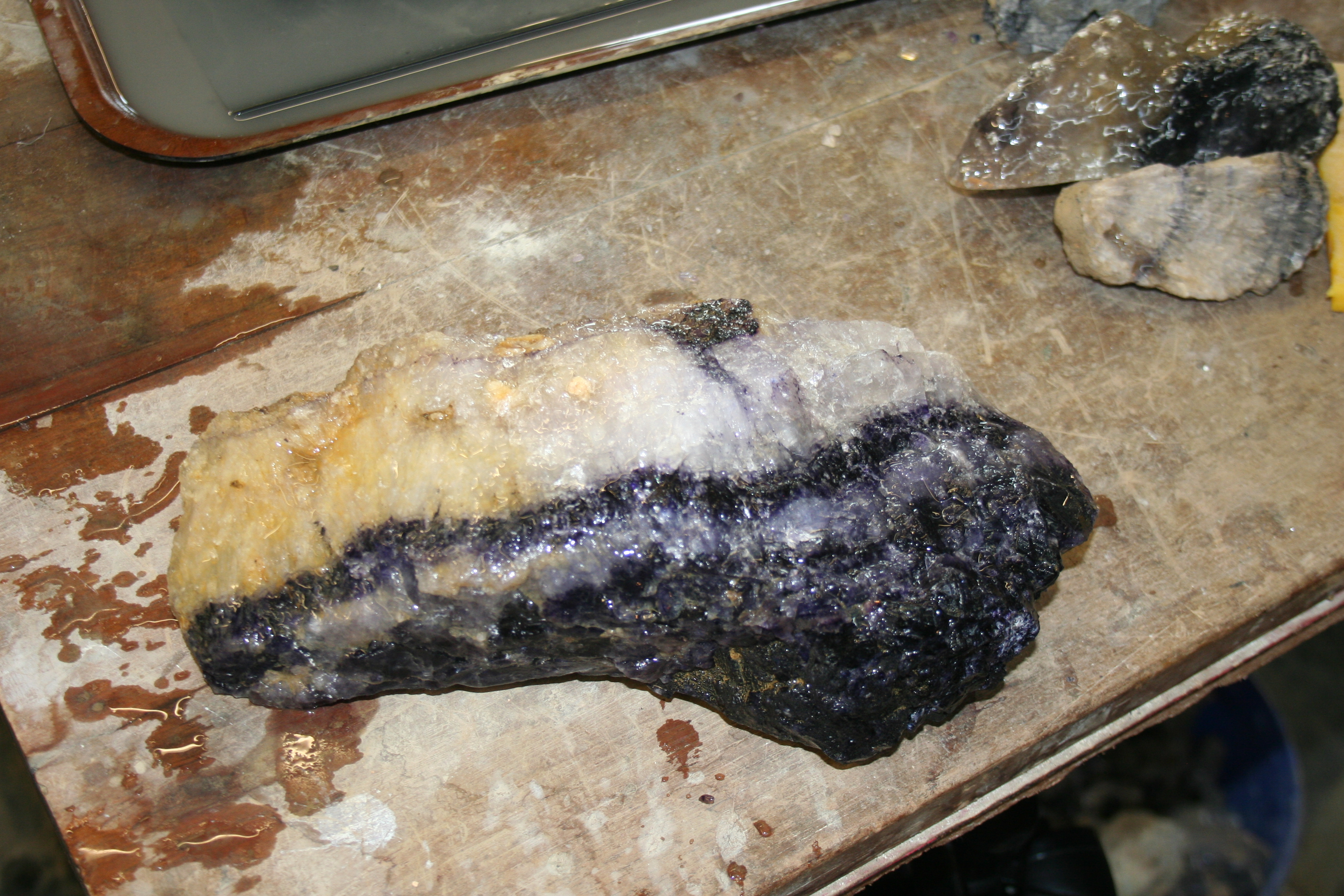
An excavated piece of Blue John

At Treak Cliff and nearby Blue John Cavern, the fluorspar is uniquely banded, ranging from blue-black to white. The exact cause of the coloration is disputed, but it seems that the formation of Blue John requires a rare combination of porous limestone containing a little hydrocarbon, small traces of radioactive elements, an impervious layer to prevent the mineral fluids and hydrocarbons from escaping, a high concentration of fluorine ions, and variations in conditions during the crystallization process to form the banded colours. The rarity of this combination of conditions explains the scarcity of Blue John.

Because of its attractive banding and its rarity, Blue John has commercial value and ornaments made from it are much sought after by collectors. Historically, as well as from Treak Cliff and Blue John Cavern, veins of the mineral were also worked from Old Tor Mine and another mine in Winnats Pass, and also from mines near Windy Knoll and Odin Mine, toward Mam Tor. Limited opencast extraction of Blue John took place on the top of Treak Cliff during World War II, and an incident of unofficial and illegal extraction from Old Tor Mine in the 1970s led to that mine being closed by order of H.M. Inspector of Mines, leaving Treak Cliff and Blue John Cavern as the two remaining sources of new stocks of the mineral. Both caves have a policy of supplying raw Blue John only to shops within Castleton, so the few outlets selling it elsewhere rely on old stocks.

== History ==
The Old Series is thought to have been discovered in about 1745–50 by miners seeking lead ore, and is known to have been a source of Blue John by the 1750s, at which time it was known as Millers Mine. Extraction continued throughout the 19th century, including some opencast working on the hilltop above. There is no historical evidence of the caves being shown to the public during this period, though the nearby Blue John Caverns were opened to the public in around 1800 and extended around 1843.

Writing in The Midland Naturalist in 1878, William Hunt Painter described a visit:

...we proceed to the Blue John Mine in Traycliff. This mine is the grand depository of the amethystine or topaziue fluor spor, locally called "Blue John," to distinguish it from "Black Jack," or zinc ore. This substance is composed of lime and fluoric acid, the most penetrative and corrosive of any acid known, the blue colouring matter being oxide of manganese. Descending by a flight of steps, a narrow confined passage is reached, that winds between the rocks. From the roof of this passage stalactites are pendant, whilst in the sides crystals of carbonate of lime glisten. After descending for a short time, the variegated cavern is reached—a large chamber, said to be upwards of 100 feet in height. But this is not the only large chamber that has been discovered through the labours of the miners. Some distance from this cavern is the one called "Lord Mulgrave's Dining Room"—a large cavity about 150 feet in height, and 60 feet in diameter. But the most beautiful of all the clambers is that called the "Crystallised Cavern," a large dome-shaped cavity, the height of which is estimated at 100 feet, and whose sides are adorned with numerous stalactites, that sparkle like stars when it is lighted up.

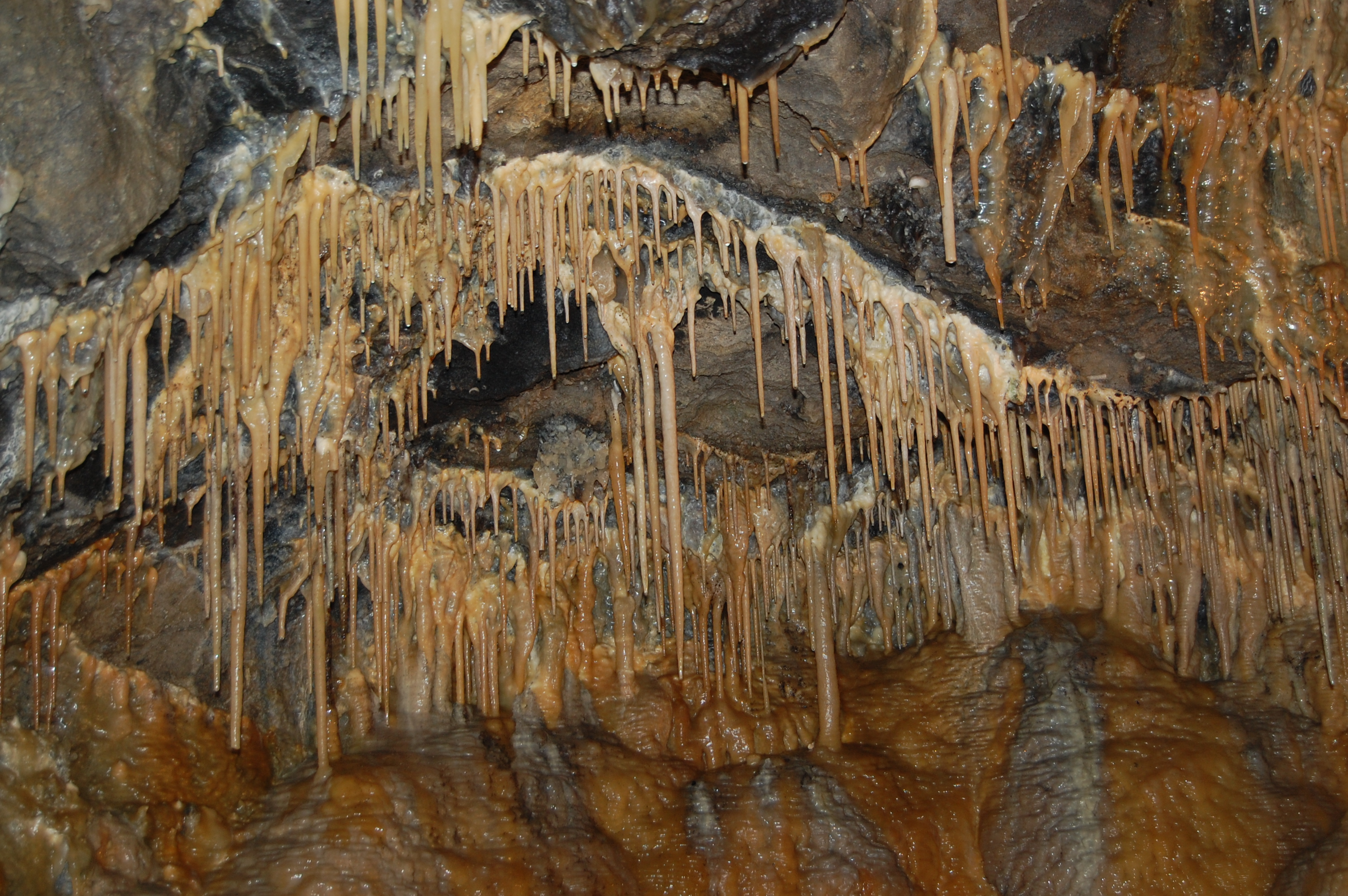
Stalactites in the New Series

Demand for fluorspar increased during World War I and much ornamental Blue John was extracted for use as flux in blast furnaces and in the chemical industry. In 1921 miners discovered the remains of three human skeletons dated to the Neolithic period in a nearby cave close to the surface. A little later, in 1926, miners blasting with explosives discovered an extension to the natural cavern, a section well decorated with stalactites: the New Series.

Commercial mining ended shortly after 1926 but in the 1930s miners returning to retrieve stored Blue John discovered a new, easier route into the New Series. This encouraged the development of the cave as a tourist attraction and the landowner entrusted John Royse, whose father and grandfather had been agents for Blue John, to adapt it for public display. It opened to the public at Easter 1935. Named sections within the show cave include the Witch's Cave, the Fossil Cave, Aladdin's Cave, Fairyland, the Dream Cave, and the Dome of St Paul's. Some of the formations have also been given names, according to their perceived resemblance to other objects, such as the Stork, which forms part of the cavern's corporate logo, and the adjacent Ram's Head, both within the Dream Cave.

=== Lost Vein ===
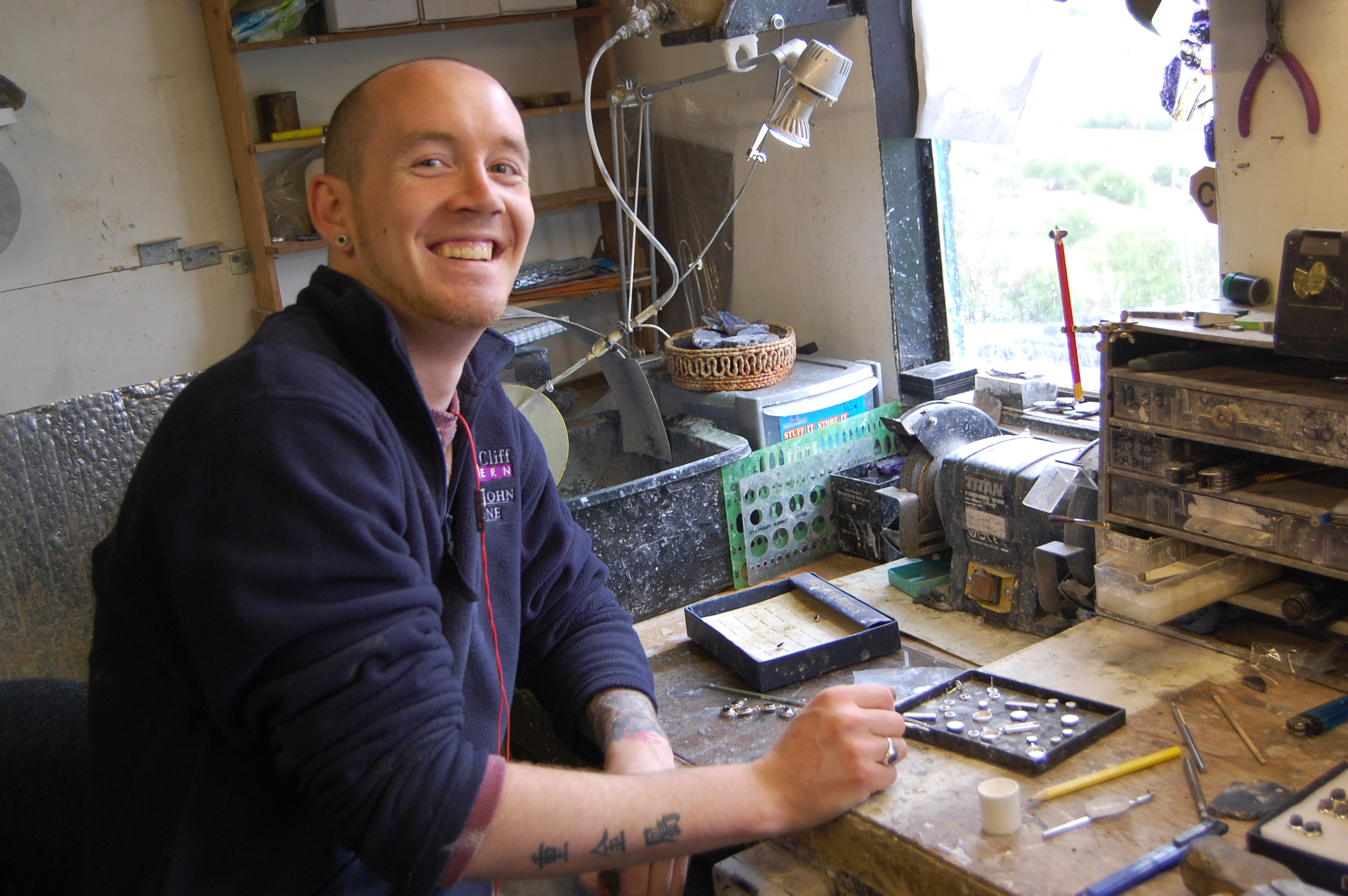
John Turner in May 2014

In 1945, the management of the cavern was taken over by the Harrison family who still operate it. The outgoing tenant John Royse, who was close to retirement, reported he had discovered a significant and previously unknown source of Blue John in the cave. Royse intended to return with the 19-year-old Peter Harrison but died before he could describe the location. The lost vein, concealed by wooden battens, a piece of carpet, and a layer of clay, was rediscovered in 2013 by John Turner, Peter Harrison's grandson. At current rates of extraction, the find was expected to last for at least ten years. The discovery prompted a visit by the BBC's Countryfile programme later that year.

=== Ridley Vein ===
In 2015, another vein of Blue John was discovered close to the tourist route by a miner experimenting with a new method of exploration using a specialist chainsaw. The first new source for 150 years, it was named the Ridley Vein after its discoverer.

=== New Series Extensions ===
In April 2014, after 18 months of hard digging, 2 local cavers - Mark Cope and Martin Barnsdall discovered an extension deep underneath 'Dome of St Pauls'. The extensions start in a small chamber to the side of 'Dome of St Pauls', where in the corner a vertical dig through mud and scree resulted in a twisting 10m deep shaft, called 'Crooked Spire Shaft'. At the end is a small vug of Blue John and Calcite, then underneatha tight squeeze leads to the top of a steeply sloping passage - '2014 Passage', off to the west side is a highly decorated chamber 'Wonder Cave', and small tight squeeze leads to a tiny chamber 'Emilys Cave' (after Marks then newly born daughter).

Another exceedingly tight squeeze leads to another small chamber with a brown flowstone floor and brown stalatites 'Brown River Series'.

Back at '2014 Passage', this descends steeply for about 5m into a large sloping chamber called 'Marbles' as the floor was tricky to walk over. This chamber has a vast amount of water flowing through from the ceiling as it is 20m directly below the tourist cave. In the SE corner of the chamber is a large scree pile with much water flowing through, the scree is thought to originate in the 1926 Passage some 50 to 60m higher. There are 2 avens in the roof of the chamber, only 1 has been climbed to a blockage thought to connect with a chamber underneath the walking route of the tourist cave.

Another squeeze in N side of the chamber leads down to a small chamber 'Measureless to Man'(named after instructions from the owner of Treak Cliff Cavern, Vicky Turner, to find such caves.) This then leads via another small 2m shaft and 3m muddy slope to the current end of the New Series, a tiny chamber where a small trickle of water disappears under a wall.
