= Blue John (mineral) =

Form of fluorite and semi-precious mineral

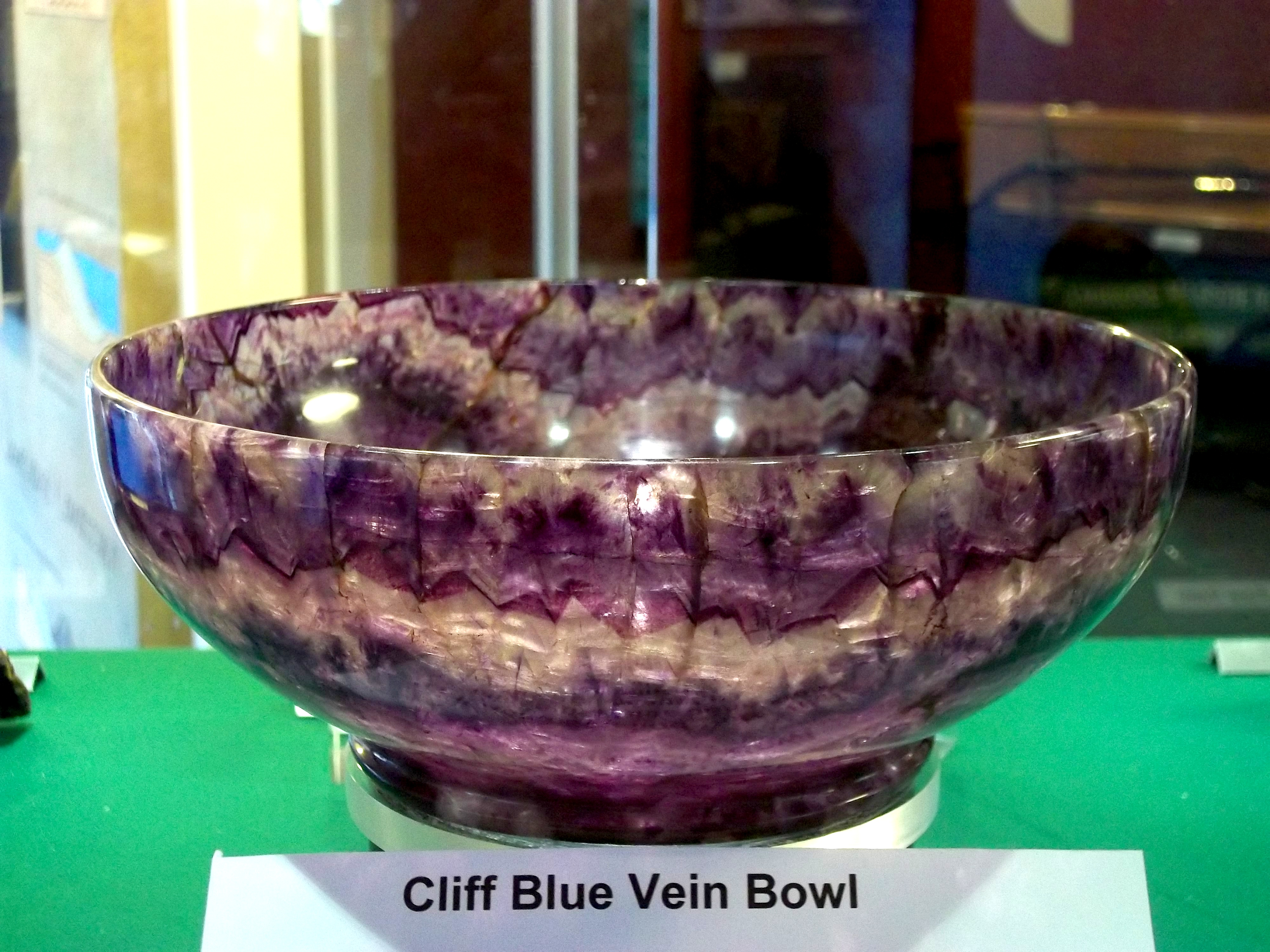
Bowl made from Derbyshire Blue John, on display in Castleton Visitor Centre

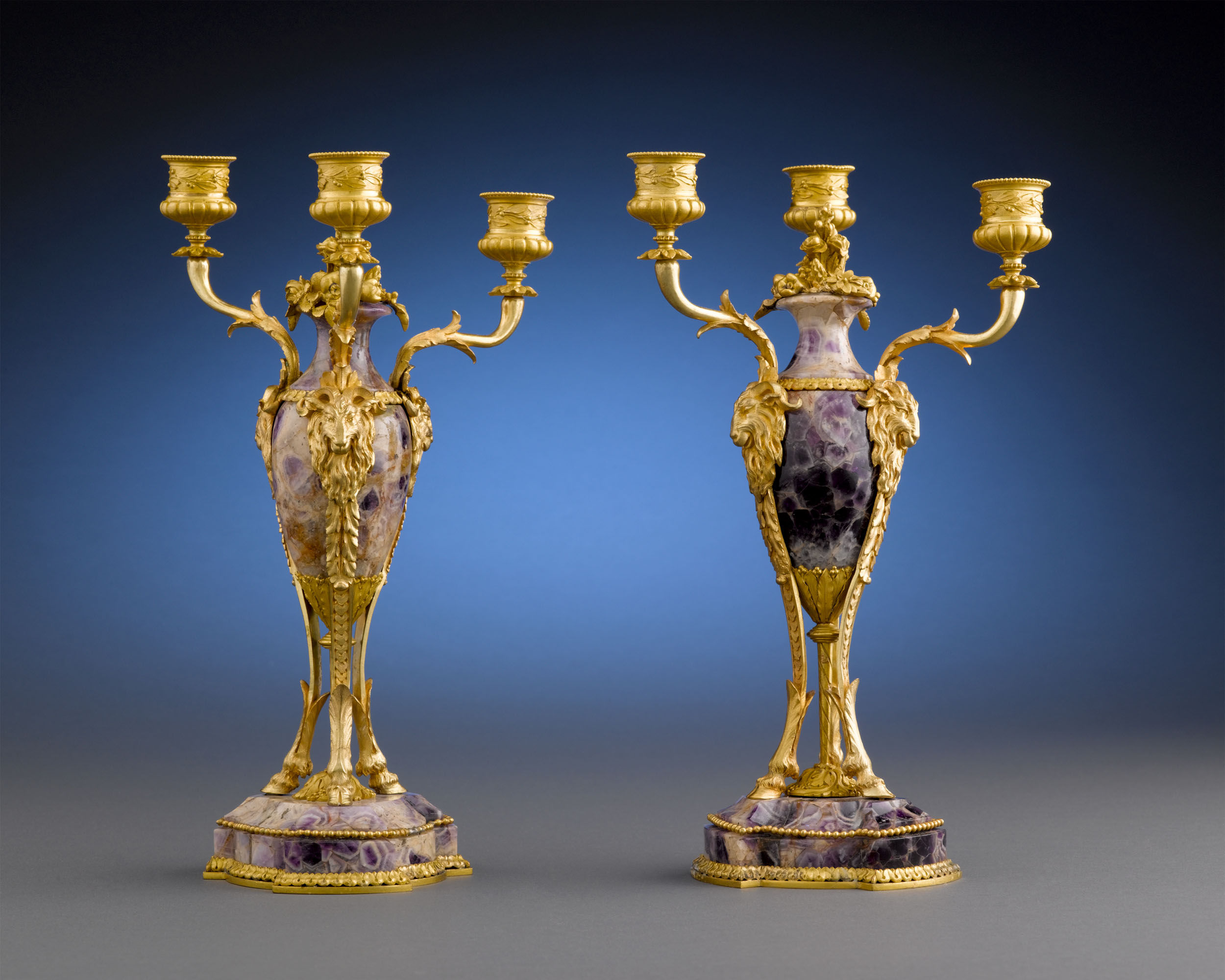
French candelabra crafted of Blue John, c. 1860

Blue John (also known as Derbyshire Spar) is a semi-precious mineral, a rare form of fluorite with bands of a purple-blue or yellowish colour. In the United Kingdom it is found only at Blue John Cavern and Treak Cliff Cavern at Castleton in Derbyshire. During the 19th century, it was mined for its ornamental value, and mining continues on a small scale.

== Etymology ==
The most common explanation for the name is that it derives from the French bleu-jaune, meaning 'blue-yellow'. It is said that Blue John was exported to France where it was used by ormolu workers during the reign of Louis XVI (1774–92). However, there is no archival record of any Blue John being exported to France, and the early ormolu ornaments which use Blue John were being manufactured by Matthew Boulton of Birmingham in the 1760s.

An alternative origin of the name derives from an old miners' name for the zinc ore sphalerite, which they called "Black Jack". Thus, the unique blue stone mined in these caverns could easily have become known as "Blue John".

Another derivation comes from the Cornish miners who began working the Derbyshire lead mines in the 1740s. The name "Blue John" is used for several minerals in Cornwall, including fluorspars, and derives from the Cornish language word bleujenn, in Old Cornish blodon, a flower, bloom or blossom.

== Geology ==
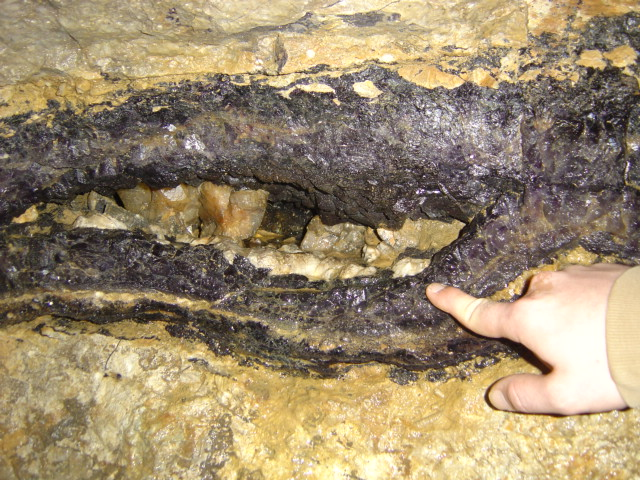
Vein of Blue John Fluorite in Treak Cliff Cavern

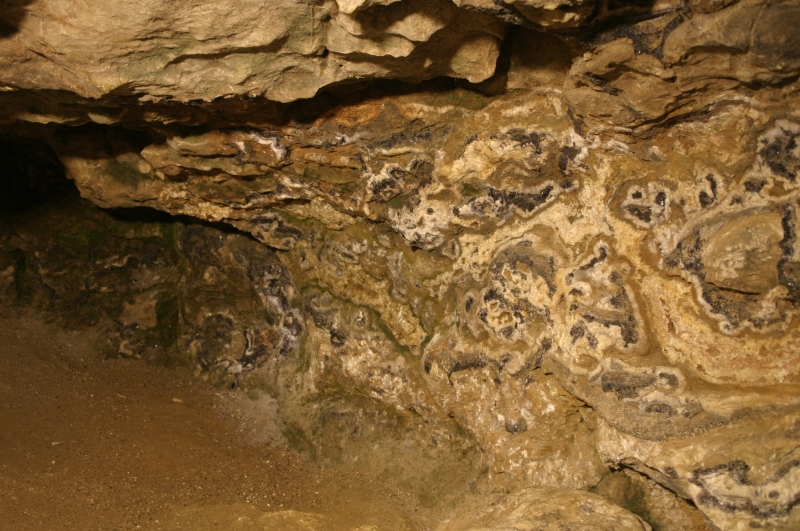
Blue John seams in Blue John Cavern

In the United Kingdom, the blue, banded fluorite known as Blue John is found only under the triangular hill known as Treak Cliff, just outside the village of Castleton. Today the veins are mined only in Blue John Cavern and the nearby Treak Cliff Cavern, although the abandoned Old Tor Mine on the north side of Winnats Pass was also, at one time, a source for the mineral.

=== Mineralogy ===
The mineral veins of the Peak District were formed during the late Carboniferous and Early Permian times, when the limestones were at a depth of 3 kilometres (1.9 mi). The minerals were deposited in veins by layers of crystals precipitating from hot fluids coating the walls of fractures, caves, and other cavities. Petrological analysis has shown that the Blue John, like fluorite elsewhere in the Peak District, crystallised from a highly saline fluid at temperatures of 90–120 °C or perhaps a little higher.

Despite much investigation, the origin of the blue colour of Blue John remains uncertain. Microscopic analysis has failed to find any impurities such as potassium permanganate or hydrocarbons which could produce a purple-blue colour. It is now thought that the colour may be a physical phenomenon due to crystal lattice dislocation. If the regular arrangement of atoms in the fluorite molecules are disturbed or dislocated, then this may yield the blue colour in Blue John. The cause of these dislocations is unknown, but one possibility is that it is due to colloidal calcium, i.e. excess of calcium atoms needed to form fluorite. Blue John can be decolourised by heating it in an oven for a few hours, a phenomenon apparently caused by the heat realigning the lattice dislocations removing the colour. Irradiating the discoloured Blue John in a nuclear reactor can bring the colour back.

=== Similar minerals ===
Blue, unbanded fluorite occurs in many localities around the world. Within the UK, blue fluorspars are also found in County Durham, especially Weardale. Elsewhere, blue fluorspar is known in the Ardennes region of Belgium; the Cave-in-Rock area of Illinois in the United States; and at various localities in Mexico and China.

Blue-banded fluorite is very rare. An ornamental mineral known to the Romans as murrhine may have been a fluorspar similar to Blue John. Recently discovered deposits in China have produced fluorite with colouring and banding similar to the classic Blue John stone. One source is the Deqing Fluorite Mine, in Deqing County, Zhejiang Province, the only source (other than in Derbyshire) that has an ornamental craft based upon it. However, although this fluorite is similar to Blue John its banding is straighter and it contains colours not associated with Blue John, suggesting they are compounds and not inclusions as in Blue John.

==== Roman murrhine ====
Roman writers, such as Pliny the Elder, refer to a soft ornamental rock which they called murrhine, out of which drinking vessels were carved. Pliny describes the mineral as having a "great variety of colours" with "shades of purple and white with a mixture of the two". Whether this mineral was banded fluorite is uncertain, but it was apparently soft enough (like fluorite) to allow one particular man of consular rank to gnaw at the edges of his cup. There is no reason to suppose the mineral came from Britain – Pliny and other writers specifically state that the mineral came from Persia. It is sometimes claimed that Blue John vases were found during excavations at Pompeii, but these vases are in fact made from banded amethystine quartz. However, two cups have been found among Roman grave-goods near the Turkish/Syrian border, on the former Persian-Roman trade route, which were made from blue-yellow banded fluorspar presumably obtained from the Persian source mentioned by Pliny. Both cups, known as the Crawford Cup and the Barber Cup, are in the British Museum.

== Discovery ==
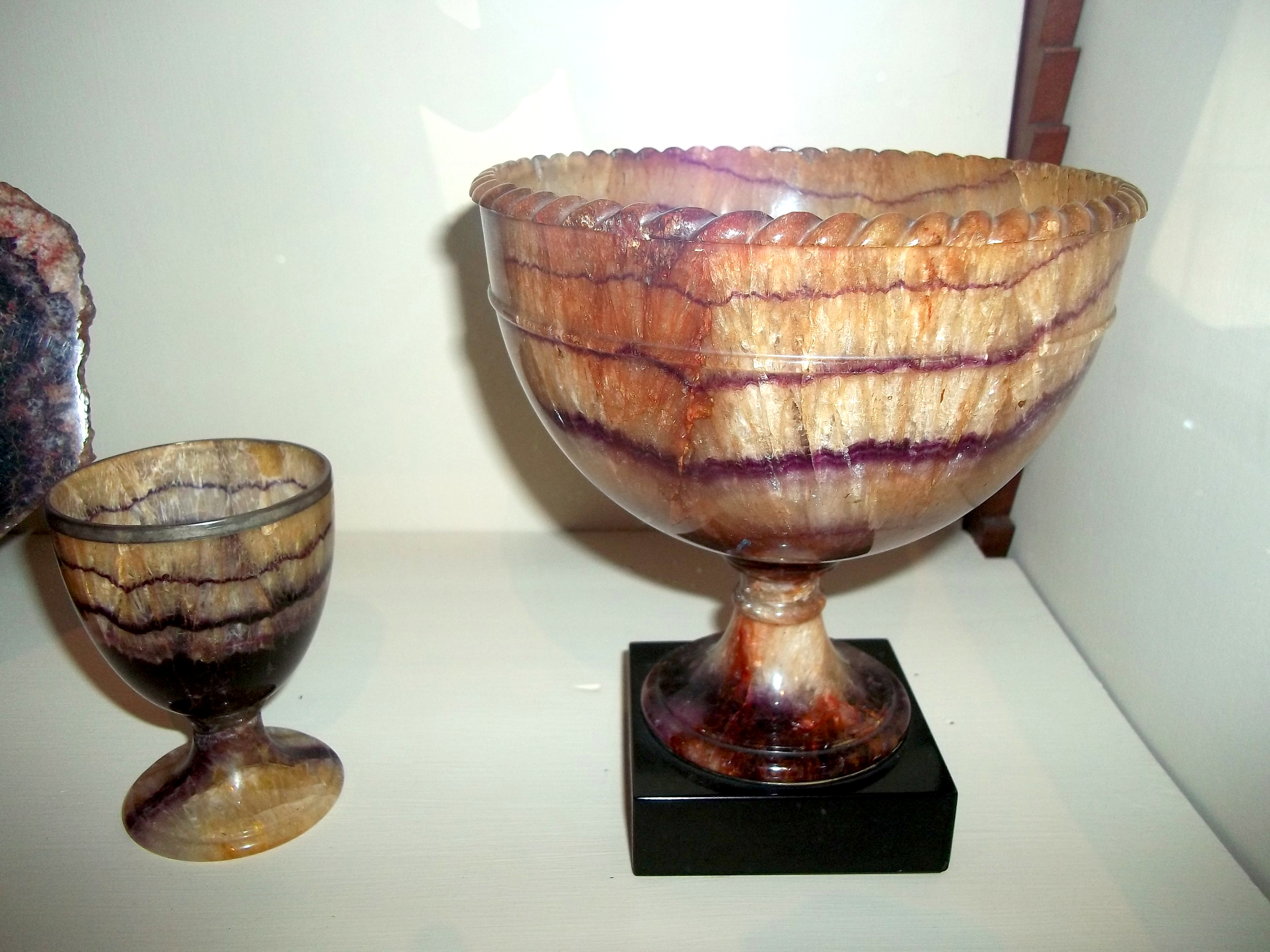
Blue John goblets on display at Chatsworth House

It is sometimes said that Blue John of Derbyshire was discovered by the Romans. However, the earliest source of this story is William Adam's 1843 book Gem of the Peak. It seems likely that Adam was attempting to add some mystique to the Derbyshire Blue John. Although the Romans did mine lead in Derbyshire, there is no evidence that they encountered the Blue John veins.

The earliest reference to the mineral "Blue John" occurs in a letter dated 1766 noting a lease from Lady Mazarine, which states that she "let ye Blue John, Castleton". The next reference occurs in a 1768 letter by the industrialist Matthew Boulton who attempted to purchase or lease the mines so that he could mine the Blue John to create decorative vases. It is known that by this date the mining of Blue John had been going on for several years. The earliest dated decorative applications of Blue John in Britain are those in use as fireplace panels. The bridal suite of the Friary Hotel in Derby has a Blue John plaque dated to around 1760. About the same time, fireplaces with Blue John panels were designed by neoclassical architect and interior designer Robert Adam, and put in place at Kedleston Hall near Derby.

== Later output ==
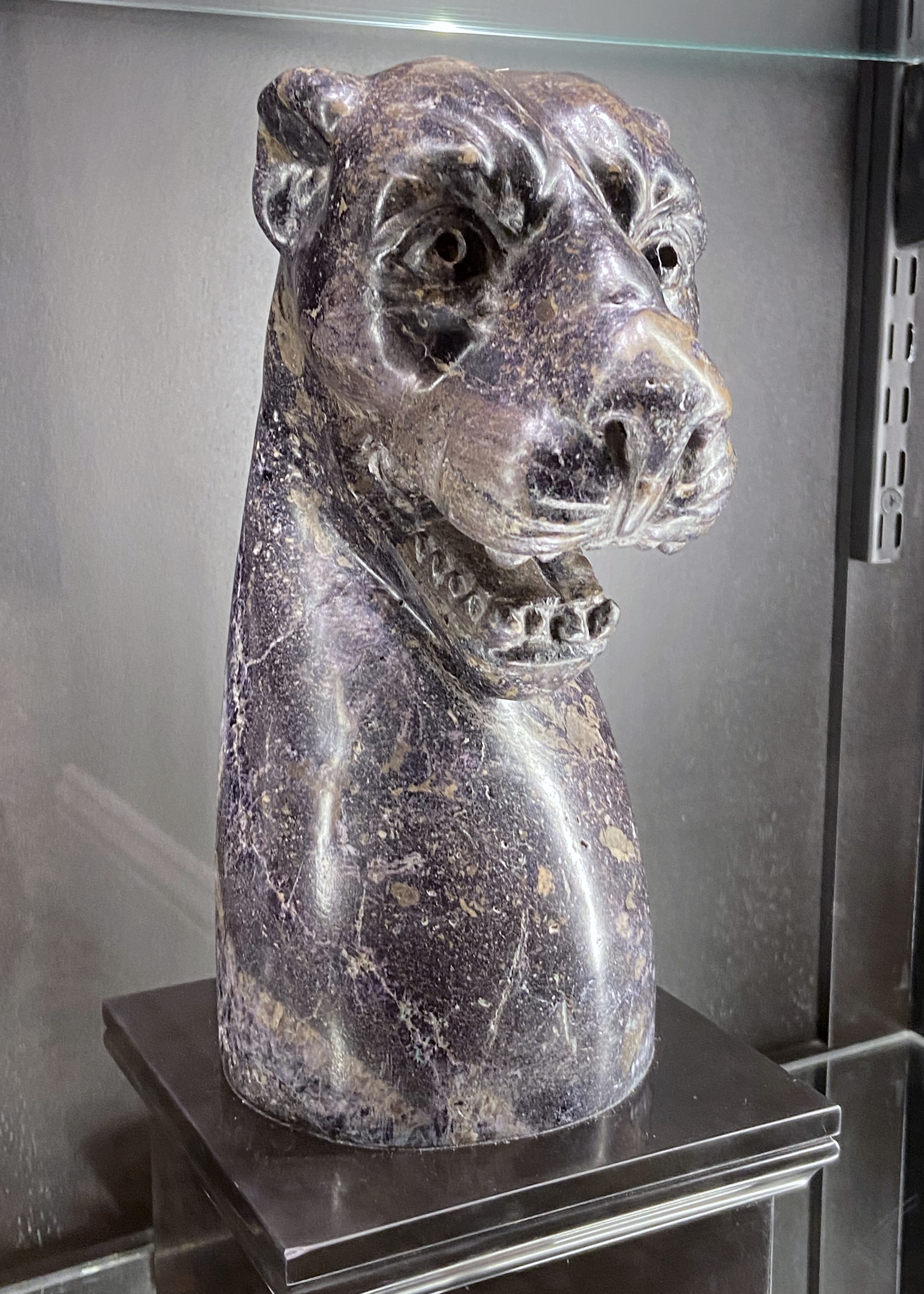
George III carved Blue John panther, c. 1790

By the 19th century Blue John was being fashioned into a wide variety of ornamental items ranging from knife-handles to chalices. The precise quantities mined in any given year are unknown, but 18th-century leases restricted output to 20 tons per annum. By 1892, the output is said to have been limited to 3 tons per annum. Today, production is probably around half a ton per annum, and the raw Blue John produced is kept within Castleton where small articles, mainly jewellery, are worked and sold. A "lost" deposit was rediscovered in Treak Cliff Cavern in 2013, and in 2015 a new vein, the first for 150 years, was discovered close to the tourist route in the same cavern.

Elsewhere, similar blue and white-yellow banded fluorite ornaments are now imported into the UK and other countries from China.

== Production ==
Before they can be worked, the stones (having been air-dried for at least a year) are heated in an oven, then placed in a bowl of hot epoxy resin (previously, pine resin was used), and then further heated in a vacuum oven. This drives out air from minute pores in the stone, and replaces it with the resin, which binds the otherwise friable crystal structure, allowing it to be cut and polished. After resining, the stones are cut on a saw. They may be made into rough cuboids or cylinders ("rough-outs"), for turning as bowls and vases, or flat slices, for making jewellery.

Rough-outs are glued to a metal chuck and turned on a lathe, sometimes using pieces of broken grinding wheels. The chuck is removed by heating the glue, or—if the operator is inclined—a sharp tap on the chuck with a spanner. A further resining stage may take place, before the piece is returned to the lathe and polished with wet abrasive paper. A final high polish is added using putty powder (finely crushed tin dioxide) applied with a moist piece of felt.

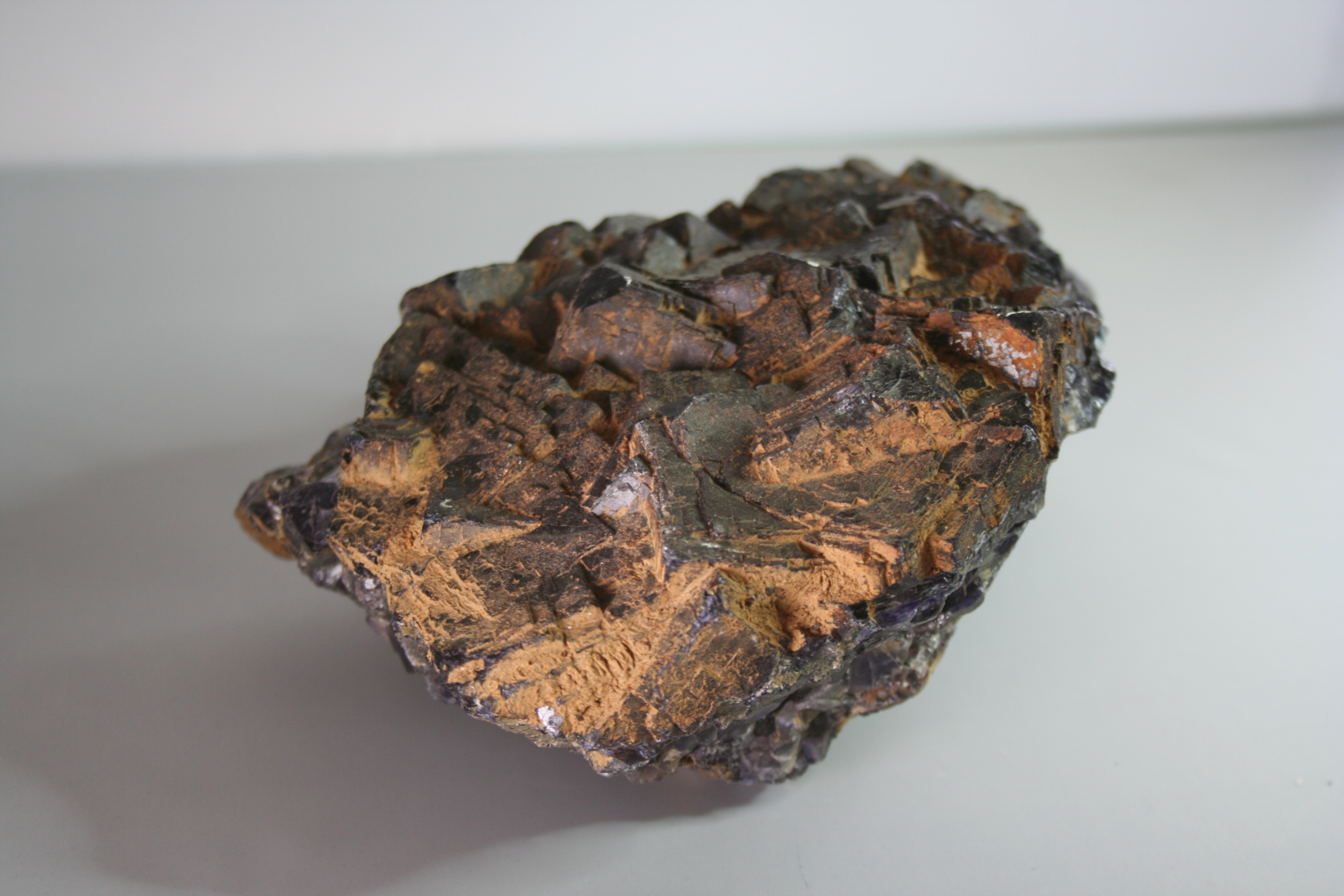
Blue John in its natural state

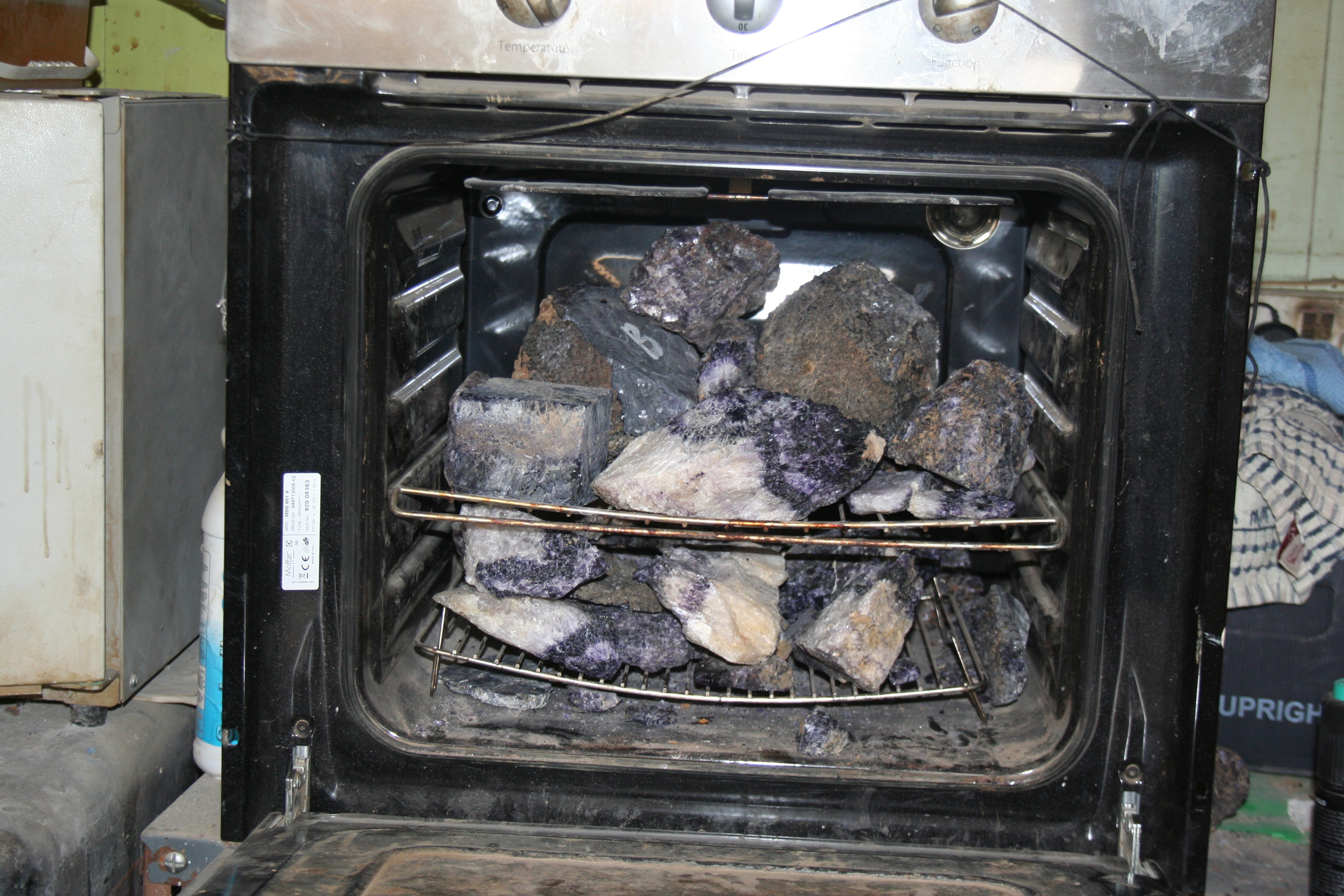
Heating stones in the oven

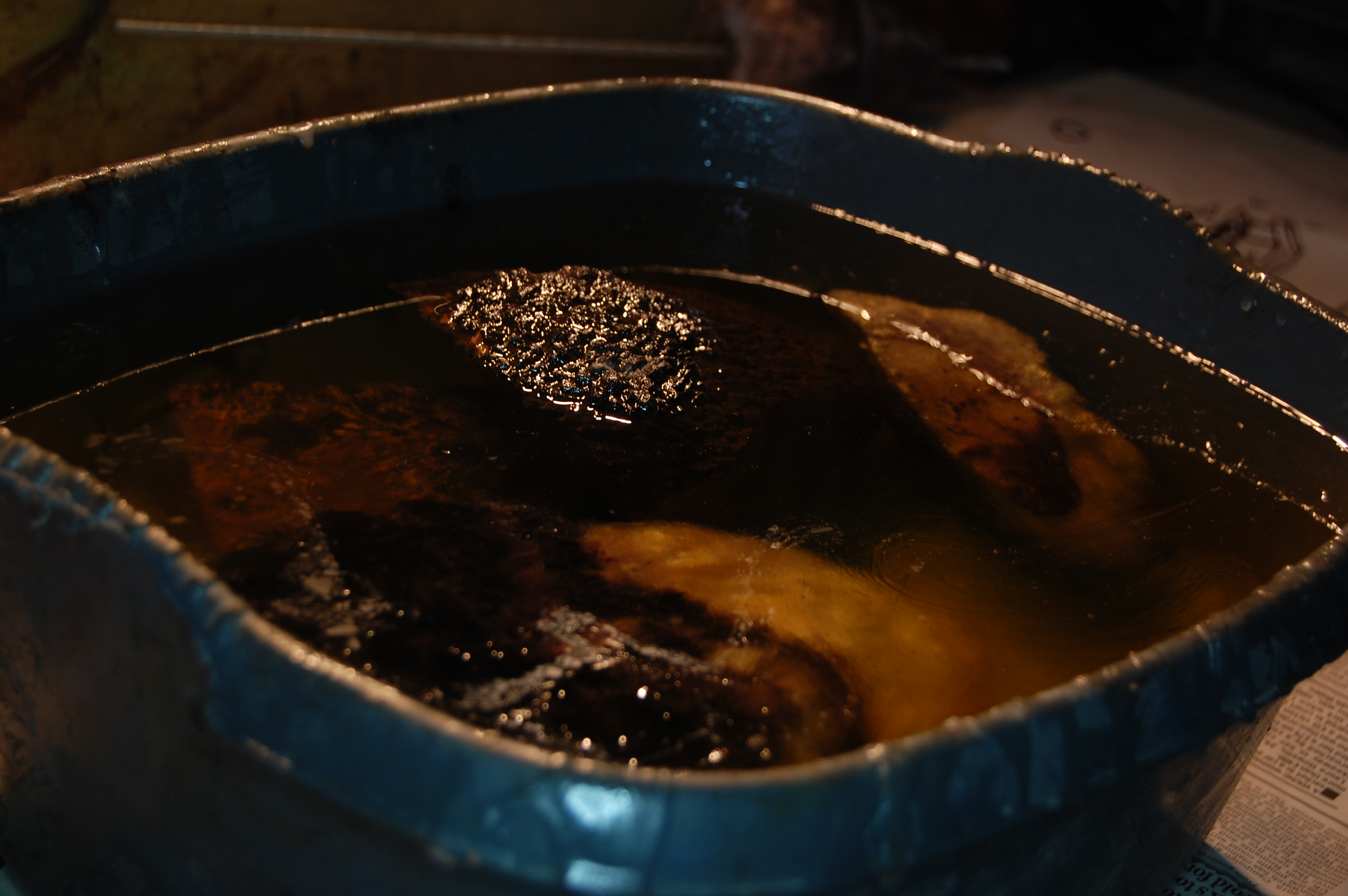
Hot stones in a vat of hot resin

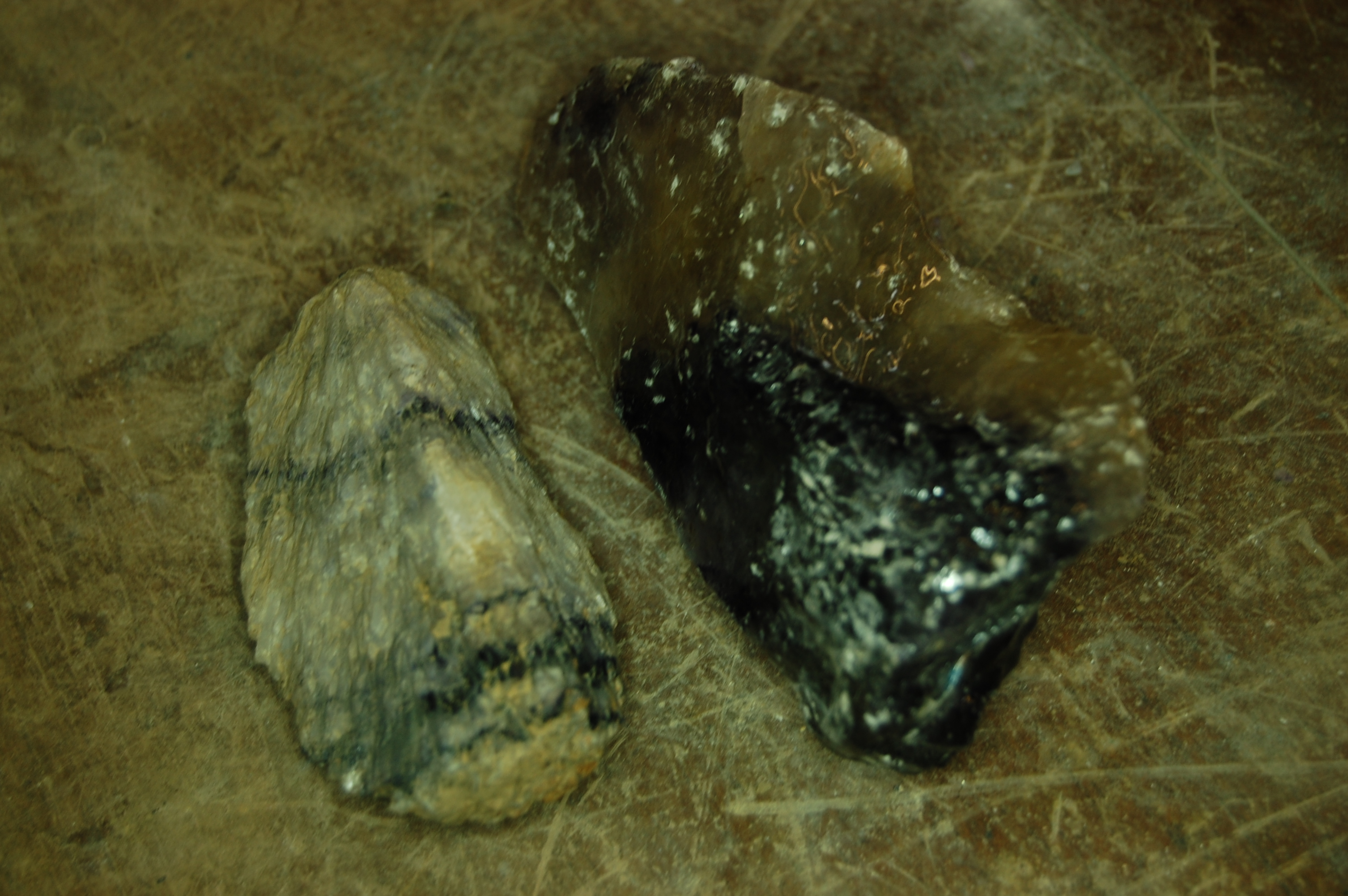
Unresined (left) and resined (right) Blue John

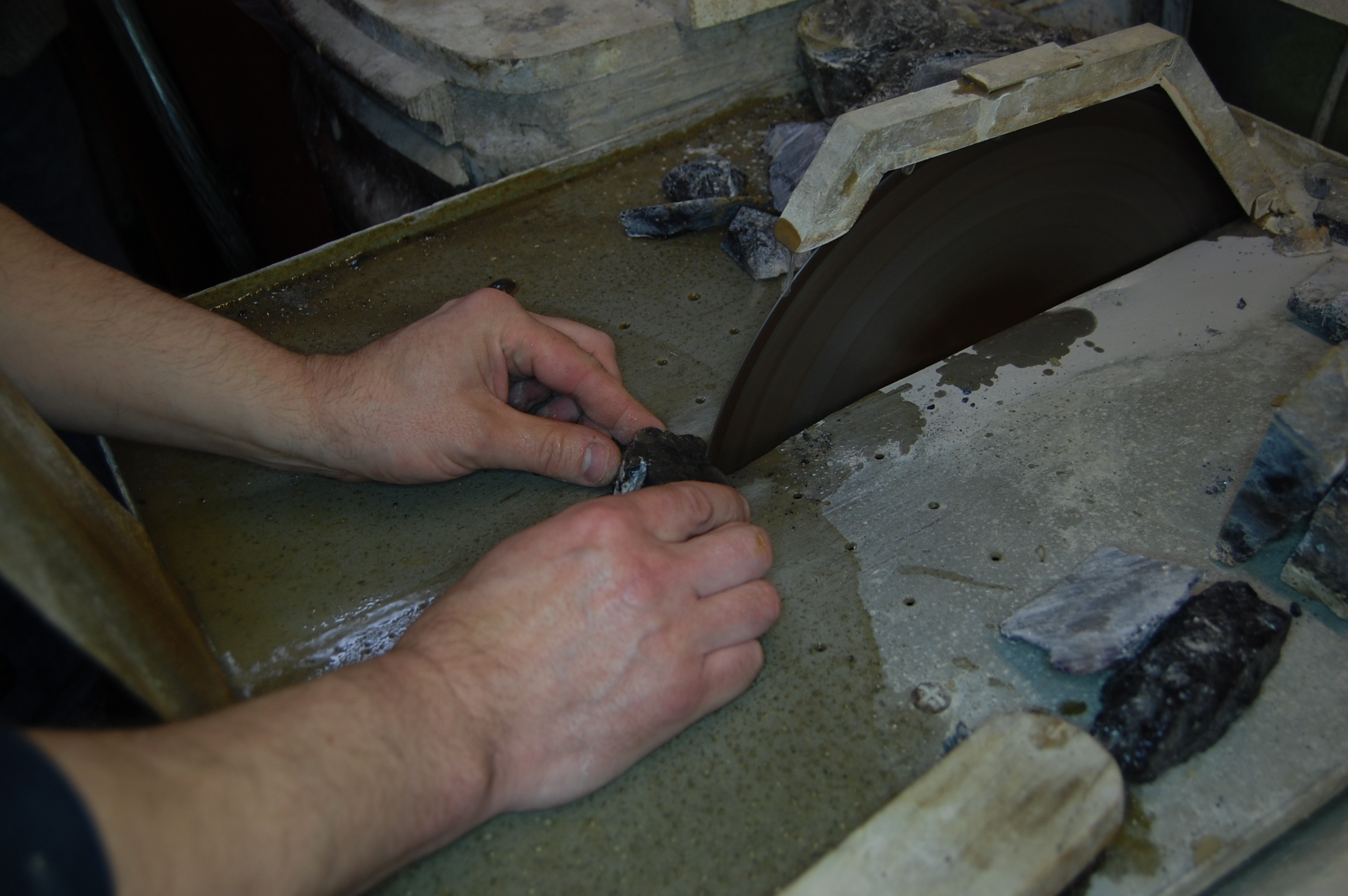
Sawing a block

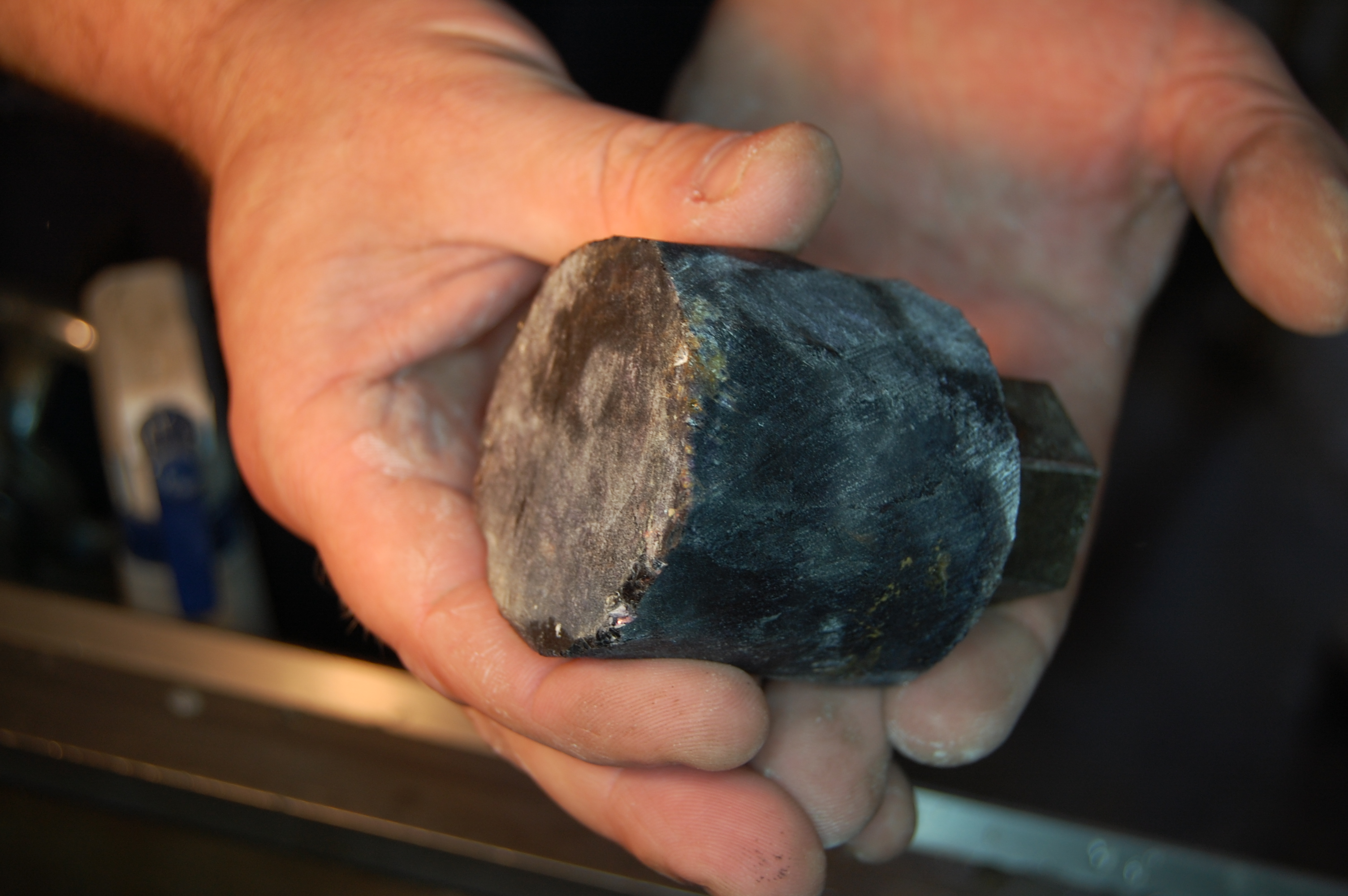
Mounted block

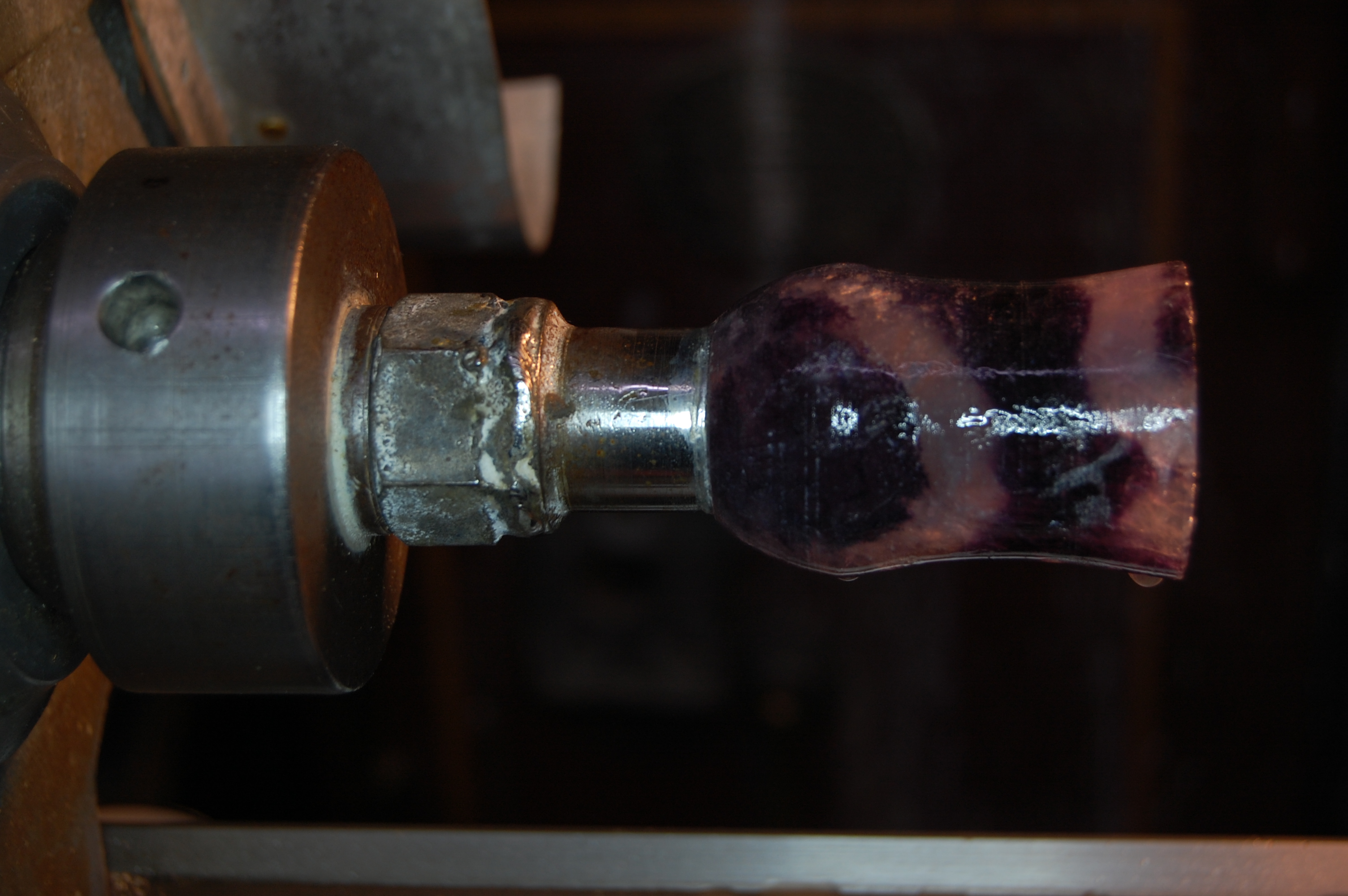
Part-worked piece on the lathe

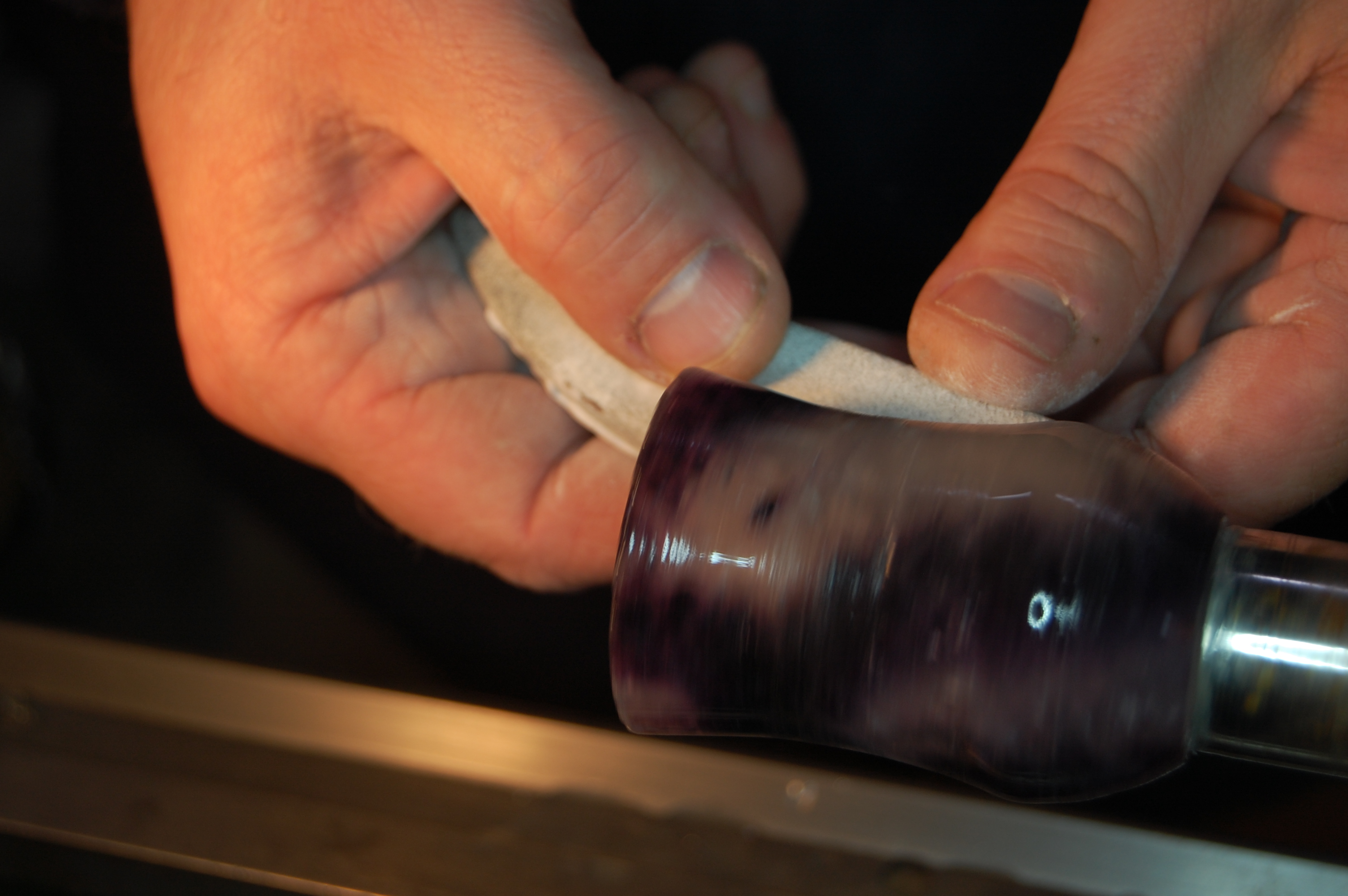
Working a piece on a lathe

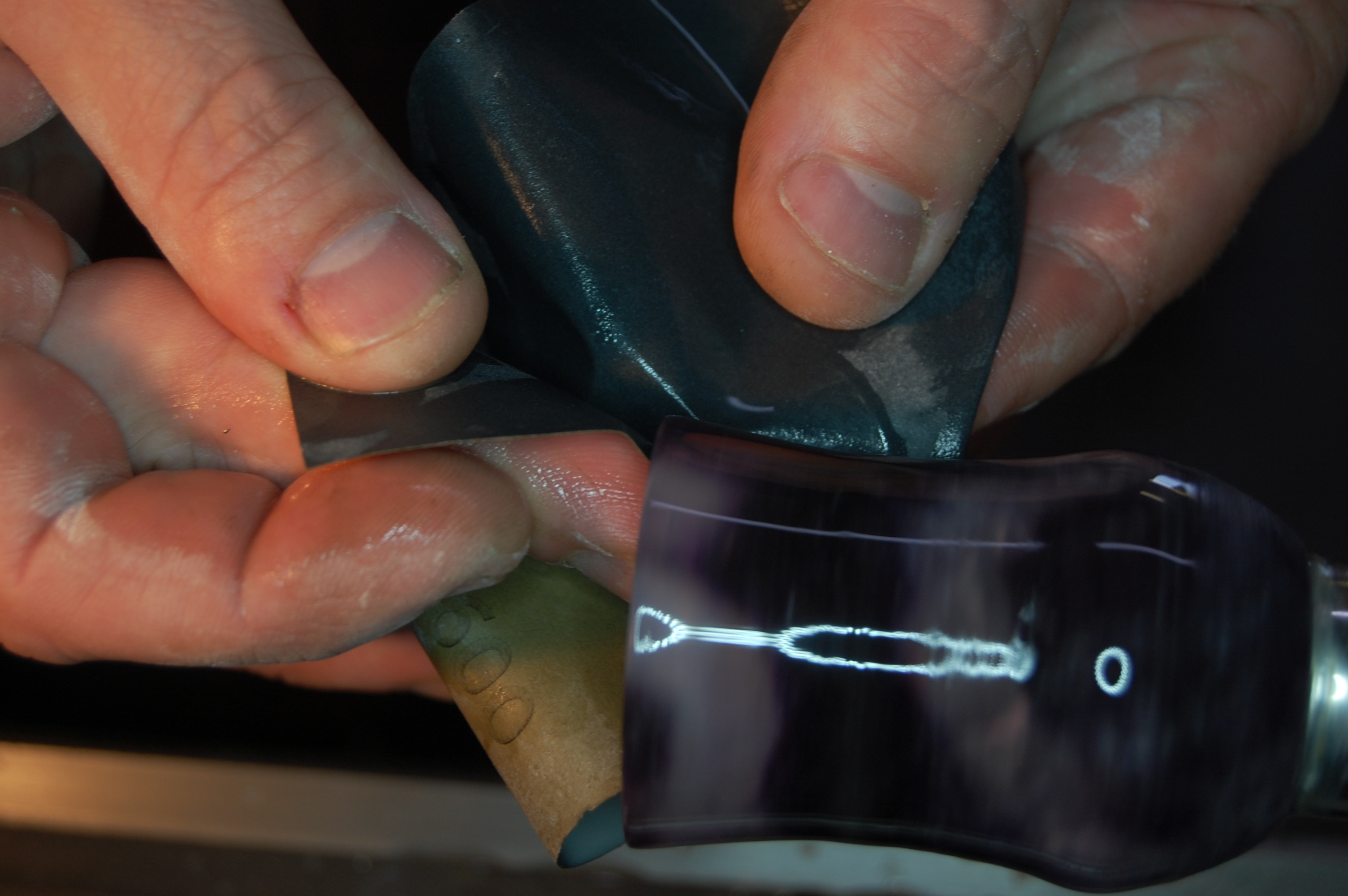
Polishing

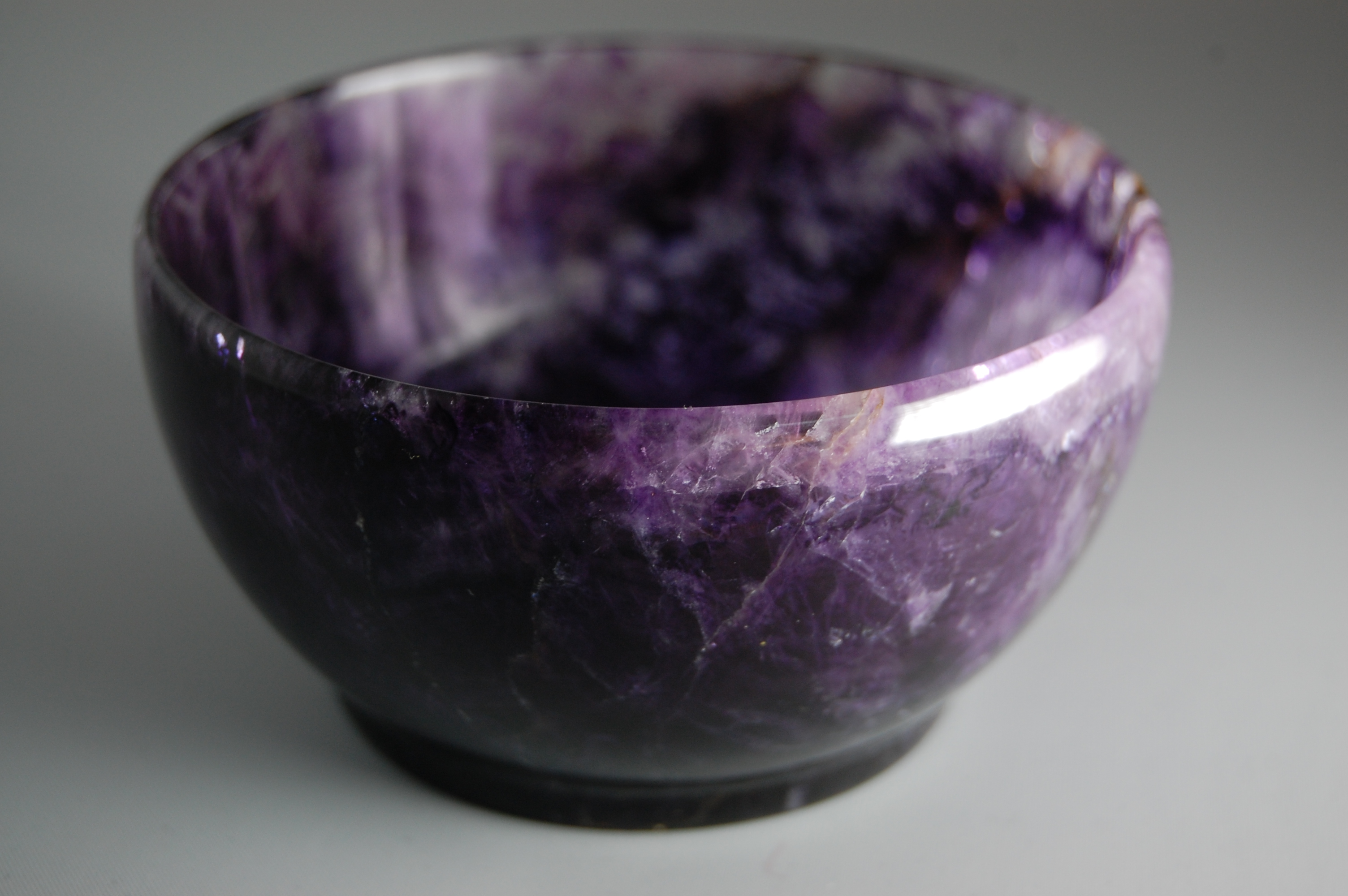
A finished ornament

For making jewellery, thin slices are marked out and cut into shapes such as circles or ovals, then finished on a grinding wheel. The rear faces of single-sided pieces are painted white before they are mounted.

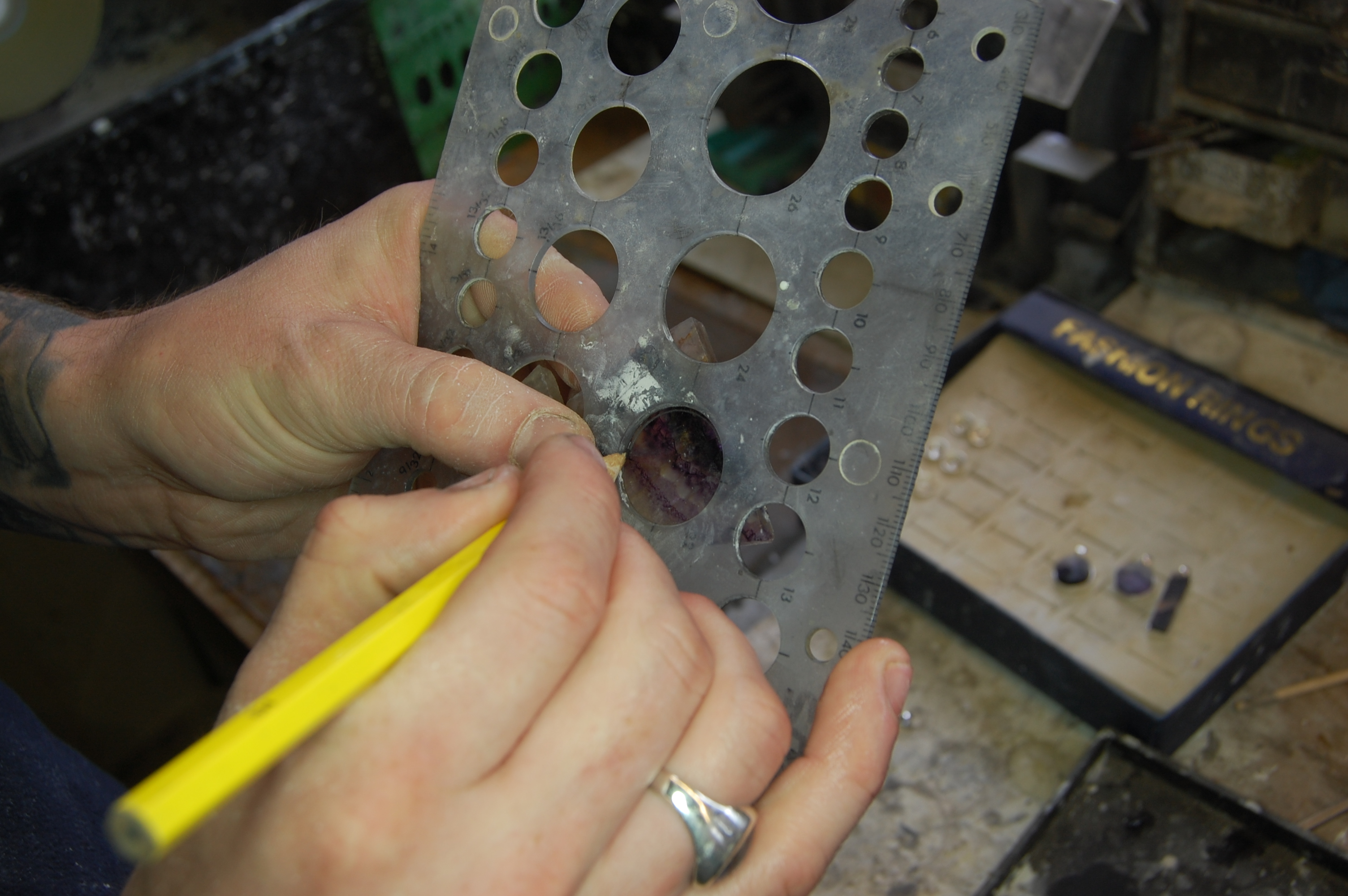
Marking a slice of Blue John

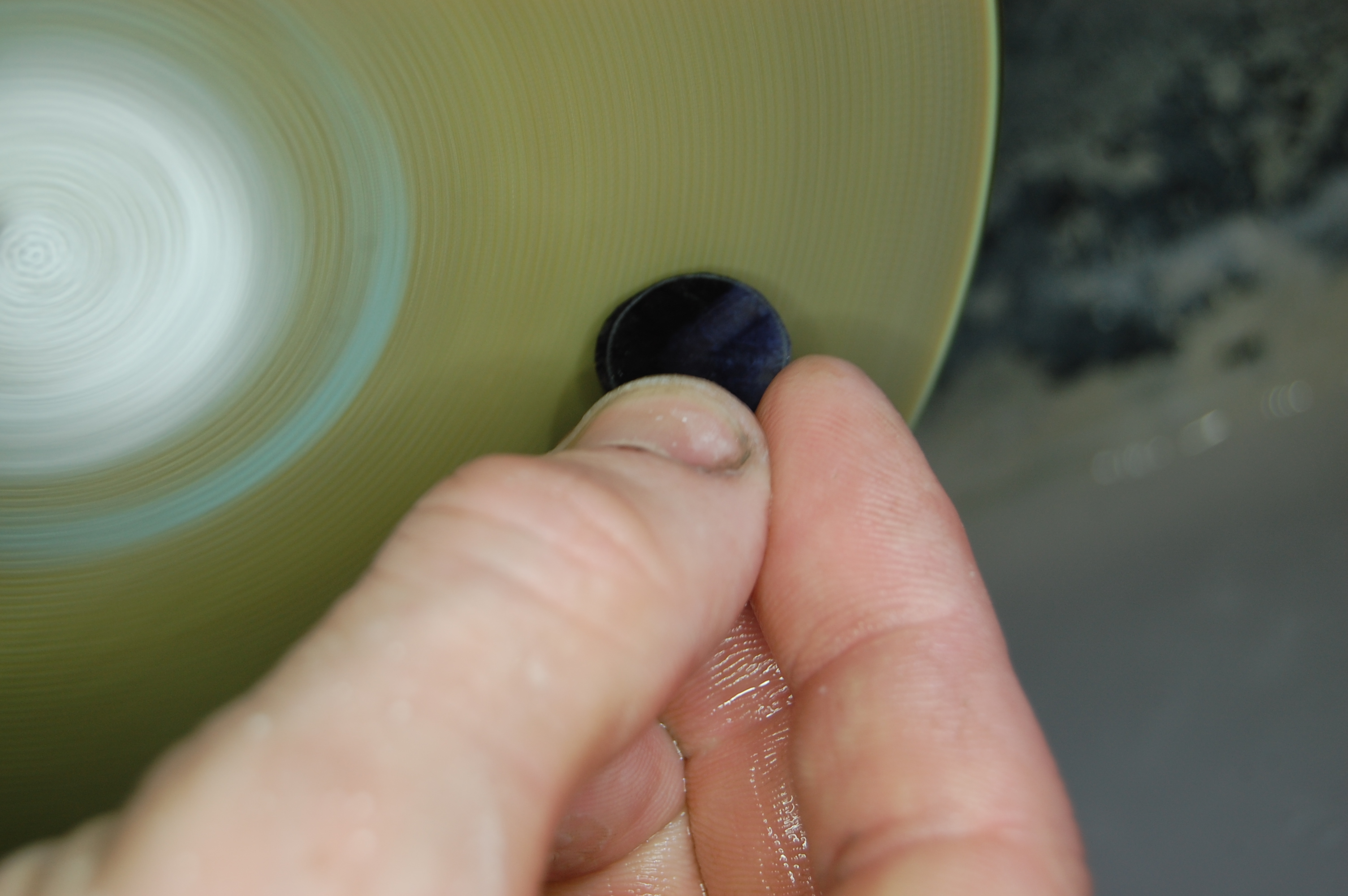
Shaping a jewel

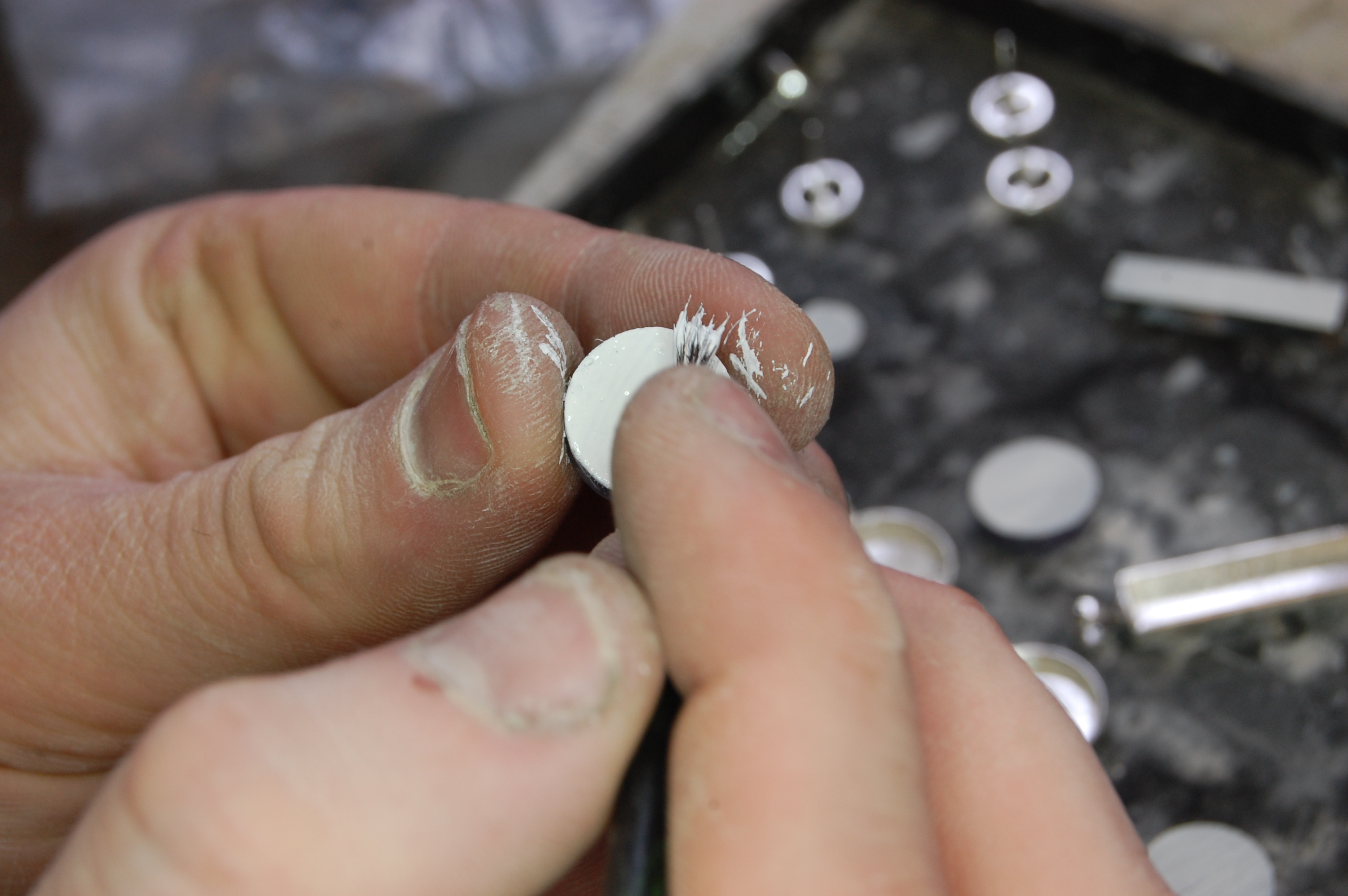
Painting the rear face

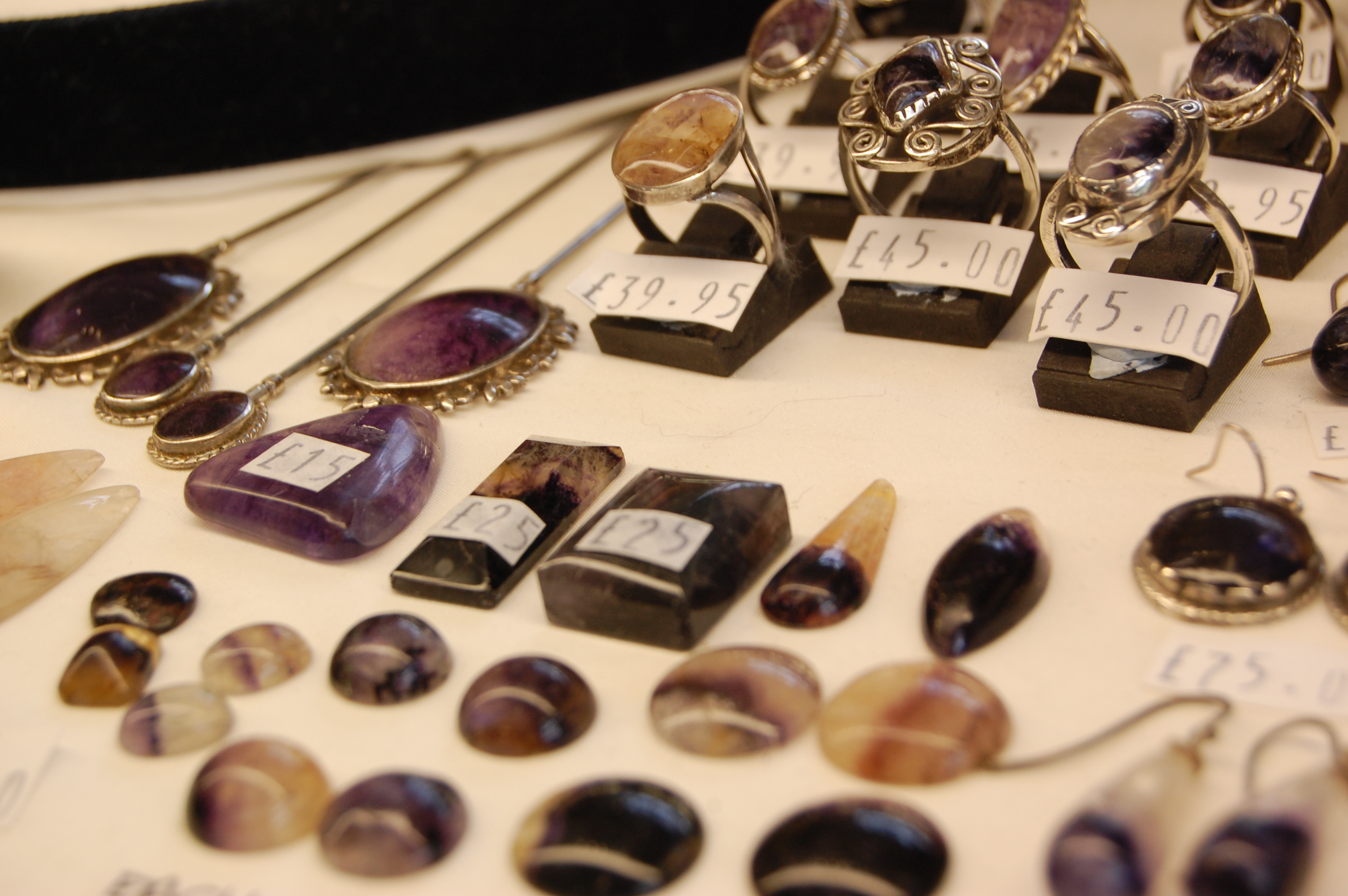
Finished jewellery

== In popular culture ==
"The Terror of Blue John Gap" is a short story by Sir Arthur Conan Doyle, which appeared in The Strand Magazine of 1910 and describes the experiences of a doctor who, while recuperating from tuberculosis on a Derbyshire farm, investigates mysterious goings-on in a cavern mined for Blue John.
