= Blue John Cavern =

Show cave in Derbyshire, England

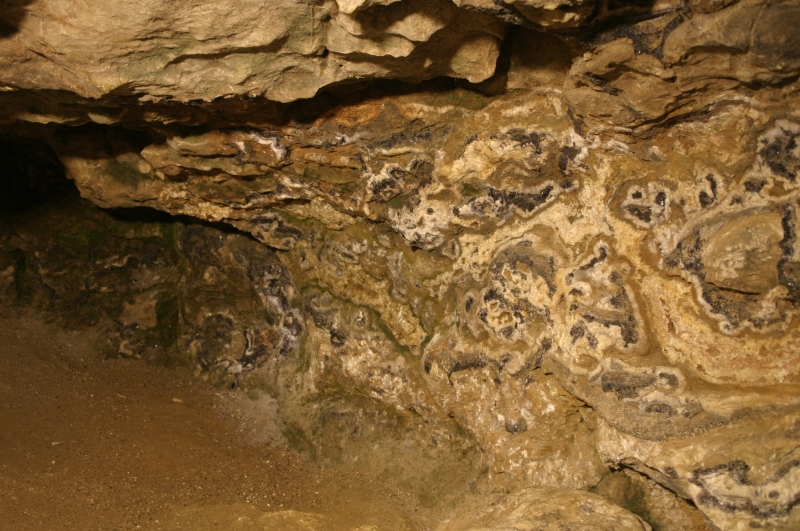
- Blue John seams in the cavern
- Interactive map of Blue John Cavern
- Location: Castleton, Derbyshire, England
- Coordinates: 53.3456°N 1.8035°W
- Geology: Blue John
- Entrances: 1

The Blue John Cavern is one of the four show caves in Castleton, Derbyshire, England. The others are Peak Cavern, Treak Cliff Cavern and Speedwell Cavern.

== Description ==
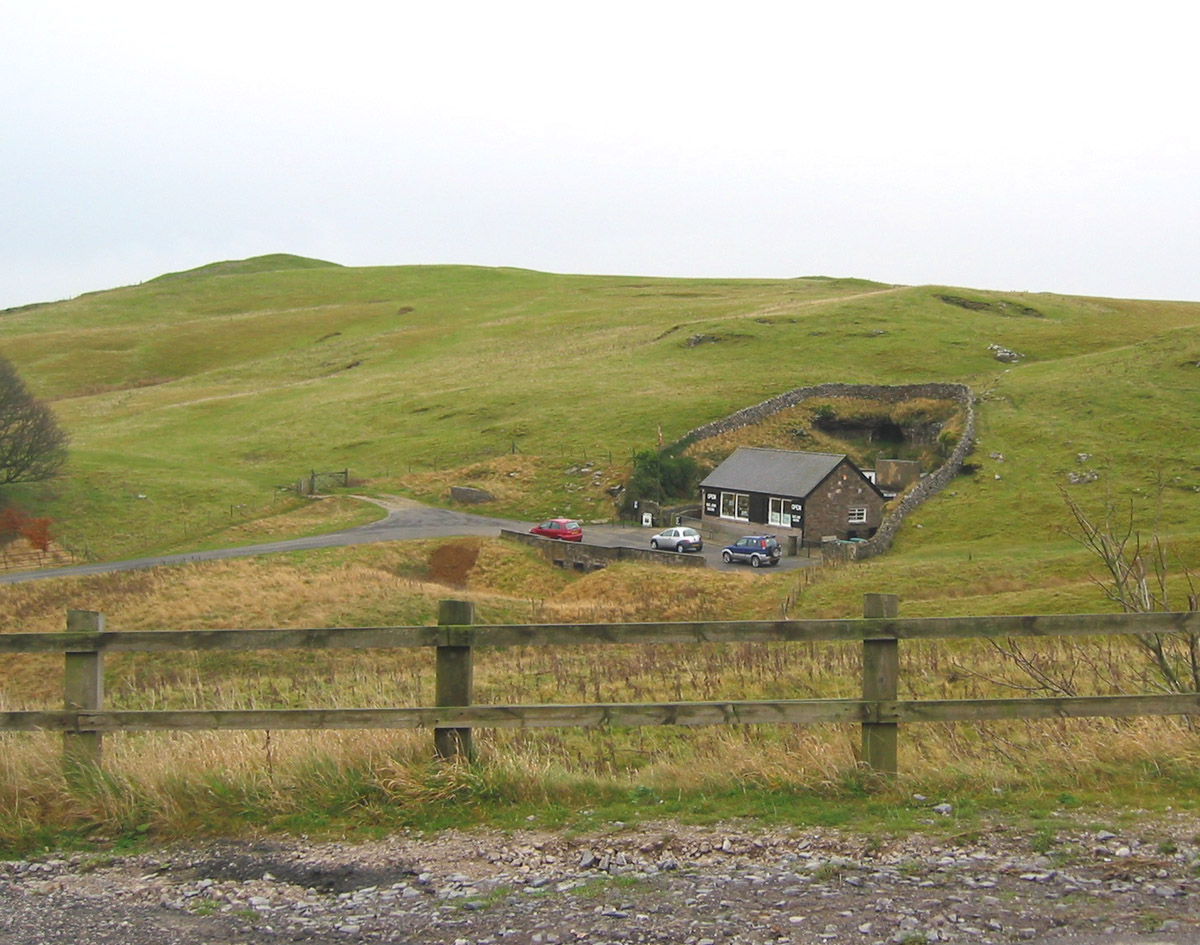
Entrance to Blue John Cavern

The cavern takes its name from the semi-precious mineral Blue John, which is still mined in small amounts outside the tourist season and made locally into jewellery. The deposit itself is about 250 million years old.

The miners who work the remaining seams are also the guides for underground public tours. The eight working seams are known as Twelve Vein, Old Dining Room, Bull Beef, New Dining Room, Five Vein, Organ Room, New Cavern and Landscape.

In 1865, Blue John Cavern was the site of the first use of magnesium to light a photograph underground. It was taken by Manchester photographer Alfred Brothers.

== Blue John ==
In the UK Blue John, or "Derbyshire Spar", is found only in Blue John Cavern and the nearby Treak Cliff Cavern. It is a type of banded fluorite. The most common explanation for the name is that it derives from the French bleu-jaune, meaning 'blue-yellow', but other derivations have been suggested.
