= The Terror of Blue John Gap =

- Short story by Arthur Conan Doyle
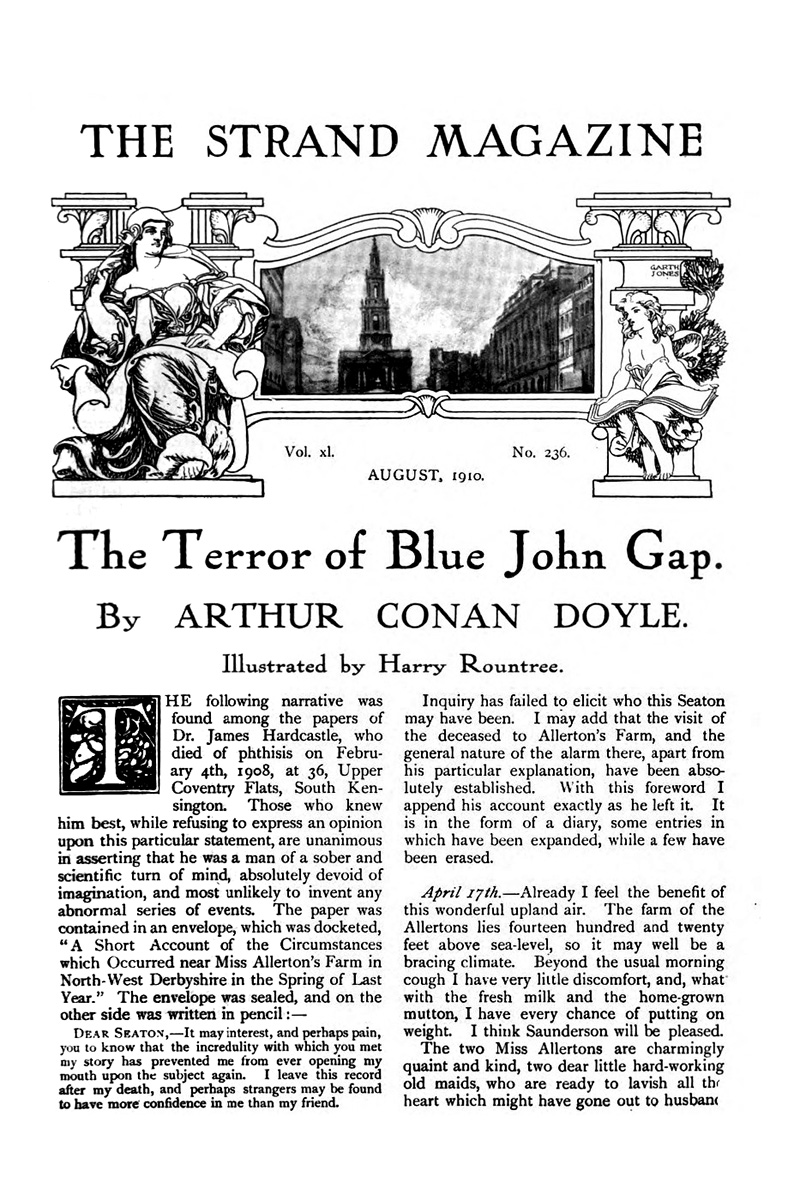
- The first page of "The Terror of Blue John Gap" as it first appeared in Strand Magazine in 1910.
- Country: United Kingdom
- Language: English

Publication
- Published in: Strand Magazine (vol. 40, no. 236)
- Publication type: Print, magazine
- Publication date: August 1910

"The Terror of Blue John Gap" is a short story written by Sir Arthur Conan Doyle. It was first published in Strand Magazine in 1910. The story comprises the adventures of a British doctor, recovering from tuberculosis, who goes to stay at a Derbyshire farm looking for rest and relaxation, becomes entrapped in a series of sinister events, and is forced to uncover the mysteries surrounding "Blue John Gap" and the "Terror" that lurks within it.

It is the subject of an ongoing study, "The Terror of Blue John Gap Project", by Margie Deck and Nancy Holder.

== Plot summary ==
The story is written in a frame narrative with Dr. James Hardcastle's narrative being the prime focus; his story was discovered after his death.

Hardcastle, who recently came round from tuberculosis was sent, by a recommendation from his physician, Professor Saunderson, for rest and recuperation to a farm and inn managed by two spinster sisters, the Allertons, in a little village surrounded by limestone hills, near Derbyshire. While he was out walking one day, he stumbled upon Blue John Gap, a Derbyshire Blue John mine created by the Ancient Romans who were trying to create a tunnel through the limestone mountain. He began to investigate the mine and the extensive underground formations to which it connects, despite remembering the superstitions of the villagers and the warnings of a local farmer, Armitage, who claimed it contained a monster that has been stealing sheep from the village only in the darkest of nights.

After dismissing all of Armitage's claims (which led to Armitage leaving him), Hardcastle heard a loud, unnerving shriek from the cave. Albeit initially dismissing the shriek as a trick played by his mind, he soon decided to explore the Blue John Gap alone. Equipping himself with candles and matches, he set out one evening to explore the cave. He reached relatively far into the cave (even discovering an apparent footprint on a patch of mud) when he stumbled upon a thick stream of water before him; upon trying to cross it, he slipped and fell in the ice-cold water and the candle was lost. After getting back up, he decided to wait in order to let his wet matches dry to use them on his other candles. While waiting, he heard something huge approaching him from the dark interiors of the cave. The monster stopped right before the stream, drank from it and soon left. Hardcastle soon lit another candle and saw new footprints, similar to the one before, and, seized by sudden fear, fled from the cave.

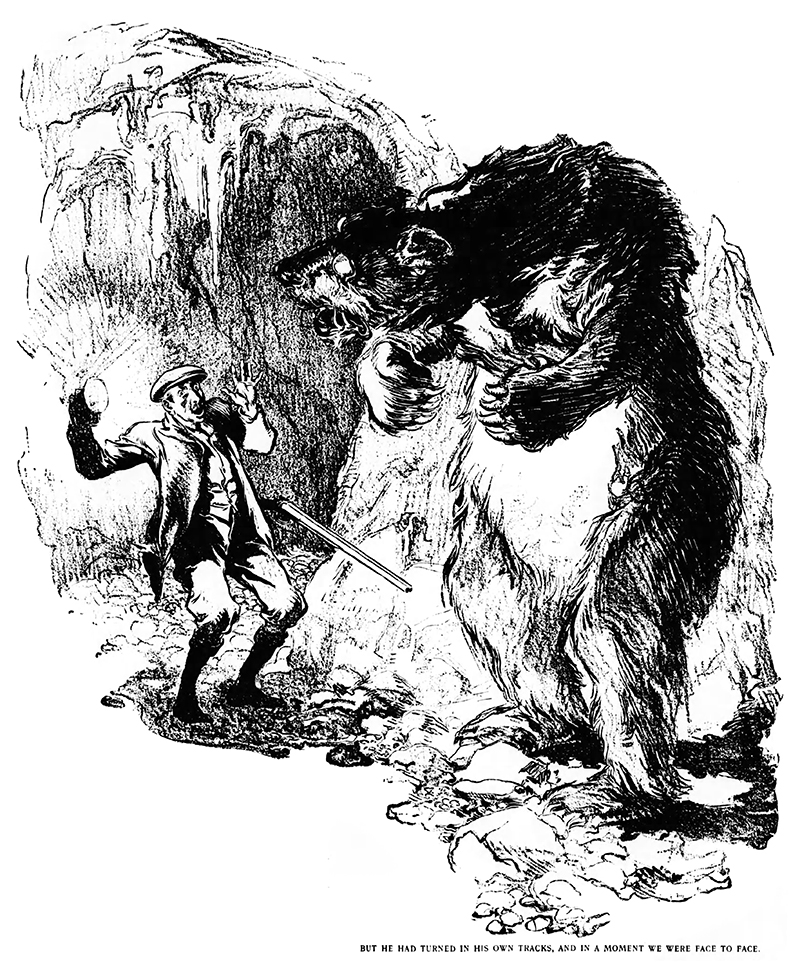
"But he had turned in his own tracks, and in a moment we were face to face." An illustration from the December 1912 edition of The Sun.

Upon understanding the truth of his experience after staying in bed for a few days, Hardcastle thought about looking for help from someone. He first visited Dr. Mark Johnson, a friend of Professor Saunderson, who upon hearing his account, sent him to meet Picton, residing in a small city next to the village, claiming that Picton can help. Upon arriving in front of Picton's house, and finding out from a shopkeeper that Picton is a renowned psychiatrist with his own asylum, Hardcastle returned to the village, and instead, went to seek help from the police, who also promptly turn him out and make fun of him later. Hardcastle decided to take matters in his own hand and armed himself for his next outing to the cave with a bright lantern, a gun, and some bullets. In the meantime, sheep had again gone missing from the village and, along with that, Armitage himself went missing. Despite the beliefs of the villagers that Armitage left the village to settle elsewhere for better livelihood, Hardcastle presumed that Armitage died at the hands of the monster.

On one particularly dark and cloudy night, Hardcastle set out on his expedition to hunt down the monster. He sat near the mouth of the cave, waiting for the monster to emerge. After 2 AM, the monster emerged from the cave and soon vanished in the darkness. Hardcastle began waiting for the monster's return. When the monster did return, Hardcastle picked up his gun and shot the monster while it was entering the cave, unaware of Hardcastle's existence. The monster fled into the cave and Hardcastle chased it. Pretty far into the cave, the monster suddenly turned around (due to which, Hardcastle got a good look of the monster with his lantern) and pounced upon him, intending to attack him, and Hardcastle was knocked unconscious. Hardcastle later found himself in the Allertons' farm, recuperating. He soon learned that the Allertons, upon reading his note (which he left behind for them in case he doesn't return), raised a search-party, who finally retrieved the unconscious and wounded Hardcastle from the cave, who was presumably delirious and spouting nonsense after his retrieval. After recovering a little, Hardcastle wrote down everything in his diary and spent one-and-a-half month more in the Allertons' company.

The local people, who believed Hardcastle's delirious tale, sealed the Blue John Gap to prevent the monster from returning, meanwhile the local newspapers published an article on Hardcastle's experience in the cave, denouncing it as fake. Hardcastle, upon reading the article, penned down his own thoughts about the monster's possible existence: Hardcastle assumed that the limestone hills and mountains housed an ecosystem of subterranean fauna created based on a subterranean ocean back in the prehistoric times. The monster possibly lived above ground, but soon went to the subterranean ecosystem and got trapped there, only to find an opening to resurface when the Ancient Romans were building their tunnel in the mountain. According to Hardcastle, the monster is a distantly-related ancestor of the bear, who lived in the subterranean ecosystem for so long, he got accustomed only to darkness, which was why the monster only used to emerge at night to hunt for prey and which was also the apparent reason why Hardcastle's lantern dazed it. Hardcastle ended his narrative, leaving behind his narrative to try to convince his London colleagues, especially a man named Seaton, who was never found.

== Themes ==
One of the central themes of The Terror of Blue John Gap is Hardcastle's difficulty in getting the world to believe him. This theme is mirrored with Conan Doyle's other character, Professor Challenger's struggles to get the world to believe the truth of his adventures in The Lost World (the creature in "The Terror of Blue John Gap" is a prehistoric survivor like the creatures in The Lost World).

It also echoes Conan Doyle's career as a campaigner for various causes such as the atrocities in the Congo and spiritualism where he was met with denial in the former case and doubt in the latter. In that respect Philip Gooden theorises that Dr James Hardcastle, and Professor Challenger, who boldly prove the scientific community wrong, may have been a wish fulfillment on Doyle's part.

== Characters ==
- Dr James Hardcastle: The protagonist of the story. A doctor who, while recovering from tuberculosis, discovers the mystery of Blue John Gap and bravely resolves to solve it alone when the world scorns him. While he emerged triumphant the ordeal left him a broken man. He died on 4 February 1908 in South Kensington.
- Armitage: A young sheep farmer. He was the one who first introduced Dr Hardcastle to the sinister goings on around Blue John Gap. He later vanishes without a trace and is presumed to have been killed by the "Terror".
- The Miss Allertons: Two elderly sister spinsters. They run the farm and inn where Hardcastle is sent to recover from his illness. They are described as quaint with hearts of gold.
- Dr Mark Johnson: A friend of Professor Saunderson. Hardcastle turns to him for help and he promptly sent Hardcastle to Picton's asylum as a result.
- Professor Saunderson: Hardcastle's Doctor. He was the one who recommended Miss Allerton's farm as a place for Hardcastle to recover and apparently grew up there himself.
- Seaton: A friend of Hardcastle. Hardcastle addressed his notes of the events to him. Enquiry apparently failed to identify who Seaton was and his identity, and even existence, remained a mystery.

== Locations ==
- Miss Allerton's farm: the place in Derbyshire where Hardcastle was sent to recover from illness. The farm is 1,420 feet (430 m) above sea level and surrounded by limestone cliffs and hills. Professor Saunderson was "not above scaring crows in those very fields."
- Blue John Gap: a mine, one of only two in the world where the beautiful and rare Blue John mineral is found. The Romans created the mine and, in the process, their shaft intersected into the great water-worn caves of the underworld.
- Underworld: Hardcastle discovers that the limestone hills are hollow; "Strike it with some gigantic hammer it would boom like a drum." Inside, he theorised, is a huge subterranean sea. The evaporation from this sea supports a forest and animal life, which entered the caves from the surface and became trapped when the caves were cut off. Since then they have evolved into the creature Hardcastle encountered.

== See also ==
- Blue John
