= Chinley, Buxworth and Brownside =

Civil parish in Derbyshire, England

Coordinates: 53.347°N 1.932°W

- Civil parish
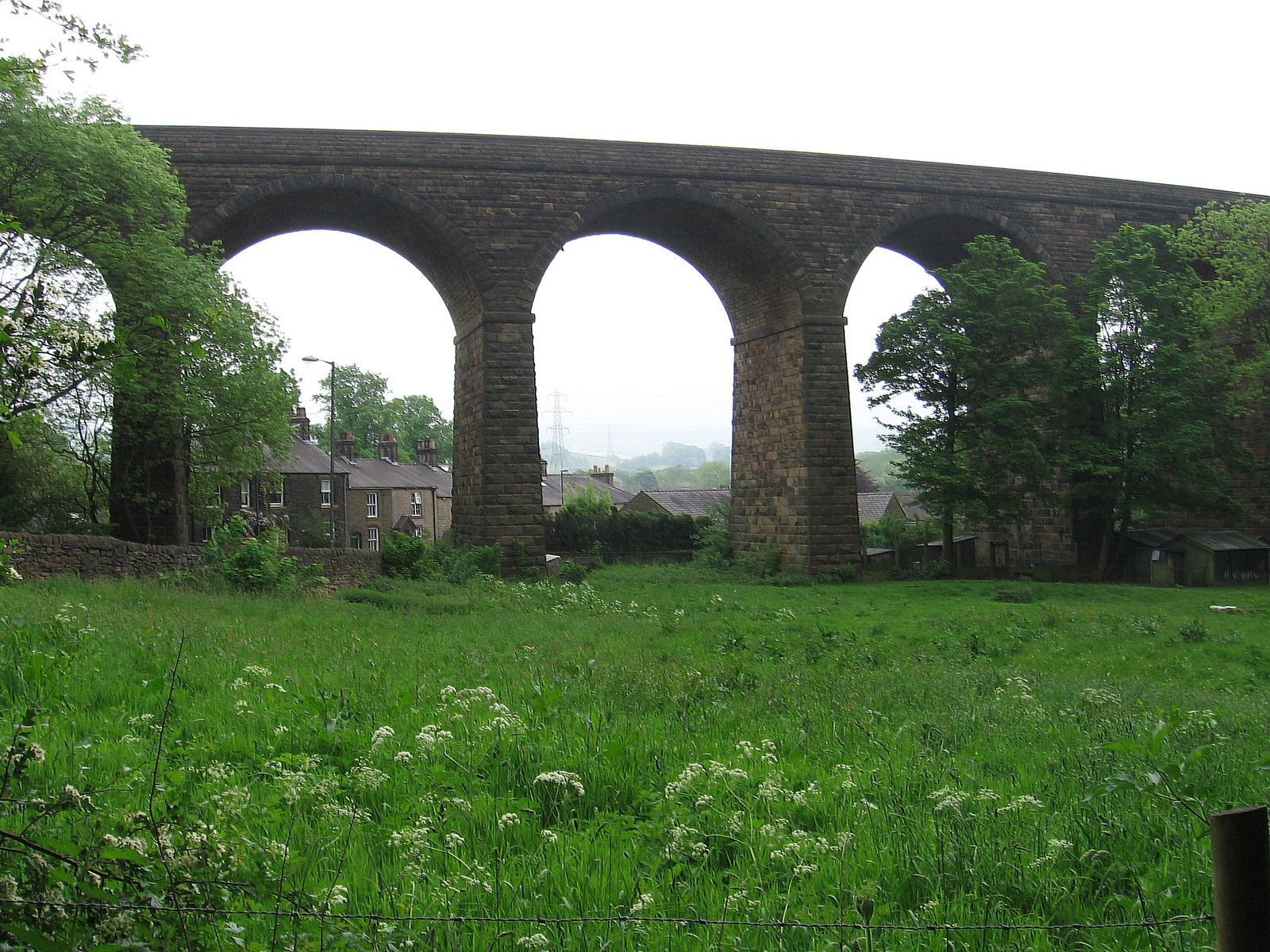
- Chapel Milton Viaduct

- Location within Derbyshire
- Interactive map of Chinley, Buxworth and Brownside
- Area: 6.38 sq mi (16.5 km^{2})
- Population: 2,794 (2021)
  - Density: 438/sq mi (169/km^{2})
- OS grid reference: SK 046833
  - London: 150 mi (240 km) SE
- District: High Peak
- Shire county: Derbyshire
- Region: East Midlands
- Country: England
- Sovereign state: United Kingdom
- Settlements: Chinley: Bridgeholm Green; Brierley Green; Buxworth; Chapel Milton; Chinley Head; Leaden Knowl; New Smithy; Wash
- Post town: HIGH PEAK
- Postcode district: SK23
- Dialling code: 01663
- Police: Derbyshire
- Fire: Derbyshire
- Ambulance: East Midlands
- UK Parliament: High Peak
- Website: www.chinleybuxworth brownside-pc.gov.uk

Chinley, Buxworth and Brownside is a civil parish within the High Peak district, which is in the county of Derbyshire, England. Partially rural with several villages contained within, its population was 2,794 residents in the 2021 census. The parish is 150 miles (240 km) north west of London, 35 miles (56 km) north west of the county city of Derby, and 1 1/3 miles (2.1 km) north of the nearest market town of Chapel-en-le-Frith. Being close to the edge of the county border, it shares a boundary with the parishes of Chapel-en-le-Frith, Edale, Hayfield, New Mills and Whaley Bridge. A substantial portion of the parish is within the Peak District national park.

== Geography ==
=== Location ===
==== Placement and size ====
Chinley, Buxworth and Brownside parish is surrounded by the following local Derbyshire places:

- Hayfield and New Mills to the north
- Chapel-en-le-Frith and Whitehough to the south
- Barber Booth and Edale to the east
- Furness Vale and Whaley Bridge to the west.

It is 6.38 square miles (16.5 km^{2}; 1,650 ha) in area, 2 3/4 miles (4.4 km) in length and 5 miles (8.0 km) in width, within the western portion of the High Peak district, and is to the north of the county. The parish is roughly bounded by land features such as the Kinder Scout nature reserve to the north and east, the Chinley-Edale rail link and the A6 road to the south, and the River Goyt to the west.

==== Settlements ====
There are areas of built environment mainly to the south of the parish, outside of this being essentially rural with dispersed settlements and farms throughout. The main locales are:

- Chinley
- Buxworth

===== Chinley =====
This is to the south of the parish, hemmed in between the Black Brook to the south and hillside in the north. It is the primary location of the parish, taking up prominence in the title as it is the largest urban area. Chinley maintains core local services such as food stores and hospitality, other retail, schools, railway station and churches.

===== Buxworth =====
Lying 1 mile (1.6 km) to the west of Chinley, it is a more scattered, less dense area, with the Black Brook and A6 road cutting through the settlement. Public functions here include school, public house, churches and canal marina.

===== Other places =====
Community areas, villages and hamlets within the parish include:

- Bridgeholm Green, east of Chinley
- Brierley Green, east of Buxworth, north of the railway line
- Chapel Milton, to the south east
- Chinley Head, in the far north
- Leaden Knowl, west of Chinley
- New Smithy, north of Chapel Milton
- Breckend/Wash, east of Chapel Milton and New Smithy (this crosses the boundary into Chapel-en-le-Frith parish)

==== Routes ====
The key road is the A6 from Derby to Manchester, which bypasses many of the parish populations centres and is to the south of Buxworth. The A624 from Chapel-en-le-Frith to Glossop passes through Chapel Milton, New Smithy and Chinley Head. The B6062 spurs off this at New Smithy into Chinley, through Buxworth, and connects to the A6 close to Whaley Bridge and Furness Vale.

=== Environment ===
==== Landscape ====
The Black Brook in the south forms a flat valley in which much of the populated areas exist. Outside these, it is primarily farming and pasture land throughout the parish, with patches of forested areas, mainly along the A6 corridor to the south west and at Chinley Head to the north. The parish is hilly bar the areas around the core settlements which are in the river valley. It contains some raised areas and slopes primarily around the national park region in the north and east. The location encompasses a number of Dark Peak characteristics, such as gritstone upland, pastures and moorland ridges and hills.

==== Geology ====
Throughout much of the western areas of the parish and river basins are superficial deposits of the Till, Devensian - Diamicton range. These deposits formed between 116 and 11.8 thousand years ago, dating from the Quaternary period. The bedrock of the parish consists of mudstones, siltstones and sandstones of various types such as Milnrow, Chatsworth, Roaches and Kinderscout grits, most formed between 329 and 319 million years ago during the Carboniferous period. There are superficial deposits of coal west of Chinley and peat in the upland area towards Brown Knoll, formed between 2.588 million years ago and the present during the Quaternary period. In the vicinity of South Head to the north of the parish are several shake holes.

==== Hydrological features ====
The parish western edge is formed by the River Goyt. Peak Forest Canal runs parallel to the river to the west. A tributary of the Goyt, Black Brook runs along much of the parish south boundary and doubles as a canal. The Otter Brook rises at Chinley Head and flows south through Chinley into Black Brook. Hockham Brook is another tributary that forms a portion of the eastern boundary. Roych Clough and other unnamed streams are on higher ground to the far east, some of which also marks an eastern edge of the parish.

==== Land elevation ====
The parish lowest point is along the far north west boundary by the River Goyt, at 140 metres (460 ft). The land rises towards the north and east, Buxworth is in the range of 160–205 metres (525–673 ft) and Chinley 180–230 metres (590–750 ft). Outside the settled areas, Browne Hill south of Buxworth is at 325 metres (1,066 ft), the parish rising more steeply once within the Peak District boundary, with several high points including Chinley Churn South at 451 metres (1,480 ft), Chinley Churn North at 457 metres (1,499 ft) and South Head at 494 metres (1,621 ft), all north of Chinley. The peak is along the north eastern border, by Brown Knoll at 569 metres (1,867 ft).

== History ==
=== Toponymy ===
The locales were not listed in the Domesday 1086 landholding survey, likely because of the wider area's designation as hunting forest owned by the king during the period. The three names demarcate the parish into informal areas.

Chinley first appeared in the late 13th century, recorded in public records with the alternate spellings Chynley(e), Chinley(e), Chinle and Chinlege. It meant 'clearing in a deep valley'.

Buxworth was Buggisworth(e), Bugg(e)sworth(e), Bugg(e)sword also first seen in the 13th century, possibly derived from an Anglo Saxon manor owner Bugca, meaning 'Bugca's enclosure', but more likely to derive from Ralph Bugge from Nottingham who became the Bailiff of the Forest in the Peak in 1250, whose enclosure covered the present area. It was later changed by local government order from Bugsworth to Buxworth in 1935.

The name Brownside is a now little-used reference to a hamlet east of the A624 road that was first reported in the 16th century, grouping a number of scattered farms close by Breckend and Wash, and is possibly in reference to the dark, peaty landscape contained within the upper slopes of Brown Knoll which is now part of the Peak District National Park to the far east of the parish.

=== Parish and environment ===
==== Prehistory to medieval era and early economy ====
The area has unearthed few prehistoric and early history remains, such as flint scatter along the banks of the Roych Clough of unknown date or era, although similar finds in the region are estimated to be from the early Mesolithic to late Neolithic (10000 BC to 2351 BC) period. Also undated are the possible remains of a tumulus on Chinley Churn or Roman (43 AD to 410 AD) camp, which could be simple earthworks of a later period. A suggested route of a nearby Roman road from Buxton to Glossop 1/2 mile (0.80 km) to the east, comes through Wash village and follows the path of the present day A624 Hayfield Road. A carved stone head with Celt stylings, appearing to date from much older although generally were medieval creations, was found in the Hough area north of Buxworth after the millennium. Black Brook was named from antiquity, the darkness of its waters derived from the peat surrounding its upland source.

Chinley was also known alternately as Mainstonefield in the Middle Ages and Medieval period. The wider area was part of the Royal Forest of High Peak, established since the time of the Norman Conquest of 1066 by William the Conqueror. It spread across over 180 square miles (470 km^{2}), and the parish was then a part of the Campagna ward of the forest. William Peveril was the initial steward and he was based at Peveril Castle, his descendants continued to oversee the forest laws, but the area was later repossessed by King Henry II after the family fell out of favour. The forest was granted away several times since to others including royal sons, until coming under the ownership of the Duchy of Lancaster at the end of the 14th century. Merevale Abbey, a Cistercian religious order was founded in 1148 and in the early 12th century granted a herbage near Chinley Head, now known as Monk's Meadow Farm, the Duchy however continued to collect rent on the holdings for several centuries. In around 1157 the ancient parish of Glossop was established, Bowden Middlecale was a southern subdivision for taxation reasons, and it eventually contained ten hamlets including Chinley, Buxworth and Brownside.

One of the first instances of industry was recorded at what would become Chapel Milton, which was noted in records from the late 13th century, the Kings Mill was reported by 1391 as a corn mill owned by the monarch, and this forming the placename. The Chapel prefix is a reference to the nearby town of Chapel-en-le-Frith, as the village had no local religious buildings. Forest wardens were living in Chinley and Buxworth before the 14th century to assist in upholding the law of the forest, but by this time the growing population had begun encroaching on the area, breaching laws by using land for farming, obtaining fuel and building houses. Although fines and other severe forms of punishment were at first routinely handed out to offenders, by the mid-17th century, enforcement had softened and locals instead being charged rent or taxed.

North-west Derbyshire is said to be ‘a vast extent of rough grazing’, with ‘short, cool summers, harsh winters and 60 inches of rain', and with a resulting landscape that sets hard expectations with what is achievable when farming. Up to the 16th century this was generally a mix of subsistence farming based on sheep, cattle, corn and oats. Due to this it was designated hunting forest, as well as forest rules slowing local development, until the time of the Industrial Revolution era, the area of Chinley, Buxworth and Brownside only contained dispersed farmsteads and scattered residences, the nearest settlements being at Chapel-en-le-Frith and Hayfield. Although there was an attempt near to Chinley in 1569 to enclose common land, this was opposed by locals violently with riots, with further disputes in the middle 1570s. The Duchy's herbage was subdivided in 1569 and the portions rented out to local farmers. Chinley eventually was enclosed by 1628. and the arrangement remaining for some centuries until the late 1800s when it was sold. By 1590 the Earl of Shrewsbury had purchased from Elizabeth I much of the Longendale estate surrounding Glossop village, and a map prepared showed the Chinley herbage surrounded by lands described as 'great waste' but which did contain some settled areas.

==== End of forest era, later industrial period ====
After the English Civil War during the middle 17th century with the monarchy's power much lessened, the status of much of the royal forests were abolished or largely reduced by 1635, along with the sale of much of the land within. John Speed's map of 1610 did not indicate any places contained within the present-day parish, but showed the remaining area of the Forest was much smaller, and then localised around the Peak Forest village. Hearth tax assessments of the time demonstrated the subsequent effect of this; between the start of the tax in 1662 and 1670 there were substantial increases, either due to rebuilding of houses larger and/or more housing overall. Those records also showed how sparsely populated the hamlets of Bowden Middlecale were, with Chinley, Buxworth and particularly Brownside amongst the lowest. These three were administratively grouped for poor rates purposes in 1713, predating the eventual 1894 civil parish. Burdett's map of Derbyshire in 1767 gave some insight into the state of the hamlets, with Chinley by this time taking some precedence with noted local areas including Chinley Houses, Chinley Churn and Chinley Head; (Chapel) Milton also, while Four Lane End was the then name of Chinley village. Brownside took in some of the scattered farms in the east and was later known as Breckhead, the wider eastern area also encompassing Over Fold/Upper Fold and Shireoaks hamlets alongside Wash village, which is on the east boundary of the parish and where properties span into the neighbouring Chapel-en-le-Frith parish. Many of these were built in the 17th to 18th century and were primarily farmhouses and agricultural buildings. Leaden Knowl also started to develop from the 18th century onwards as a dormitory settlement of Chinley.

Bugsworth Hall had been improved in 1627 by the Carrington family at Buxworth, although some of the fabric dated from earlier, and this spurred the development of a surrounding hamlet around it. By the 17th century some industry was in place, such as quarrying at Cracken Edge, Chinley Churn, Chinley Head and others for slate, limestone and sandstone. There were coal mining/bell pits on the surrounding moorland towards Buxworth. Much of this output was moved via packhorse. Additional local activities included handloom weaving and a woollen mill at Whitehall, south of Chinley. Because of the relatively undeveloped character of the area, there was some interest in improving communications due to the strides made elsewhere in the country because of the Industrial Revolution as well as exporting the produce, so turnpike roads were built, with a petition put to Parliament in March 1792 by "the Gentlemen, Clergy, Merchants, Principal Tradesmen, and Inhabitants, residing in or near the Towns of Chapel-en-le-Frith, Chapel Milltown, Chinley....", the subsequent Act enabling a road from Chapel en le Frith to Hayfield, which was built by 1795 and is numbered as the present-day A624. The first school in Buxworth was built with public subscription in 1826 by at Brierley Green, north of the Black Brook. The construction was carried out voluntarily by local farmers and quarrymen, it became a Congregationalists School and a Sunday School for the village. In 1902 a Congregational Chapel was built alongside the schoolroom. Another school was built in 1884. A school was rebuilt at New Smithy in 1834, its original date is unclear. St. James' Church School was constructed in 1878,

Further development included Buxworth becoming the terminus of the Peak Forest Canal which ran alongside Black Brook stream which was partly diverted in places to accommodate it, the canal stretched 14 miles (23 km) from Manchester. This was linked there to the Peak Forest Tramway which was an early horse-drawn railway, both designed by Benjamin Outram, and a major shareholding held by Samuel Oldknow. They opened in 1796 was and were primarily built to transport limestone 6 miles (9.7 km) away from the quarries at Dove Holes, the stone also being used to construct the canal. The Buxworth interchange became the busiest and largest inland canal port, but it was initially planned further downstream at Chapel Milton which was the closest practical location to getting narrowboats to these upland areas However, to avoid building locks at Whitehough, and on realising the water basin might not be guaranteed a good water supply and that a reservoir would have to be built at Wash village, which would incur additional expense, along with the discovery of gritstone deposits at Crist and Barren Clough which was en route curtailed these. The gritstone mine was further developed, becoming renowned for the anti-slip properties of the stone, creating additional income for the canal company. in 1928 it was closed after being worked out and used as landfill until the 1980s.

There were several historic industrial locations utilising the natural energy of the fast flowing Black Brook; Whitehall Mill was established around 1781, 1/2 mile (0.80 km) south west of Chinley and claimed during its time to making the largest rolls of paper in England. It later became a cotton mill, a dye plant, and further on manufacturing plastics, the site renamed Stephanie Works. Britannia Mill began as a cotton mill also on the brook, 1/2 mile (0.80 km) west of Buxworth, it was later used for gritstone milling and a factory manufacturing seats until a fire burned down the building in 2005, and in modern times is now an industrial estate. The Forge Mill site southeast of Chinley, is primarily in the adjoining Chapel en le Frith parish but auxiliary buildings were built across the boundary, it was a paper and later bleaching mill, before being redeveloped as a residential area. Bridgeholm Mill, immediately west of Chapel Milton in Bridgeholm Green was also for paper manufacture, and later for storage before becoming a small present-day industrial estate. The mills also took advantage of the tramway and canal, using them to move their output. The mill owners also built homes close by, White Hall is a country house south of Chinley, dating from the early nineteenth century and is built from gritstone ashlar, it is associated with its namesake paper mill, being formerly occupied by one of the owners of the mill. Carrington House, north west of Buxworth was built by the Britannia Mills owner in around the later 1800s, and later was associated to the Carringtons at the Bugsworth Hall estate.

From 1796 until 1830, the transportation of limestone had little competition, and a large area of storage sheds and lime kilns built up around the Buxworth end of the canal, becoming over time a 24-hour operation. By the 1830s, Chinley was a sizeable village with over 1000 inhabitants, several being involved in the various local industries. The Cromford and High Peak Railway reached nearby Whaley Bridge in 1833, connecting canals and providing an alternative route for transporting limestone from Buxworth, which to begin with supplemented the canal. This was later progressed upon by the Midland Railway and Manchester, Sheffield and Lincolnshire Railway linking up lines to create a route between London and Manchester, the former building their line from Buxton through to New Mills via the Great Rocks Line, and opening a station at Chinley by 1866-1867 via the Chapel Milton Viaduct and a tunnel north west of Buxworth, where another station was opened in 1867. The hamlet of New Smithy became known from a blacksmiths established there when the original one was displaced by the building of the chapel in Chapel Milton, and it was referenced in maps at the turn of the 18th century and later gazetteers, before the building of railways in the area. Another line, the Dore and Chinley Railway, with support from the Midland was opened from 1893 to 1894, connecting Sheffield and Manchester via a tri-junction and additional viaduct at Chapel Milton. The line through Chinley and Buxworth was widened to cope with this extra traffic, Chinley station was rebuilt and the Buxworth tunnel removed in favour of an embankment to accommodate this additional capacity.

==== Religion and non-conformist origins ====
Due to being in the hunting forest, there was no religious facilities directly within what would become the parish, and with Chapel-en-le-Frith and Hayfield being close by, as well as being in the parish of Glossop meant church goers in what was a sparse area until the 17th century were mainly catered for. However, there were factions which did not conform to the Act of Uniformity 1662; William Bagshaw, the then vicar of Glossop, amongst others who rebelled against the Act were deprived of their living and ministries. He established a congregation and regularly preached to them at nearby Malcoffe farm, just outside the parish. After Rev Bagshawe's death in 1702, the members of the church led by James Clegg started the work on finding a suitable area for building of a new worship place. In 1711, Chinley Independent Chapel (alternatively known as New Chapel) was constructed in Chapel Milton. Many of the non-conformists were subsequently embroiled in a local tithe court case of 1765-1766 involving a refusal to pay them which ruled in favour of landholders. Other independent and Wesleyan worship places were opened in primarily Buxworth and Chinley during the early and middle 19th and early 20th century, including a Primitive Methodist chapel, constructed in 1876 and a Congregational chapel erected at Brierley Green which opened in 1902. Anglican churches were also built in Buxworth (St James's) in 1874 and at Chinley (St Mary's) in 1908.

==== Railway inroads ====
By the 1860s, the railways started impacting the tramway and canal trade at Buxworth, where a substantial lime burning industry was processing the lime brought in. A decline in lime burning was taking place and the tramway transporting less limestone, primarily because of the railway more efficiently moving limestone from the quarries. Around 1870 the Midland Railway were erecting sidings within the quarry at Dove Holes and they began to take the output away faster and at cheaper costs than the tramway and canal. Additionally, the cross-country railway network enabled an easier way to import large quantities of coal directly to the quarries, and this restarted the lime-burning industry alongside, which had been taking place locally since around the mid-17th century and possibly in former centuries, being only possible due to the outcrops of local coal which became used up through the Industrial Revolution. Local limestone and lime traders were reorganised in 1891 into a single entity, Buxton Lime Firms Co Ltd (BLF) which was a grouping of 13 quarry owners working 17 limestone quarries, and included local operators of the New Road Kilns at Buxworth. In 1919 BLF was acquired by Brunner Mond & Co Ltd, who later merged with other businesses to form the corporate giant Imperial Chemical Industries (ICI) in 1927.

The Peak Forest Tramway and Canal was originally owned by the Peak Forest Canal Company, but in 1846 it was leased to the Sheffield, Ashton-under-Lyne and Manchester Railway, which merged with others on 1847 to become the Manchester, Sheffield and Lincolnshire Railway (MS&LR). The MS&LR were transporting large quantities of limestone and lime, and more often were bypassing the canal and tramway, which at this time it owned. The situation worsened until 1922 with the last use of the tramway, and in 1925 the successor railway company LNER, by now the owner was allowed by government order to wind down operations. The tramway tracks were dismantled and taken away for scrap, and the land of the route sold piecemeal to buyers. The canal and Buxworth basin was closed down and became derelict. The railways were however thriving during this period, with Chinley station particularly becoming increasingly a key station on the line, taking 11,000 passengers in 1892, and after becoming an interchange once the line to Sheffield was opened, usage accelerated to 29,000 in 1902, and 67,000 by 1922. Gowhole sidings were built in the far north west of the parish in 1902, becoming a key marshalling yard for the Midland until 1969. From the 1930s Chinley station began to be used by ramblers from Manchester and elsewhere, alighting to access the scenic environs within the parish and beyond.

==== Buxworth twinning and name change ====
Brierley Green adjoins Buxworth and is to the north of the Hope Valley railway line, in the early 19th century one of the cottages was the home of the Clayton family. The eldest son, Joel Henry Clayton, emigrated to Pittsburgh, Pennsylvania in the US from the late 1830s to live with an uncle and seek his fortune. Other Clayton family members followed him over the next few years and eventually they settled in the Diablo Valley at the foot of Mount Diablo, some 30 miles from San Francisco, The family prospered and Clayton became a successful businessman and landowner, and along with a business partner called Charles Rhine, they formed a new township. The decision to the name of the new settlement was based on the toss of a coin and Clayton rather than Rhinesville was the result, being officially founded in 1857. Clayton was officially twinned with Buxworth in 1996, a memorial plaque was installed on Clayton's birthplace, and a Buxworth themed exhibition was created at the Historical Museum in Clayton.

As a high-profile centre of the limestone trade, Buxworth was known by the 19th century as Bugsworth and from 1854 began to court with a new identity due to local apathy with the name. New names suggested included Lymedale, Limedale, Dalesworth, Green Valley, Bucksworth but none of these really captured the villagers' attentions. By 1914 the general feeling seemed to be coming to a consensus, even local bookmakers were in on it with some favourable odds on Lymedale. The parish council agreed to having local voters decide in September 1914, but by then World War I had begun and it did not take place, the question again coming to a head 15 years later in 1929, the new push being promoted by the local vicar, Reverend Dr J R Towers and the village schoolmaster W T Prescott, although dissenting opinion came from the adjoining parish of Chapel-en-le Frith, which contained part of the village and wanted to retain the original name. The referendum finally taken, the decision being in favour of Buxworth which was formally changed by Derbyshire County Council in 1935. Certain local landmarks followed suit, such as the train station, but others retained their pre-change titles or used them interchangeably, such as Bugsworth Hall, along with the canal basin and the war memorial hall.

==== Canal restoration and modern developments ====
The Buxworth canal site from 1927 when it was formally closed by the LNER, remained mainly unused through nationalisation of much of the canal network in 1948, and despite official attitudes which often saw the canals only as commercial highways, there was some growing recognition of using them for leisure purposes. It stayed derelict until 1968 when the Inland Waterways Protection Society (IWPS) obtained permission from British Waterways to restore the basin. In 1975, the basin was re-watered and boats passed into it for the first time in more than 30 years. However, the canal was found to be leaking and it had to be drained shortly afterwards. There were further aborted attempts to allow boats in 1982 and 1999 before geological studies were done which enabled it to reopen permanently in 2005. Following this, the IWPS rededicated their aims towards upkeep and improvement under the new name of the Bugsworth Basin Heritage Trust (BBHT). A stretch of the tramway from the basin was converted into a walking trail in 1998 becoming the Peak Forest Tramway Trail. In September 2022 after nearly 75 years, BBHT handed back management of the basin to the Canal and River Trust.

High Peak Isolation hospital or the High Peak Hospital for Infectious Diseases, north west of Chapel Milton on the present A624 Hayfield Road was opened in May 1902 and was in use over 40 years before becoming little used with the inception of the NHS. It was then used by the Chapel-en-le-Frith rural council and in use as headquarters from 1953 to 1954, then were offices of the High Peak Borough Council and it also housed Chinley Register Office, until 2018 when the buildings were converted into offices housing the High Peak Business Park. There had been discussion in government as far back as 1934 for a road to ease congestion through the town of Chapel-en-le-Frith, the A6 road at the time went from Buxton to Whaley Bridge via Fernilee, circling around the west of the parish. The Chapel-en-le-Frith bypass road was finally built through Buxworth between 1984 and 1987 and numbered the A6, the old A6 being renumbered as the A5004. In 1969, Pat Phoenix, actress in the long-running television serial drama Coronation Street, became the licensee of the Navigation Hotel, and while a co-star Joan Francis (playing Dot Greenhalgh in the series) assisted as bar staff.

Chinley station was in a period of growth before the turn of the 20th century, and Buxworth station being less than a mile away inevitably suffered although it was close to the village and Brierley Green, ended up taking mainly local rail traffic while Chinley handled the long distance trains. After World War II, both stations' ticket receipts fell substantially, but Buxworth particularly was described as 'unremunerative' and after little improvement, closed in 1958. The line between Buxton and Matlock was closed to passengers from 1967, further impacting numbers. Since then, with Chinley becoming a commuter suburb for Manchester has seen numbers grow to 60,000 rail users in 2004 and over 120,000 by 2016. The redundant Buxworth station was purchased for just over £1,000 by the Manchester-based Burnage Academy for Boys in 1969, to be used as an outdoor activity base, which was opened by the Duke of Devonshire in July 1973. More growth was evident with the Whaley Bridge water treatment works built in 1912 adjacent to Furness Vale, straddling the parish boundary to the west.

The upper areas of the Peak District have seen a number of aircraft involved in accidents due to the high ground, inclement weather and visibility at times. An Airspeed Oxford Mk I from RAF Seighford crashed on Brown Knoll in December 1945 while on a map reading training exercise. The three aircrew survived with injuries. A rail accident between Chinley and New Smithy in March 1986 involving a passenger train colliding with a freight train caused a derailment, one driver was killed and 32 passengers were taken to hospital. In the late 1990s, locals began to campaign for reverting to Buxworth's original name, spurred in part by the then canal renovations and the area still continuing to be known as Bugsworth Basin. In 1999 High Peak Borough Council arranged for a referendum, with the result being to keep the modern name. Rec Rocks was an annual music festival run during 2014-2017 from Clough Head farm north of Buxworth, raising money for various local charitable efforts. The area of the parish was increased in 2008, with the portion of Buxworth village south of the Black Brook to Eccles Road was transferred from Chapel-en-le-Frith parish after local consultation. Chinley railway station in 2018 celebrated 150 years of existence with the unveiling of a plaque and new noticeboard. A new £1.4 million community centre to replace the existing Chinley building, which was built in the 1960s, was formally approved by the High Peak district council planning team in 2022, and opened in April 2025.

== Governance ==
=== Local bodies ===
Chinley, Buxworth and Brownside parish is managed at the first level of public administration through a parish council.

At district level, the wider area is overseen by High Peak Borough council. Derbyshire County Council provides the highest level strategic services locally.

=== Electoral representation ===
For electoral purposes, the parish is wholly in Blackbrook ward of the High Peak district, in the Whaley Bridge electoral division for Derbyshire county elections, and within the High Peak parliamentary constituency.

== Demographics ==
=== Population ===
There are 2,794 residents recorded in total within Chinley, Buxworth and Brownside parish for the 2021 census, a minimal reduction from the 2,796 residents recorded for the 2011 census, which itself was an increase from 2,647 (6%) of the 2001 census. The population majority is mainly working age adults, with the 18–64 years age bracket taking up 63%. Infants to teenage years are another sizeable grouping of around 18%, with elderly residents (65 years and older) making up a similar number (19%) of the parish population.

=== Labour market ===
In reports for the 2011 census, a substantial number of 18 years old locals and above are in some way performing regular work, with 74% classed as economically active. 10% are economically inactive, and 16% are reported as retired. A majority of residents' occupations are in skilled trades, professional and managers, directors and seniors.

=== Housing and mobility ===
2011 statistics record over 1,200 residences exist throughout the parish, primarily at Chinley, the largest settlement. The majority of housing stock is of the fully detached type, semi detached or terraced. The vast majority of these (>900) are owner occupied, with other tenure including social and private rentals. During the 2011 census, the majority of households (90%) reported having the use of a car or van.

== Economy ==
=== Historic ===
Although highly rural which encouraged much land use historically for agriculture and pastoral farming, there is little evidence found of how the land was used prior to the Norman Conquest, which saw the wider area used as a royal hunting forest. Despite that restriction, some land was granted away and other areas given to small tenants in the following centuries. Other local industry during that period included some quarrying, with slate workings at Cracken Edge alongside Chinley Churn and smaller, later locations such as limestone at Crist and Barren Clough and sandstone along Hayfield Road. Coal mining look place to the west of the Churn area, from the 1700s into the 19th century. A number of mills were based on the Black Brook. As for labour in the middle 1800s, reported occupations included schoolmasters, mason, paper manufacturer, spinning and blacksmiths.

=== Present ===
There are several business types throughout the area mainly based at mill buildings and farm areas which reuse agricultural buildings and storage facilities, including plastics manufacturing, metal fabrication, pet bereavement services and pet care, holiday accommodation, stonemasons, medical research and a water treatment facility. In Chinley there are some nucleated retail areas for small businesses, primarily along Lower Lane, with others on Green Lane. They cater to the local population with business types such as various food offerings, convenience store, postal services and home furnishings. There are public houses at Chinley, Bugsworth Basin and Chinley Head.

== Education ==
There are two primary schools at Chinley to the east of the village, Chinley Primary and Peak School.

There is a primary school at Buxworth village.

== Community and leisure ==
=== Amenities ===
The parish has a number of publicly accessible facilities and commercial business activities.

There is a community centre and Women's Institute building, both at Chinley.

Shopping options and services at Chinley include a post office, launderette, deli, restaurant, salon, pharmacy, hypnotherapist and a newsagents/convenience shop. Some of the shops are within a restored arcade.

With the parish only containing villages, the nearby towns of Chapel-en-le-Frith and Whaley Bridge are accessed by residents for larger or weekly shopping items, petrol stations, secondary school education and markets.

There are two allotment sites, at Chinley and Buxworth, opened in 2011.

=== Recreation ===
These include Chinley Sports Ground, which has two grassed football pitches at Chinley, and a recreation ground is at Buxworth. Both have children's playgrounds, there are also cycle & skatepark facilities at Chinley. Chinley Park Local Nature Reserve, is off Stubbins Lane. Neighbourhood allotment sites are at both Chinley and Buxworth. Squirrel Green which was previously a bowling green, is in the centre of Chinley.

=== Community groups ===
These include a village cinema, yoga and pilates groups, Brownies and Girl Guides, young people, over-60s, parents and toddlers, community swimming sessions at Peak School, football, cricket, netball, table tennis, running, cycling, Chinley & Buxworth Community Association, allotment associations, Women's Institute, Chinley scout group, Friends of Chinley Park, Bugsworth Basin Heritage Trust, Chinley and Buxworth Transport Group, chess club, bridge club, toddler group, church groups, craft club, book swap / drop and exercise classes.

=== Events ===
These include the Chinley Summer Fete, Chinley Christmas Market, well dressing in Buxworth, Buxworth Olympics and Buxworth Steam Weekend.

There are annual spring and summer running events, the Eccles Pike Fell Race which is a fell running event from Buxworth to Eccles Pike and back with a length of 3.4 miles (5.5 km) and climb of 1,001 feet (305 m), and the Buxworth 5 Road Race from Buxworth to Whitehough and back, length of 5 miles (8.0 km) and climb of 988 feet (301 m).

=== Tourism ===
Approximately half of the parish is within the Peak District National Park, at the western edge of the Dark Peak landscape area, the station facilitating access to ramblers and walkers. Peak Forest Tramway Trail and Bugsworth Basin are also local attractions, accessed both by foot and pleasure craft. Chinley has a camping area south of New Smithy village.

==== National Trail ====
National Trails are long distance footpaths and bridleways in England and Wales. They are administered by Natural England. The Pennine Bridleway is 205 miles (330 km) long, from Peak Forest village it enters the parish via The Roych area, and follows an old packhorse route to South Head before continuing onto Hayfield and beyond.

==== Cycling ====
Route 68 of the National Cycle Network is also known as the Pennine Cycleway, and it crosses from the west to the north west of the parish through Buxworth and Brierley Green.

== Landmarks ==
=== Conservation ===
==== Structural protections ====
===== Listed buildings =====
There are 31 items of architectural merit throughout the parish, mainly with statutory Grade II listed status. Chinley Independent Chapel at Chapel Milton has a higher designation of Grade II*, the rest are several farmhouses and some associated buildings such as barns, along with the 19th-century built Buxworth Anglican church.

===== Scheduled monuments =====
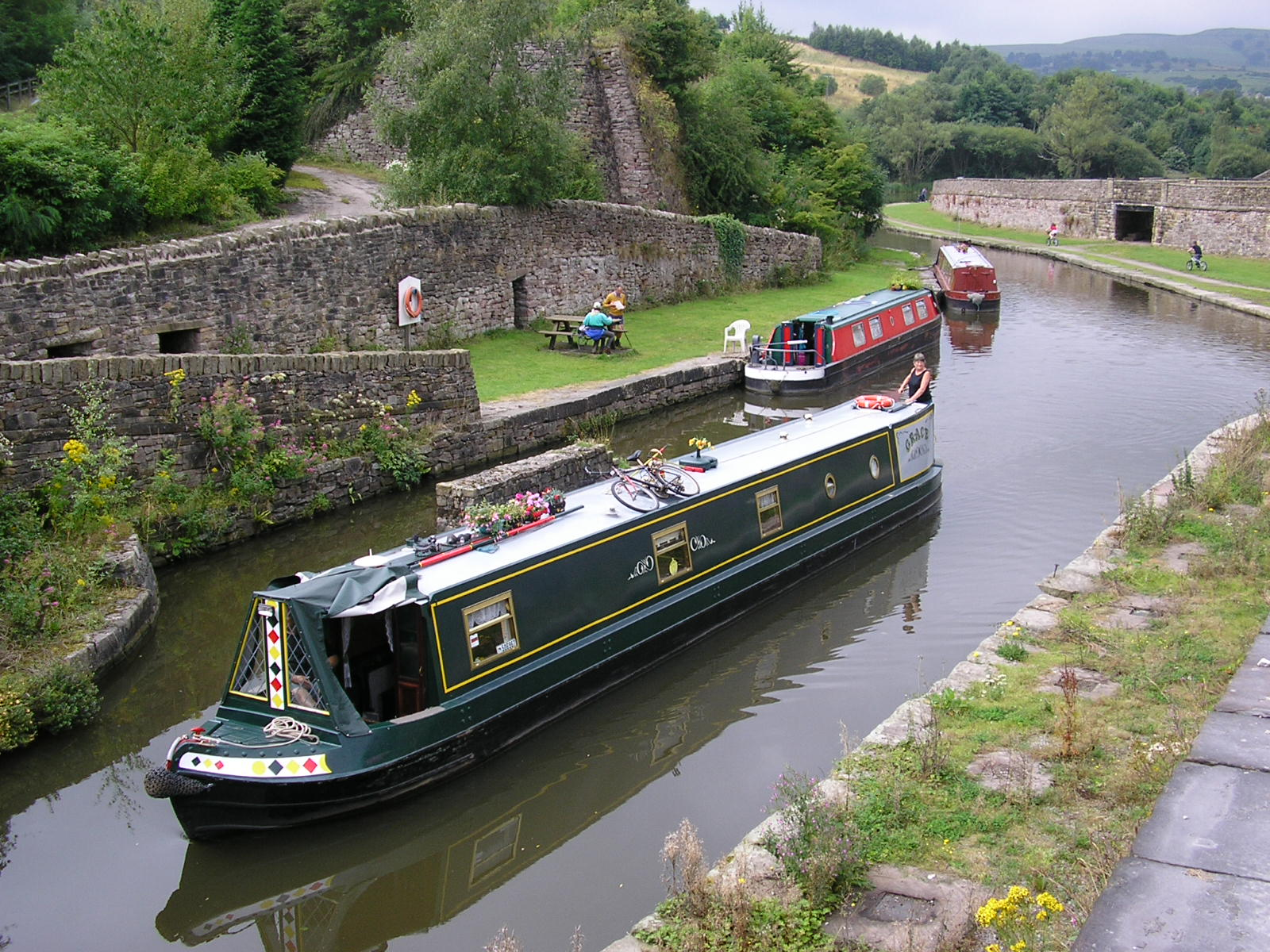
Bugsworth Basin

There is only one example of a protected historic monument, which spans several local features - Bugsworth canal basin at Buxworth, with remains of the Peak Forest Tramway, along with a quarry north of Buxworth and remaining limekilns. Although the village was later renamed, the basin retained its legacy title.

==== Environmental designations ====
===== National park =====
A portion of the upland area in the parish is contained within the Peak District national park, north of Buxworth and New Smithy villages. It encompasses a section of Wash village to the east and some Victorian residences along the northern outskirts of Chinley.

===== Green belt =====
The western portion of the parish not already in the Peak District National Park, except for the immediate built up areas of Chinley and Buxworth and the open land south of the A6 road, are within the North West Derbyshire green belt, which is a component of the Liverpool, Manchester, West and South Yorkshire (North West) green belt.

===== 'Freedom to roam' =====
Much of the upland east of the Pennine Bridleway National Trail is defined as open access land which is privately held by landowners but publicly accessible, up to Brown Knoll and beyond.

===== Conservation areas =====
These are at Buxworth, Chapel Milton, Chinley, Leaden Knowl and Wash, adding additional developmental protections to the core of those villages.

===== Site of Special Scientific Interest (SSSI) =====
The far east of the parish surrounding the Brown Knoll hill lies within the Dark Peak SSSI.

===== Local Nature Reserve =====
Stubbins Park, to the immediate west of Chinley village is the only nature reserve within the parish, and is approximately 1.77 hectares (4.4 acres) in area. It is alternatively known locally as Chinley Park Nature Reserve.

=== War memorials ===
There are a number of monument items throughout the parish commemorating local personnel who served in the World War I and WWII conflicts:

- There is a WWI war memorial club hall at Buxworth
- Chinley Park (also known as Stubbins Park Local Nature Reserve) is a war memorial park on Stubbins Lane, with a plaque
- A memorial cross in the graveyard of Chinley Independent Chapel, Chapel Milton
- An obelisk at White Knowle Chapel graveyard
- A cross at Church of St James, Buxworth
- A plaque at Church of St Mary, Chinley
- There is an informal plaque located at the birthplace of Jack Marriott in New Smithy village, who was a flight engineer in 617 Squadron during the Operation Chastise dambusters raid.

== Transport ==
=== Bus services ===
Chinley, Buxworth, Brierley Green, Chapel Milton, Leaden Knowl, New Smithy and the Rosey Bank housing development are catered to with public transport services. The 190 bus route runs between Buxton and Whaley Bridge. There are 6 buses in both directions between Monday to Friday, and 5 services on Saturdays. There are no buses on Sundays. There is also a school bus catering to the local primary and Chapel-en-le-Frith secondary school.

=== Railway station ===
Chinley railway station maintains regular stopping services to Manchester and Sheffield. There are also some direct services westwards, such as to Stockport, Warrington and Liverpool, and eastwards, including Chesterfield, Nottingham, Grantham, Peterborough and Norwich

== Religious sites ==
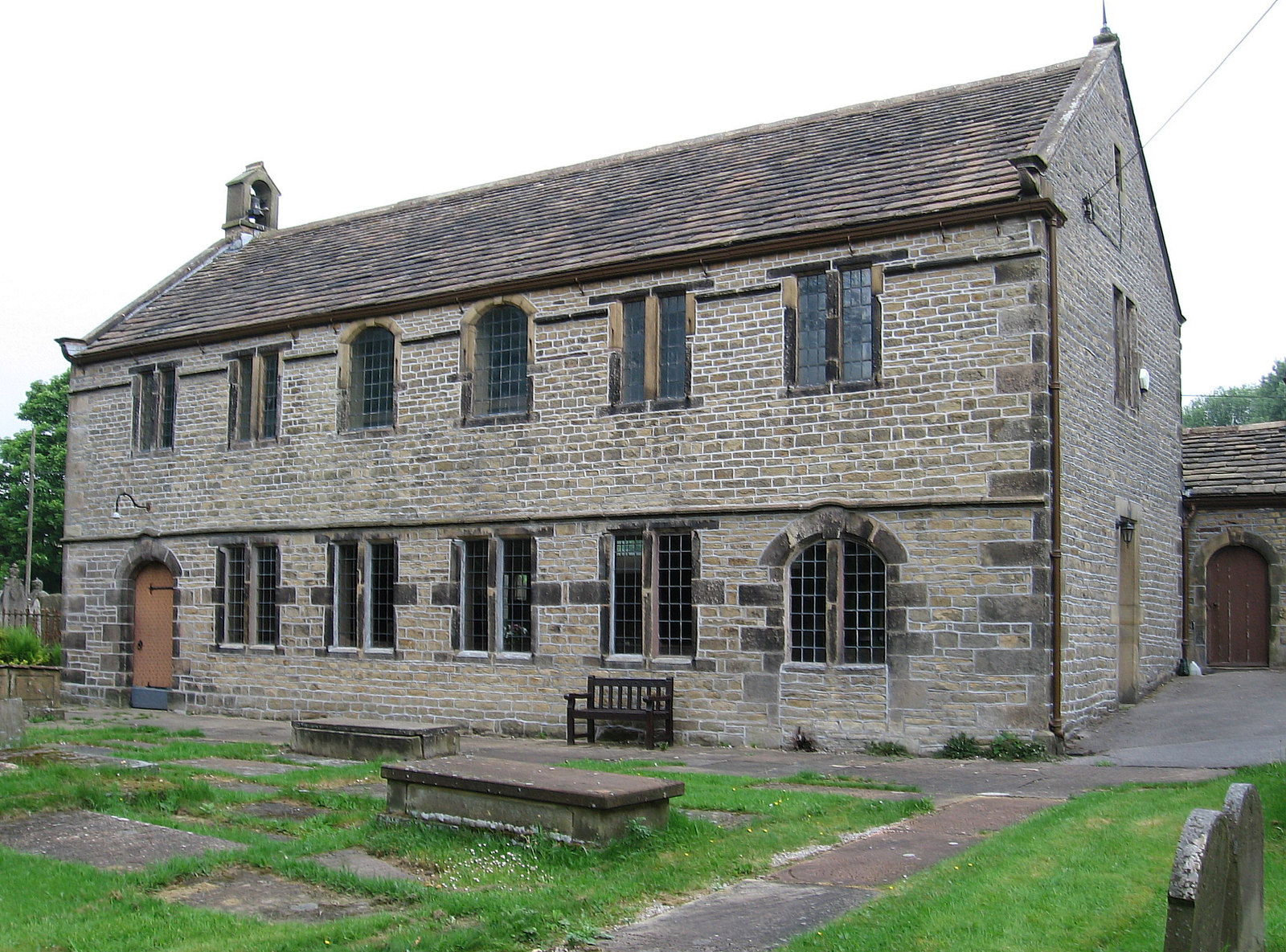
Chinley Independent Chapel

There are two Anglican places of worship, St Mary's at Chinley and St James's at Buxworth. Chinley Independent Chapel was an early local centre for non-conformists and is based in Chapel Milton. At Brierley Green there is a Congregational Church.

== Notable people ==
- James Clegg (1679–1755), local minister and author
- John Bennet (1714–1759), preacher, resident of Chinley
- Ralph Harrison (1748–1810), nonconformist minister, born in Chinley
- Joel Henry Clayton (1812–1872), US entrepreneur, born in Brierley Green
- Judson Sykes Bury (1852–1944), physician and surgeon, resident of Chinley
- Alma Howard (1913–1984), radiobiologist, resident of Chinley
- John Thoday (1916–2008), geneticist, born in Chinley
- Jack Marriott (1920–1943), member of 617 Squadron, participant in the WWII Operation Chastise dambusters raid, resident of New Smithy
- Pat Phoenix (1923–1986), actress, former owner of the Navigation Inn public house at Buxworth
- Mike Stevenson (1927–1994), journalist and cricketer, born in Chinley
- Alan Hill (born 1950), cricketer and umpire, born in Buxworth
- Tony Marchington (1955–2011), biotechnology entrepreneur and businessman, resident at Buxworth

== Sport ==
Buxworth Cricket Club play in the Derbyshire & Cheshire Cricket League.

Buxworth Football Club play in the Hope Valley Amateur League of the Derbyshire Football Association.
