= A624 road =

Road in England

A624

Route information
- Maintained by Derbyshire County Council / Highways Agency
- Length: 9.0 mi (14.5 km)

Major junctions
- North end: A57 in Glossop
- A6016; A6015; B6062
- South end: B5470 in Town End, Chapel-en-le-Frith

Location
- Country: United Kingdom
- Primary destinations: Glossop; Buxton (A6)

Road network
- Roads in the United Kingdom; Motorways; A and B road zones

The A624 road is a main road in the English county of Derbyshire. It connects Glossop to Chapel-en-le-Frith passing through Chunal, Hayfield, and New Smithy.

== Route (north to south) ==
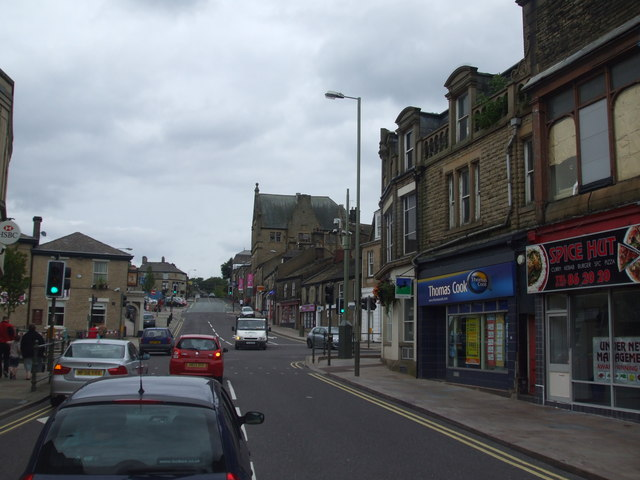
The very top of the trunk road in Glossop by Norfolk Square.

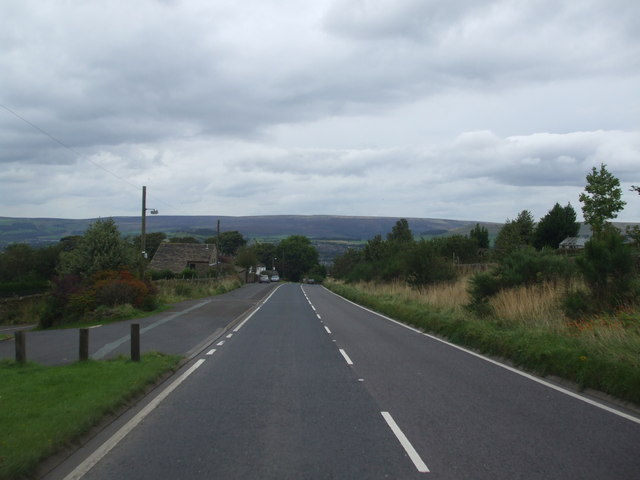
The road passing through Chunal

The road begins at the crossroads next to Norfolk Square in central Glossop consisting of the A57 High Street East and West, the B6105 northbound and the A624 southbound. It moves through Charlestown and on up Chunal hill, past the old Grouse Inn (now closed) and the Monk's Road turning. Down the other side it passes under Lantern Pike, through Little Hayfield, before going through Hayfield on a relief flyover, passing the junction with the A6015. It continues southwards, climbing to Peep o' Day farm before descending to a TOTSO junction in the hamlet of New Smithy, beyond which the route is mainly through built-up areas. It passes under the twin Chapel Milton railway viaduct before crossing Black Brook and running down Hayfield Road and finishing at Town End in Chapel-en-le-Frith.

Some parts of the route parallel the A6, especially near Chinley and Chapel. Local bus routes 61, 62, 64 and 69 use the road as a transportation corridor; there are many bus stops along the route.

== History and improvements ==
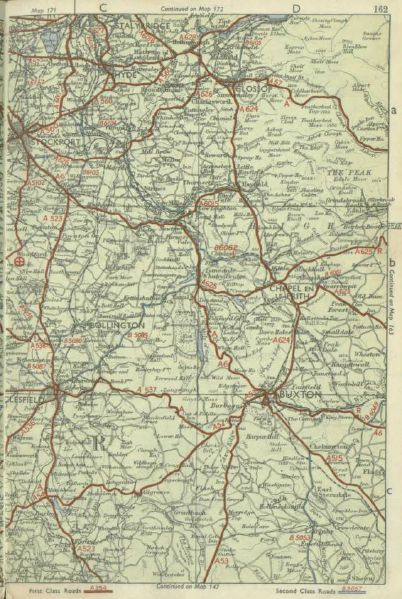
Early 1950s pre-motorway map showing the old routes of local roads including the A624

The former path of the A624 followed some segments of the modern-day A6 in between Chapel-en-le-Frith and Buxton. What is now the A5004, but used to be part of the A6, had steep gradients and large amounts of traffic and became unsuitable. The A624 was cut to its present extent as an alternative to the choked-up former A6. The A6 was then moved to the route previously occupied by the A624 to Buxton from Chapel-en-le-Frith. The need for traffic to move through each town was then removed when a bypass was constructed for Whaley Bridge and Chapel (now the A6).
