= New Smithy =

Hamlet in Derbyshire, England

Coordinates: 53.339408°N 1.922671°W

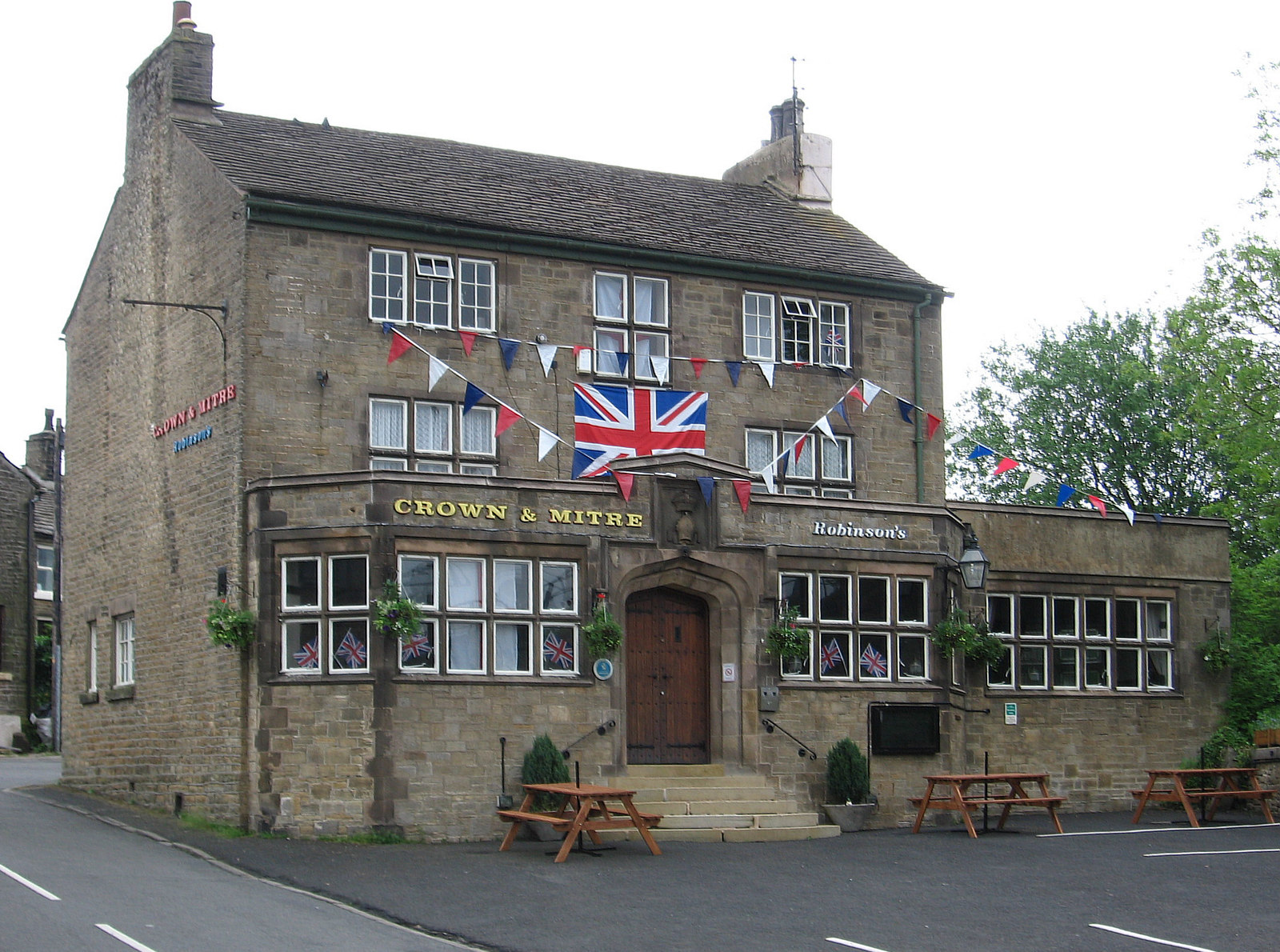
- The Crown & Mitre

- Location within Derbyshire
- OS grid reference: SK 0525 8250
- Civil parish: Chinley, Buxworth and Brownside
- District: High Peak
- Shire county: Derbyshire
- Region: East Midlands
- Country: England
- Sovereign state: United Kingdom
- Post town: STOCKPORT
- Postcode district: SK23 6DZ
- Dialling code: 01663
- Police: Derbyshire
- Fire: Derbyshire
- Ambulance: East Midlands
- UK Parliament: High Peak

New Smithy is a hamlet in the civil parish of Chinley, Buxworth and Brownside, Derbyshire, England, near the village of Chinley. It sits on the A624 trunk road from Glossop to Chapel-en-le-Frith featuring a TOTSO where left carries one down to Chapel and right heads to Chinley. There is a railway bridge over the turning, used for both freight and passengers, on the Hope Valley Line to Sheffield and Manchester; very close down the line is Chinley railway station. Next to this the Crown & Mitre pub, now converted into residential flats, is the main landmark and there are a couple of residential housing streets and terraces, and one or two businesses.

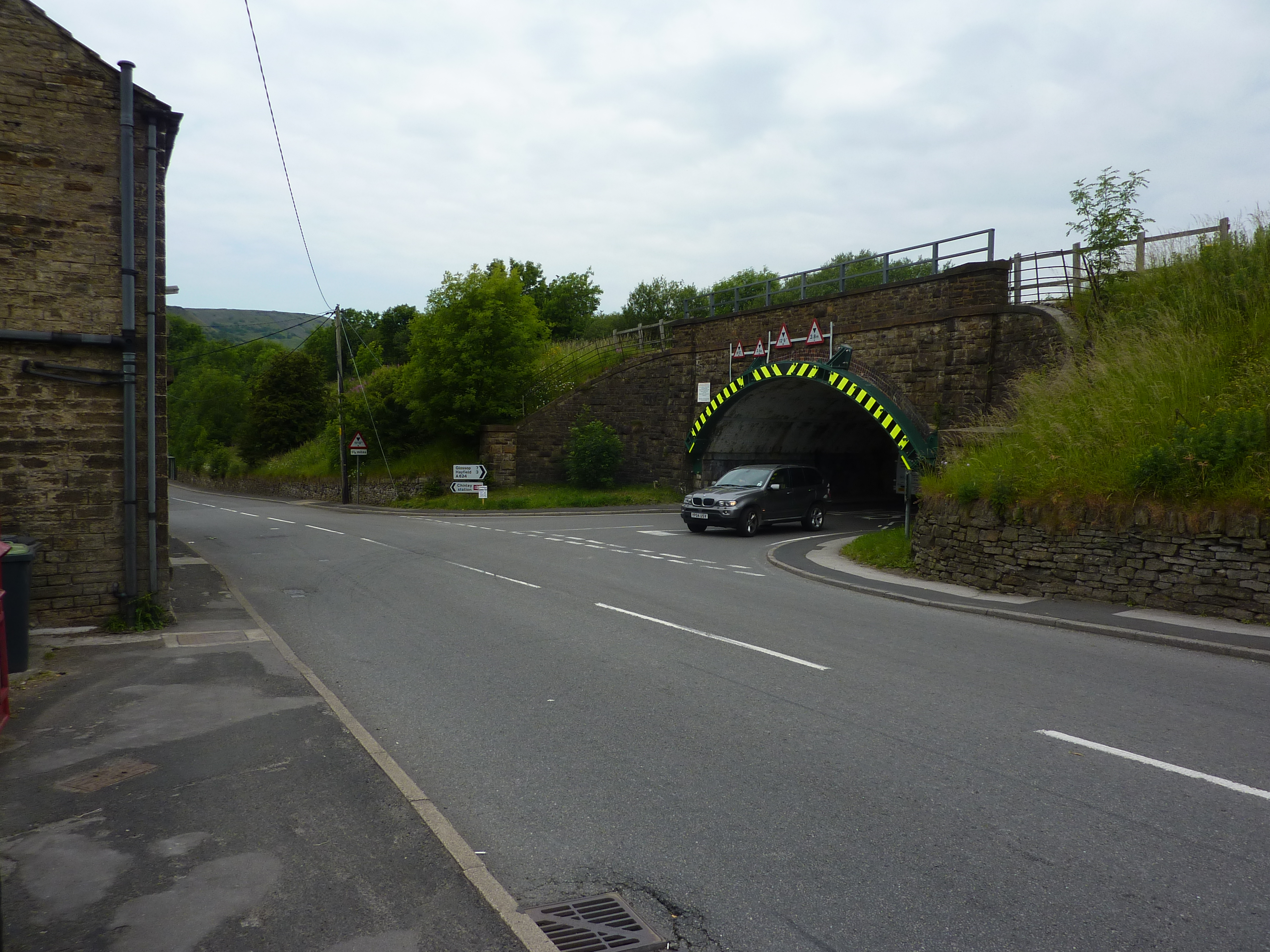
The TOTSO railway bridge at New Smithy

Its name comes from the construction of the twin Chapel Milton Viaducts nearby; horses were used during the construction and were shod here (a smithy is a blacksmith's forge). The hamlet has an industrial past, along with the neighbouring village of Hayfield. New Smithy's Maynestone Mill was finally demolished in 1946, almost 500 years after it was opened in 1452.

New Smithy is in a hilly area (being in the Peak District); geographical features include Bole Hill, Mount Famine, South Head, Eccles Pike, Mag Low, Chinley Churn, the River Sett and Combs Reservoir.
