= Eccles Pike Fell Race =

English fell race

- Date: August
- Location: Buxworth, England
- Event type: Fell race
- Distance: 3.4 mi (5.5 km)
- Established: pre-1910
- Course records: 21:28 (William Longden); 23:32 (Martha Tibbot)
- Website: goytvalleystriders.org.uk/races/eccles/

Eccles Pike Fell Race is a fell race run from Buxworth, Derbyshire to the top of Eccles Pike, then back again. The course is 3.4 mi (5.5 km) long with 901 ft (275 m) ascent, and is renowned for being short and demanding. It has been run intermittently since 1910, and perhaps earlier.

== History ==
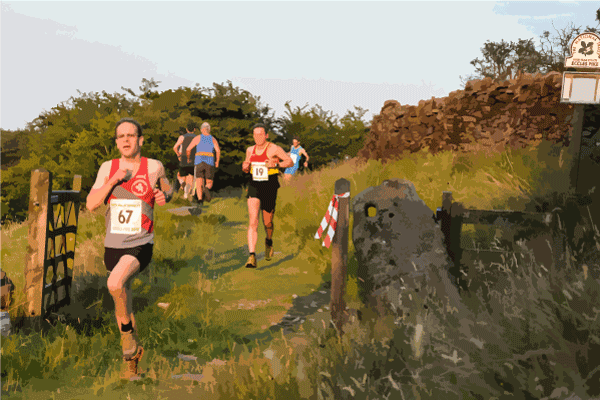

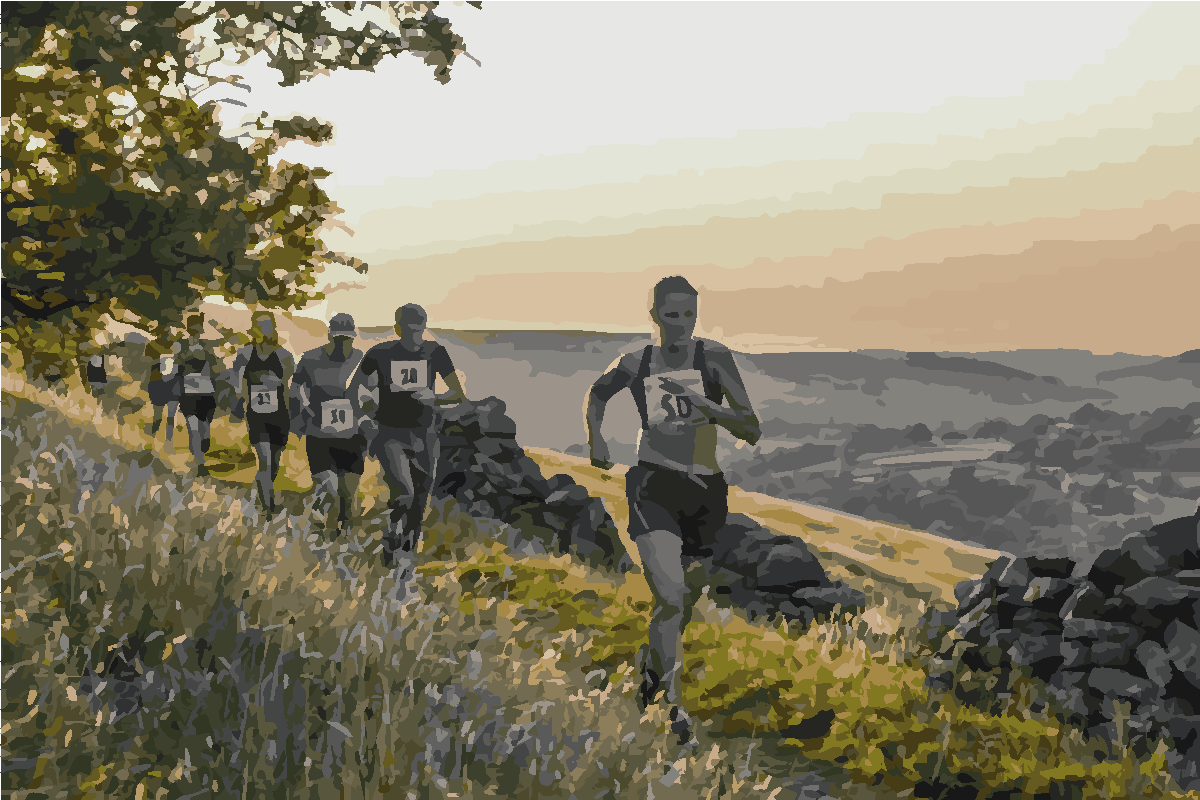

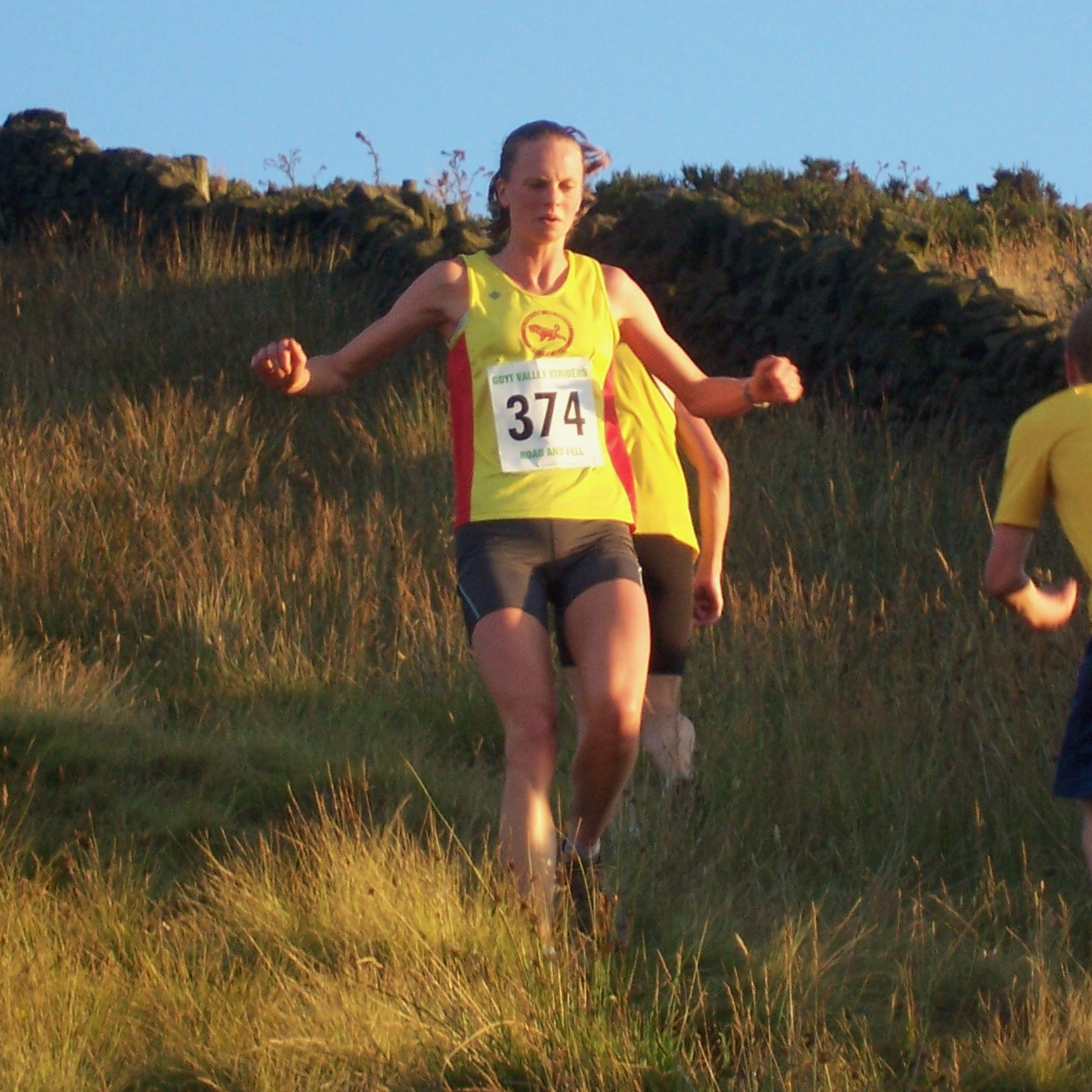
Olivia Bush setting a women's record in 2011

GVS have organised the race since 1995

This race is reputed to be one of the oldest established fell races in the country, which probably accounts for the fact that it is short and sharp, basically a run straight to the top of a hill and back down.

— Bill Smith

Eccles Pike is one of the oldest fell races in the country, and has a history going back over 100 years. Its start date is not known, but from 1910 a small cup was awarded to the winner, and the race venue would alternate between the nearby villages of Chinley and Buxworth each year. In the 1920s, the race became part of the Summer Garden Fete each June, and a larger silver cup was presented to the winner. The cup was first won in 1928 by Pat Campbell, the international steeplechaser from nearby Chapel-en-le-Frith; he went on to win the race three years in succession.

The original race series ended in 1937, but was revived in 1969 by the local church committee, and has been held most years since. The 1980 race saw John Wild set the course record of 18:14. Over the years the race has attracted several great names of fell running, with other winners including Ron Hill and Ricky Wilde.

There used to be separate ladies and junior races held on the same day, but now all athletes run together. The winner of the race is still presented with the 1928 cup, whilst the best junior receives the smaller 1910 cup. Since 1995, the race has been organised by local running club Goyt Valley Striders, and it takes place in Buxworth on the second Wednesday evening in August.

== Results ==
Since the course was last changed in 2009, the best men's time is 21:28 by William Longden in 2024. The best women's time is 23:32 by Martha Tibbot in 2024. The fastest recorded time on any version of the course is 18:14 by John Wild in 1980.

Year	Men	Time	Women	Time
2026	Henry Webb	22:03	Katie Walshaw	26:07
2025	Mark Jones	22:20	Hollie Wall	27:28
2024	William Longden	21:28	Martha Tibbot	23:32
2023	William Longden	22:11	Harriet Wingfield	25:29
2022	William Longden	22:38	Lucy Bednall	28:03
2021	Andrew Heyes	21:58	Lucy Bednall	28:33
2020	COVID-19 pandemic			
2019	William Longden	23:41	Lucy Bednall	28:17
2018	Nicholas Barber	23:30	Caitlin Rice	26:36
2017	Alasdair Campbell	23:28	Lauren McNeil	27:24
2016	Matt Elkington	22:40	Gwyneth Parry	27:29
2015	Robert Little	23:14	Hannah Brown	26:38
2014	Robert Little	23:08	Caitlin Rice	26:16
2013	Tom Bush	24:06	Caitlin Rice	26:55
2012	Jack Ross	22:43	Sandra Lewis	29:09
2011	Jack Ross	22:32	Olivia Bush	24:53
2010	Simon Coldrick	23:11	Emma Wilson	25:50
2009	Lloyd Taggart	22:38	Liz Batt	28:08
2008	Danny Hope	21:17	Clare Parker	26:47
2007	Phil Winskill	21:42	Lisa Lacon	26:21
2006	Lloyd Taggart	20:31	Jackie Lee	25:54
2005	Andi Jones	19:59	Estelle Maguire	27:34
2004	Andrew Jack Ellis	23:11	Jenny Caddick	31:54
2003	Lloyd Taggart	20:11	Naomi Greaves	26:15
2002	Malcolm Fowler	21:23	Jane Mellor	28:00
2001	Malcolm Fowler	21:16	Naomi Greaves	29:06
2000	Malcolm Fowler	20:44	Estelle McGuire	26:06
1999	Tim Austin	21:46	Elizabeth Batt	25:28
1998	Lloyd Taggart	20:53	Sheryl Reason	26:23
1997	Paul Deaville	22:20	Michaela Zazzi	27:38
1996	Andy Wilton	19:26	Kath Harvey	27:34
1995	Andy Wilton	19:47	Kath Harvey	26:26
1994	Andy Trigg	20:30	Sally Newman	25:12
1991–1993	not held			
1990	Rob Jackson	20:41	S Boam	24:35
1989	Rob Jackson	20:27	K Martin	26:15
1988	Rob Jackson	20:44	A Jones	24:31
1987	Bashir Hussain	20:08	S Reason; J Newton	
1986	Robin Bergstrand	19:15	Carol Haigh	21:30
1985	Bashir Hussain	19:58	K Whittle	24:59
1984	Paul Roden	19:56	Jane Spence	26:04
1983	Jeff Norman	19:50	Julie Holland	23:12
1982	Alan Sladen	20:46		
1981	Alan Sladen	20:05		
1980	John Wild	18:14	Gillian Pile	25:10
1979	Andrew Wilton	19:14	Jayne Dransfield	25:35
1978	Andrew Wilton	19:24	Miriam Rosen	29:21
1977	Colin Robinson	20:05	Brenda Robinson	26:07
1976	Ron Hill			
1975	M. Green			
1972–1974	not held			
1971	Ricky Wilde			
1970	Ricky Wilde			
1969	B. Ellis			
1938–1968	not held			
1937	R. Walton			
1934–1936	results unknown			
1933	D. Mason			
1932	C. Jepson			
1931	E. Barnes			
1930	Pat Campbell			
1929	Pat Campbell			
1928	Pat Campbell			
1910–1927	results unknown			
