= James Clegg =

James Clegg may refer to:

- James Clegg (minister) (1679–1755), English Presbyterian minister and author
- James S. Clegg (1933–2024), professor of biochemistry at University of California, Davis
- James Clegg (swimmer) (born 1994), British Paralympic swimmer
