= Britland Edge Hill =

Hill in the Peak District, England

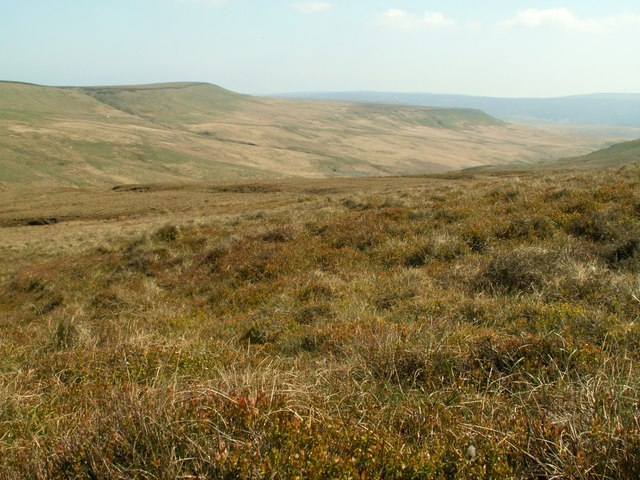
- View of Britland Edge Hill (l) and Dewhill Naze (r) from Tooleyshaw Moor

Highest point
- Elevation: 523 m (1,716 ft)
- Prominence: ca. 20 m
- Parent peak: Upper Heyden
- Listing: none
- Coordinates: 53.5188°N 1.84162°W

Geography
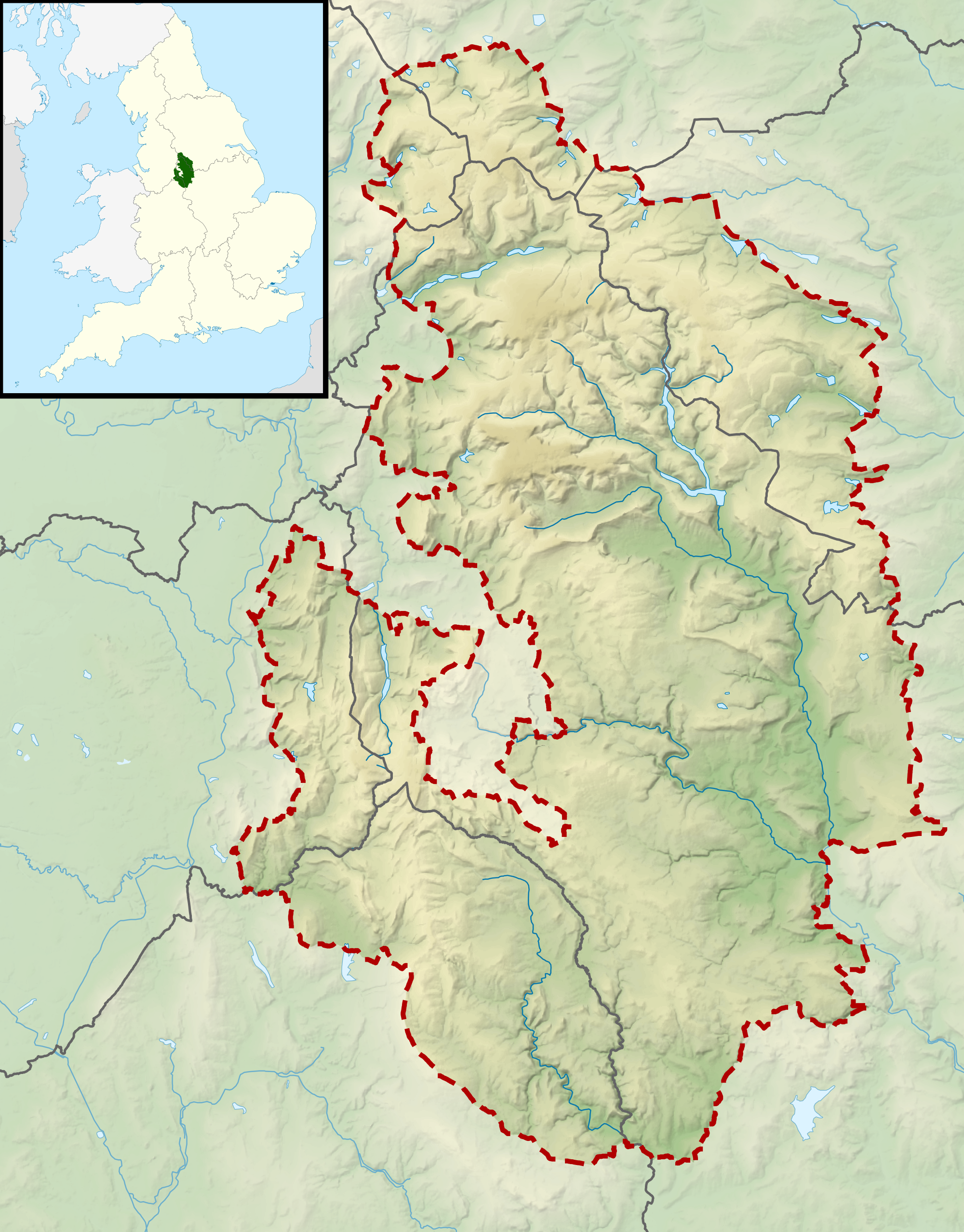
- Location within the Peak District Location within Derbyshire
- Location: Derbyshire, England, UK
- Parent range: Peak District
- OS grid: SE106027
- Topo map: OS Landranger 110; OL1W

Britland Edge Hill is a hill, 523 metres (1,716 ft) high, in the Peak District in England. It is located on the border of Derbyshire and West Yorkshire.

== Description ==
Britland Edge Hill is a prominent hill in the northern Peak District between the towns of Glossop and Holmfirth. It rises east of the A6024. To the south it descends to a prominent spur, known as Dewhill Naze, which in turn drops steeply into the valley of the Heyden Brook and Woodhead Reservoir. The hill, like most of the surrounding area is bare and open. There are no footpaths to the top, but there is a car park about 1.5 km to the north-northwest, where the A6024 crosses the adjoining ridge of Upper Heyden.
