= Hollins Hill =

Hill in the Derbyshire Peak District

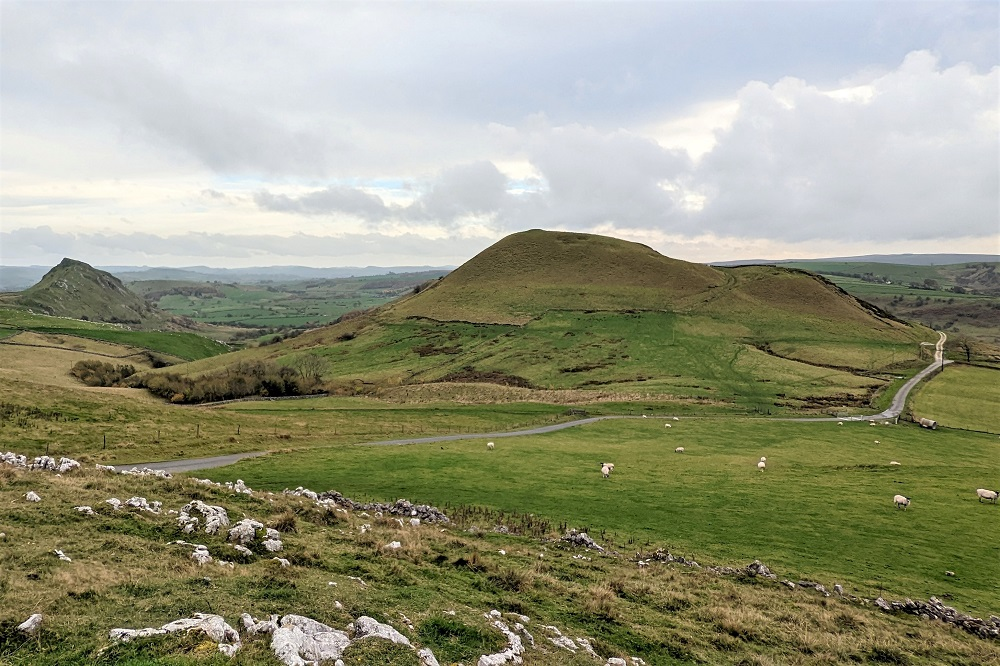
- View from north with Chrome Hill on the left

Highest point
- Elevation: 450 metres (1,476 ft)
- Prominence: 62 metres (203 ft)
- Coordinates: 53°12′29″N 1°54′40″W

Geography
- Location: Near Hollinsclough, Derbyshire, England
- OS grid: SK060679
- Topo map: OS Explorer OL24

Hollins Hill is a gritstone hill in the Derbyshire Peak District near the village of Hollinsclough. The summit is 450 metres (1,480 ft) above sea level. The hill is the source of Swallow Brook, which flows into the River Dove running along the south side of the hill.

The Bronze Age burial mound at the summit is a protected Scheduled Monument. Hollins Hill barrow features a bowl-shaped pit within a round cairn about 13 metres (43 ft) wide. It was excavated by Thomas Bateman in 1851 and subsequently by Micah Salt in 1894. Their finds included human bones, burnt from cremation, in a grave cut into the rock.

The east side of the hill is designated as 'Open Access' land, following the Countryside and Rights of Way Act 2000.

Hollins Hill is one of the 95 Ethels hills of the Peak District, launched by the countryside charity CPRE in 2021.
