= Grindslow Knoll =

Coordinates: 53°22.7′N 1°50.2′W

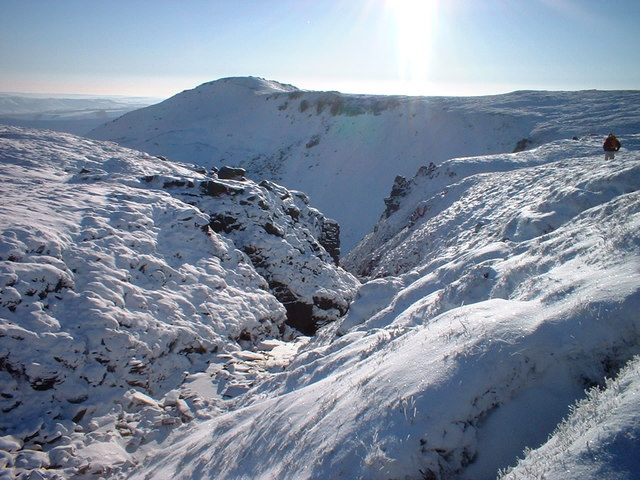
- Grindslow Knoll from Grindsbrook Clough

Highest point
- Elevation: 601 m (1,972 ft)
- Prominence: 15 m (49 ft)
- Parent peak: Kinder Scout
- Listing: none

Geography
- Location: Derbyshire, England
- Parent range: Peak District
- OS grid: SK109868
- Topo map: OS Landranger 110

Grindslow Knoll is a hill in the Dark Peak area of the Peak District National Park in Derbyshire, England. It is joined to Kinder Scout by a high col though from most angles appears as an independent peak. It is the high point at the western side of Grindsbrook Clough.

== Views ==
Although the high mass of Kinder Scout blocks views to the north, Grindslow Knoll is an excellent viewpoint stretching over a large portion of the southern Peak District and steep slopes to the Vale of Edale give a sense of height. There are views of the Nab to the east.

== Ascent ==
It is most often climbed from Edale, either via a steep and eroded path that climbs 350m in just under a mile, or via the popular Grindsbrook Clough. The summit is also an easy detour from the path along the southern edges of Kinder Scout.

== Walking ==
The Pennine Way crosses the hill's southern slopes shortly after leaving Edale, climbing to Broadlee Bank Tor before dropping to Upper Booth. This is the start of a popular walk taking in Jacob's Ladder, Edale Cross, the Woolpacks and either Grindsbrook Clough or Grindslow Knoll.
