= Chinley Churn =

Hill in the Derbyshire Peak District, England

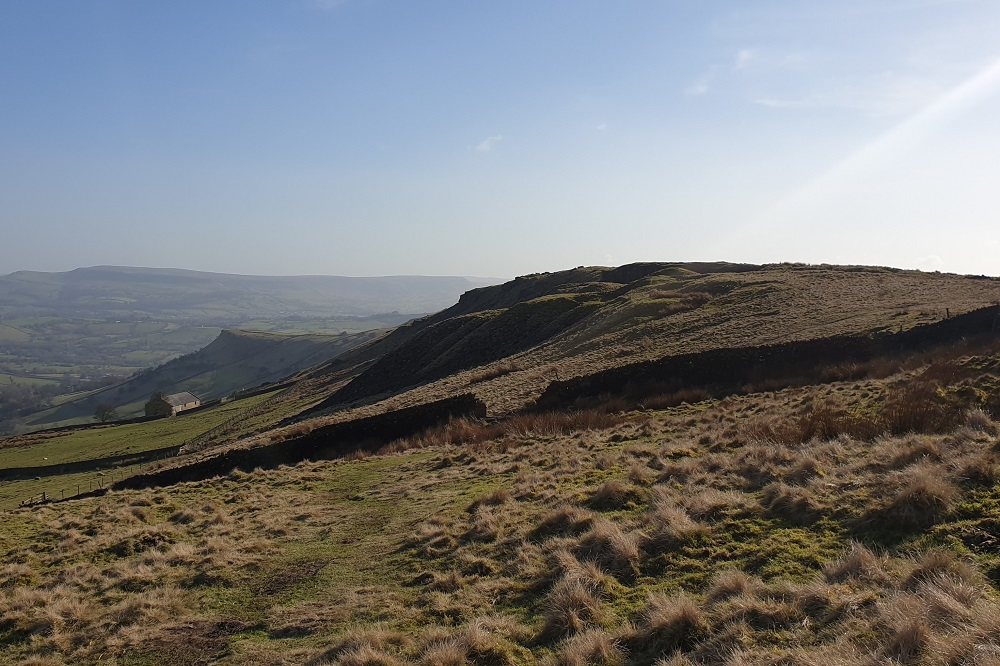

Highest point
- Elevation: 457 metres (1,499 ft)
- Prominence: 127 metres (417 ft)
- Coordinates: 53.356179°N 1.9459626°W

Geography
- Location: Chinley, Derbyshire, England
- OS grid: SK037844
- Topo map: OS Explorer OL1

Chinley Churn is a prominent gritstone hill between the villages of Chinley and Hayfield in the Derbyshire Peak District, England. The summit is 457 metres (1,499 ft) above sea level.

The hilltop ridge area is designated as open access land, following the Countryside and Rights of Way Act 2000. The trig pillar at the lower secondary summit further south is on private land.

Craken Edge Quarry (worked from at least 1640 until the 1900s) is designated a Regionally Important Geological Site. A burial barrow (near the site of the now removed modern trig pillar) was reported in 1901 as the resting place of an ancient Celtic chieftain called Taro Trin (the Bull of Conflict), according to tradition.

Chinley Churn is one of the 95 Ethels hills of the Peak District, launched by the countryside charity CPRE in 2021.

The trig pillar on the hill was removed sometime after April 2024 – thought to be by the farmer.
