= James Clegg (minister) =

English presbyterian minister and author (1679–1755)

James Clegg (1679 – 5 August 1755) was an English Presbyterian minister and author.

== Biography ==
James Clegg was born at Shawfield in the parish of Rochdale, Lancashire on 26 October 1679 and was educated by Richard Frankland at Rathmell in Yorkshire and, later, by John Chorlton at Manchester. He was ordained in 1703.

In 1702, he settled as minister of a Congregational chapel at Malcalf or Malcoffe in Derbyshire, in succession to William Bagshaw, the "Apostle of the Peak". In 1711 he moved to Chinley, where a chapel had been built, partly from the old materials of the Malcoff meeting-house. He remained at Chinley until his death on 5 August 1755.

He qualified as a doctor and obtained the degree of M.D. from the University of Aberdeen. This step was no doubt taken in order that he might have the means of adding to the slender income he would receive as a village dissenting pastor, however, he wrote that he also wanted to offer "a little seasonable help" to the poor people around him; most of his medical work was in the area of smallpox and fractures. Clegg also leased 45 acres of land which he farmed. During his long residence in the Peak District he gained great respect for his abilities and kindly character.

Clegg was a renowned preacher and preached many sermons outside his Derbyshire parish and beyond the county too. In his own parish he preached twice on most Sundays and also "catechized the young people" every Sabbath. His sermons often lasted two hours or more. He was a pious man and confided his shortcomings to his diary and asked for divine help to correct them. He was also a bibliophile, collecting books himself and appraising libraries for estate sales.

=== Diary ===
Clegg began keeping a sporadic diary in 1708 and became more consistent about 10 years later. He records events concerning his family (his five sons and four daughters as well as his and his wife's parents and siblings), community and chapel events. He also recorded his visits (sometimes several a day) to parishioners and others to treat their ailments, to pray with them, or just to visit, covering great distances on foot and on horseback. Occasionally he discusses politics and elections (Clegg was a Whig), and differences about matters of faith among the various Dissenting groups of the time - especially Congregationalists, Presbyterians and Wesleyans (Clegg discussed directly with Wesley). He writes about disputes between families including his son's apprenticeship disagreement with his master/teacher. He also discusses the weather, the state of the roads, catastrophes, accidental deaths and events like eclipses.

A facsimile of his diary (with some explanatory notes) was published by the Derbyshire Record Society in 1978. The original remains in a private collection.

== Family ==
Clegg was married on 24 February 1704 to Ann Champion. After Ann's death in 1742 he married a widow, Sarah Eyre (née Jones) on 2 August 1744; Sarah died 24 November 1748.

Clegg had several sons.

== Writings ==
In 1703, in conjunction with John Ashe, he edited William Bagshaw's Essays on Union to Christ, and shortly afterwards he wrote an "advertisement" prefixed to Ashe's Peaceable and Thankful Temper Recommended, the subject of which is the union of England and Scotland. In 1721, he published a discourse on the "Covenant of Grace", written in answer to Samuel De la Rose of Stockport; and in 1731 he printed a sermon which he had preached at the ordination of John Holland, Junior, entitled The Continuance of the Christian Church secured by its Constitution.

In 1736, Clegg wrote a book which is valuable for its biographical information, entitled A Discourse occasion'd by the sudden death of the Reverend Mr. John Ashe: to which is added a Short Account of his Life and Character, and of some others in or near the High Peak in Derbyshire, as an appendix to the Rev. Mr. William Bagshaw's Book "De Spiritualibus Pecci". He subsequently edited a collection of Seventeen Sermons preached by Ashe.
