= Judson Sykes Bury =

British physician, surgeon, and neurologist

- Born: 13 May 1852; Salford
- Died: 10 June 1944 (aged 92); Chinley, Derbyshire
- Occupations: Physician, surgeon, and neurologist
- Known for: Clinical Medicine: A Manual for the Use of Students and General Practitioners (1894)

Judson Sykes Bury FRCP (1852–1944) was a British physician, surgeon, and neurologist.

== Biography ==
After education at Amersham Hall and then two years at Owens College, Manchester, Judson Bury entered University College London and studied medicine at University College Hospital, London. In 1877 he qualified MRCS and graduated MB (Lond.). After holding house appointments at University College Hospital, he graduated MD (Lond.) in 1879. He returned to Manchester and, after one year as a senior resident medical officer at the Manchester Children's Hospital, Pendlebury, engaged in general practice. At the Manchester Royal Infirmary he became in 1885 a registrar, in 1889 an assistant physician, and in 1899 a full physician. In 1911 he became a professor of clinical at the University of Manchester. He retired from his Manchester appointments in 1912 but during WWI became a major in the RAMC and served on medical boards in Manchester and Warrington.

In 1893 Bury published A Treatise on Peripheral Neuritis, in large part consisting of observations by James Ross (1837–1892). Ross had intended to publish the observations in a monograph.

On Ross's death at the age of 55 it was left to Bury to carry out the intention as fully as he could. The first half of the book was written from views expressed by word of mouth to him by Ross; but the rest was his own except for the section on diabetic neuritis written by R. D. Williamson.

Bury was elected FRCP in 1894.

Judson Bury also published in 1894 Clinical Medicine, a manual for the use of students and junior practitioners; it met with a good response and a third edition appeared in 1912, written jointly with Albert Ramsbottom, his junior colleague at the Manchester Royal Infirmary.

Bury's article Multiple Symmetrical Peripheral Neuritis, contributed to the first edition of Clifford Allbutt's A System of Medicine, contained a section on an epidemic of neuritis in Manchester caused by arsenical impurity in beer. He gave the Bradshaw Lecture in 1901. He published Diseases of the Nervous System in 1912.

He was a fine runner in his youth and a keen golfer up to his death at the age of ninety-two. He was married and had one daughter.

== Selected publications ==
=== Articles ===
- with Sydney Ringer: Ringer, S.; Bury, J. S. (July 1877). "The Influence of Salicine on the Healthy Body with special reference to its Influence on the Temperature". J Anat Physiol. 11(Pt 4) (Pt 4): 588.3–604. PMC 1309722. PMID 17231168.
- Bury, J. S. (2 February 1884). "A Case of Osteomalacia in a Child". Br Med J. 1 (1205): 213–214. doi:10.1136/bmj.1.1205.213. PMC 2306779. PMID 20750807.
- Bury, J. S. (11 June 1892). "Paralysis of the Diaphragm". Br Med J. 1 (1641): 1275. doi:10.1136/bmj.1.1641.1275. PMC 2420422.
- Bury, Judsons. (4 July 1896). "Peripheral neuritis from tobacco". The Lancet. 148 (3801): 23. doi:10.1016/S0140-6736(01)70698-8.
- Bury, J. S. (25 July 1896). "An Address on the Diagnosis of Functional from Organic Disease of the Nervous System". Br Med J. 2 (1856): 189–192. doi:10.1136/bmj.2.1856.189. PMC 2510069. PMID 20756366.
- Bury, J. S. (September 1897). "Nervous Affections of the Hand, and Other Clinical Studies". Edinb Med J. 2 (3): 279–280. PMC 5252096.
- Bury, J. S. (November 1897). "Aphasia and the Cerebral Speech Mechanism". Edinb Med J. 2 (5): 489–490. PMC 5251973.
- Bury, J. S. (8 December 1900). "Remarks on the Diagnosis and Treatment of Arsenical Neuritis". Br Med J. 2 (2084): 1629–1631. doi:10.1136/bmj.2.2084.1629. PMC 2464088. PMID 20759307.
- Bury, Judsons (19 April 1902). "Two cases of paralysis agitans in the same family, in which improvement followed the administration of hyoscine". The Lancet. 159 (4103): 1097–1098. doi:10.1016/S0140-6736(01)70026-8.
- Bury, J. S. (24 May 1902). "A case of complete and temporary paralysis of the limbs in a child, probably a case of recovery from the initial stage of acute anterior poliomyelitis". Br Med J. 1 (2160): 1258–1259. doi:10.1136/bmj.1.2160.1258. PMC 2512148. PMID 20760257.
- Bury, J. S. (30 April 1904). "An Address on Trauma in Relation to Disease of the Nervous System: Presidential Address to the Manchester Medical Society". Br Med J. 1 (2261): 997–1000. doi:10.1136/bmj.1.2261.997. PMC 2353868. PMID 20761514.
- Bury, J. S. (9 October 1909). "Note on alcohol in relation to multiple neuritis". Br Med J. 2 (2545): 1025–1026. doi:10.1136/bmj.2.2545.1025. PMC 2321254. PMID 20764691.
- with J. F. Ward: Bury, Judsons.; Ward, J.F. (1 January 1910). "A case of postural albuminuria in a boy the subject of chorea". The Lancet. 175 (4505): 19–20. doi:10.1016/S0140-6736(01)14249-2.
- Bury, J. S. (15 January 1910). "On a case of spasmodic syringomyelia". Br Med J. 1 (2559): 132–134. doi:10.1136/bmj.1.2559.132. PMC 2330781. PMID 20764859.
- Bury, J. S. (12 August 1916). "Note on the distant effects of rifle bullets; with special reference to the spinal cord". Br Med J. 2 (2902): 212. doi:10.1136/bmj.2.2902.212. PMC 2348772. PMID 20768241.
- Bury, J. S. (24 May 1919). "Swimming in the treatment of paralysis". Br Med J. 1 (3047): 655. doi:10.1136/bmj.1.3047.655-b. PMC 2341265.
- "Symptoms resembling tabes dorsals arising after antityphoid inoculation". The Lancet. 196 (5069): 844–845. 23 October 1920. doi:10.1016/S0140-6736(01)00018-6.
- Bury, J. S. (16 April 1921). "Gunshot injury to the brain involving both cortical and subcortical tissue". Br Med J. 1 (3146): 556–557. doi:10.1136/bmj.1.3146.556. PMC 2414900. PMID 20770257.
- Bury, J. S. (4 July 1931). "Catheter life". Br Med J. 2 (3678): 33–34. doi:10.1136/bmj.2.3678.33-c. PMC 2314116.
- Bury, J. S. (3 April 1943). "War Neuroses". Br Med J. 1 (4291): 426. doi:10.1136/bmj.1.4291.426. PMC 2282508. (Correction in: Br Med J. 1943 Apr 10; 1(4292): 466)

=== Books ===
- with James Ross: On Peripheral Neuritis. London: Charles Griffin & Co. 1893.
- Clinical medicine: A manual for the use of students and junior practitioners. Charles Griffin & Co. 1894.
- Diseases of the nervous system. CIHM/ICMH collection de microfiches; no. 77911. Macmillan. 1912. ISBN 9780665779114.
