= Chapel Milton =

Hamlet in Derbyshire, England

Coordinates: 53.333°N 1.917°W

- Location within Derbyshire
- OS grid reference: SK056817
- Civil parish: Chinley, Buxworth and Brownside
- District: High Peak
- Shire county: Derbyshire
- Region: East Midlands
- Country: England
- Sovereign state: United Kingdom
- Post town: HIGH PEAK
- Postcode district: SK23
- Police: Derbyshire
- Fire: Derbyshire
- Ambulance: East Midlands
- UK Parliament: High Peak

Chapel Milton is a hamlet on the outskirts of Chapel-en-le-Frith on the road leading from there to Chinley and to Glossop. Within the parish of Chinley, Buxworth and Brownside, it takes its name from the site of a medieval corn mill, Maynstonfield Mill, or “Mainstonefield alias Chinley”. This mill was erected near a stream called Hockholme Brook, which is no longer marked though is thought to converge with the Black Brook at Chapel Milton. Originally built in 1391 for £12 4s 1d, the mill (which adjoined what is now Milton House) was demolished in 1946.

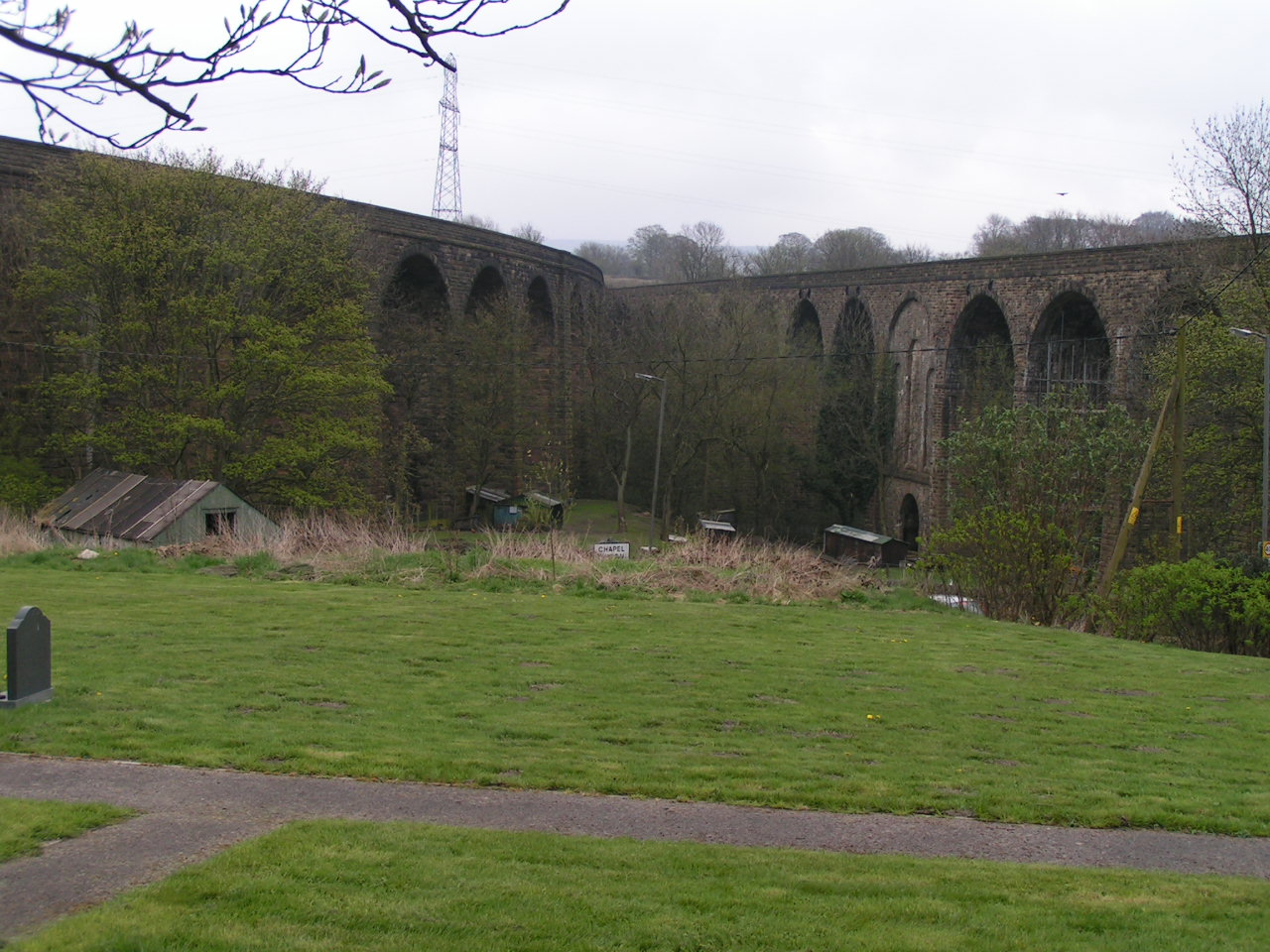
The double railway viaduct

The hamlet is notable for two major features. The first is Chapel Milton Viaduct, bifurcating double railway viaduct crossing the Black Brook, tributary to the Goyt, on which Chapel Milton is situated. One section of the viaduct diverges and curves to the west whilst the other (built a little later) curves to the east as the line, coming up from the south, links up with the main line between Sheffield and Manchester. At one time the western section carried express trains from London (St Pancras) to Manchester Central Station. The viaducts now carry considerable loads of quarried stone from the works around Buxton.

The other major feature is Chinley Chapel. The Christian congregation, which has continuously occupied this site almost since its foundation (in a barn at nearby Malcoff), was founded in 1662 at the time of the post-Cromwellian struggle between a Presbyterian or Episcopalian form for the Church of England. The present 'chapel', of considerable simplicity and beauty, was built, against considerable local opposition, in 1711. It flourishes as a centre of Christian (Congregational) worship. It is part of the Congregational Federation, and the current minister is Rev. Edmonde Openshaw.

John Wesley preached in the hamlet on 28 May 1745, when the miller purportedly tried to drown him out with the sound of the watermill. Grace Bennett (née Murray), Wesley's former fiancé, is buried with the husband she later married, preacher John Bennett, in Chinley Independent Chapel.

The viaduct and chapel are both listed buildings, the latter at Grade II*.
