= Charlestown, Derbyshire =

Village in Glossopdale, Derbyshire, England

Coordinates: 53.4326°N 1.9504°W

Charlestown
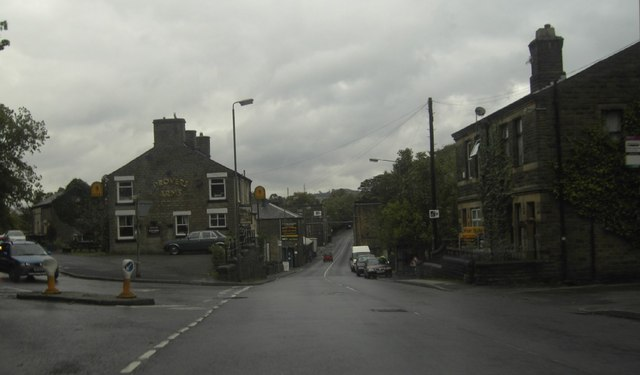

- Location within Derbyshire
- District: High Peak
- Shire county: Derbyshire
- Region: East Midlands
- Country: England
- Sovereign state: United Kingdom
- Post town: Glossop
- Postcode district: SK13

Charlestown is a village in Glossopdale, Derbyshire, England. It is in the Simmondley Ward of the High Peak District Council. The village is situated on the A624 road between Glossop and Hayfield.
