= John Wild (runner) =

English runner

Personal information
- Nationality: English
- Born: 13 February 1953 (age 73)

John Richard Wild (born 13 February 1953) is a male English former runner who competed in cross country, fell running, and the 3000m steeplechase.

== Athletics career ==
The early part of Wild’s running career was focused on cross country and track. He won the Inter-Counties Cross Country Championships in 1974 and 1980. He represented England in the 3,000 metres steeplechase event at the 1978 Commonwealth Games in Edmonton, Alberta, Canada. Also in 1978, he won the Cross de San Sebastián and in 1980, he was victorious at the Cross Internacional Juan Muguerza. Wild represented his country at the World Cross Country Championships, finishing in fifteenth place in the 1978 edition.

In 1981, Wild won the British Fell Running Championships at his first attempt. He won thirteen races in the Fell Runners Association calendar that year, setting new course records in seven of them. He repeated his championship success in 1982 and the following year finished second after close rivalry with Kenny Stuart.

Wild won the Ben Nevis Race in 1983 in a then-record time of 1:25:35, only one second slower than the current record. Among his other victories were the Snowdon Race in 1981 and 1982 and the Three Peaks Race in 1982 in a time of 2:37:30, which was a record for the route which was then in use.

Wild still holds the course records for the English fell races at the Wrekin, Rivington Pike and Burnsall, as well as for the Ben Lomond Hill Race in Scotland, all set in the early 1980s.

In late 1983, Wild decided to turn his attention to the marathon but his success was limited by injury and knee problems.

Wild worked as a flight sergeant and was based at RAF Cosford.

His life story is told in Steve Chilton's 'Running Hard: the story of a rivalry' (Dingwall, 2017).
