= Chunal =

Hamlet in Derbyshire, England

Coordinates: 53.423°N 1.950°W

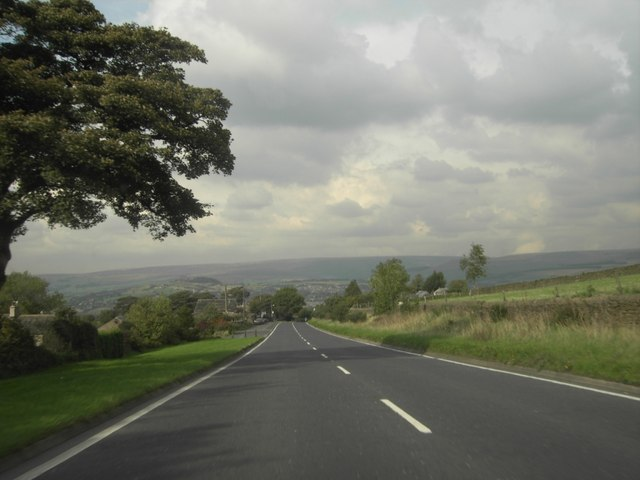
- Chunal

- Location within Derbyshire
- Population: 30
- OS grid reference: SK034918
- District: High Peak
- Shire county: Derbyshire
- Region: East Midlands
- Country: England
- Sovereign state: United Kingdom
- Post town: Glossop
- Postcode district: SK13
- Dialling code: 01457
- Police: Derbyshire
- Fire: Derbyshire
- Ambulance: North West
- UK Parliament: High Peak

Chunal is a hamlet in Derbyshire, England. It is located on the A624 road, 1 mile south of Glossop. The philosopher Ludwig Wittgenstein conducted aeronautical research at Chunal during his time as an engineering research student at Manchester University (1908–1911). He flew kites into the upper atmosphere.

There are three listed buildings in the locality, all designated at Grade II: White House, a farmhouse dated 1669; an 18th-century barn to the south of Shepley Farm; and Horseshoe Farmhouse and an adjacent barn. A public house, the Grouse Inn, closed in 2014–2015 and is now a private house.

== Transport ==
There are several bus stops going through the hamlet towards Charlestown, Glossop, Buxton and Macclesfield.
