= John Bennet (preacher) =

John Bennet (1714–1759) was an early Methodist Evangelist, regarded as being "one of Wesley’s most responsible helpers in Yorkshire, Lancashire and Derbyshire".

== Life ==
Born at Whitehaugh, near Chapel-en-le-Frith, Derbyshire, he was the youngest son of William Bennet, a yeoman, and his wife Ann, who were members of the local Dissenting Chapel of Dr James Clegg. Having received a good education at the school at Chapel-en-le-Frith and at the hands of private tutors, at the age of about seventeen Bennet attended Findern Academy, near Derby, to study for the Ministry. However, for unknown reasons, Bennet later commenced work as a Justice's Clerk, and then as an independent packman transporting goods across the moors, from Sheffield to Macclesfield.

While working as a packman, Bennet met the itinerant preacher, David Taylor, a former butler of Selina Hastings, Countess of Huntingdon, and became his travelling companion. In January 1741, Bennet had an evangelical conversion experience at Hayfield, Derbyshire. In the spring of the following year, he met Benjamin Ingham the Moravian, and became his associate. In the Summer of 1742, Bennet first met John Wesley and, impressed by his preaching, and became connected with the Methodist movement. As a Methodist preacher, Bennet soon established a circuit of religious societies scattered throughout the north of England, later known as "John Bennet’s Round". Usually on horseback, Bennet would follow a route from his home at Chinley which took him throughout the northern counties.

While serving as a Methodist preacher, Bennet not only served as an itinerant preacher but he was, as Frank Baker remarked; "one of the architects of early Methodist connexionalism". Bennet was highly influential in the introduction of the first annual Methodist conference, not only providing the idea for such a conference, providing a detailed account of that meeting. Bennet was also credited with establishing the first Methodist Circuit Quarterly Meeting which took place "at Major Marshall’s at Todmorden Edge on Tuesday 18th October, 1748". Under Bennet's supervision, such Quarterly Meetings were introduced elsewhere and became a key feature of Methodist organization.

Apart from his preaching activities, Bennet will be remembered for his marriage to the widow, Grace Murray on 3 October 1749, a woman who at the time of Bennet's proposal was already apparently engaged to no less a person than John Wesley himself. This affaire de coeur, and Bennet's Calvinistic views which stood in sharp contrast with Wesley's Arminianism, led to Bennet's departure from Methodism. In 1752 Bennet, after a fierce debate with Wesley, seceded from the Methodist Church in Bolton, Lancashire, taking a large segment of the Methodist society with him. He served as minister at Bolton for the following two years. In 1754 Bennet, now ordained as a congregationalist Minister, pastored a Church in the village of Warburton, Cheshire. On 24 May 1759, Bennet, fatigued with much preaching and constant sickness, finally died at the age of forty-five.

Traditionally Methodist historians loyal to Wesley have dismissed Bennet as "an incorrigible Dissenter", or as "a treacherous, unfriendly man". A more accurate appraisal of Bennet is given by Nehemiah Curnock, when he stated that Bennet was "one of the most successful of the north-country evangelists". As James Everett remarked: "few men were more useful in the early stages of Methodism than he". The first, and only comprehensive biography of Bennet was written by Dr S. R. Valentine and published in 1997.

== Notes ==
1. R. Tudur Jones, Congregationalism in England 1662–1962, London, Independent Press, 1962, p. 155.
2. See V. Doe, (ed) The Diary of James Clegg, 1708–55, 3 vols., Derbyshire Record Society, 1978.
3. F. Baker, John Bennet and early Methodist polity, Proceedings of the Wesley Historical Society, vol. xxxv, 1965, pp. 1–4.
4. Bennet's diary, S. R. Valentine, Mirror of the Soul: the diary of an early Methodist preacher, John Bennet, 1714–1754, Methodist Publishing House, Peterborough, 2002, 18 October 1748.
5. G. E. Harrison, Son to Susanna, London, Nicholson & Watson, 1937, p. 144.
6. C. E. Vulliamy, John Wesley, London, Geoffrey Bles, 1933, p. 214.
7. The words of N. Curnock, (ed.) J. Wesley, The Journal of John Wesley, London, Epworth Press, 1938, 3: 375n.
8. J. Everett, Historical Sketches of Wesleyan Methodism in Sheffield, Sheffield, J. Montgomery, 1823, p. 40.

== Bibliography ==
- S. R. Valentine, John Bennet and the Origins of Methodism and the Evangelical Revival in England, University Press of America, 1997.
- Brailsford, M. R. A Tale of Two Brothers, Rupert Hart-Davis, London, 1954
- Overton, J. H. John Wesley, London, Methuen, 1891.
- Rack, H. D. "Survival and Revival: John Bennet, Methodism and the Old Dissent", Studies in Church History, Blackwell, Oxford, 1990.
- Tyerman, L. The Life and Times of the Rev John Wesley, MA founder of the Methodists, 3 vols., London, Hodder & Stoughton, 1890.Valentine, S. R. John Bennet and the Evangelical Revival in England, Scarecrow Press, Lanham, USA, 1997.
- S. R. Valentine, Mirror of the Soul: the diary of an early Methodist preacher, John Bennet, 1714–1754, Methodist Publishing House, Peterborough, 2002.
- S. R. Valentine, John Bennet, Methodist Publishing House, Peterborough, 2009.
- S. R. Valentine, John Bennet, Servant of Jesus Christ in the Worke of ye Gospel, Methodist History, vol. XXX, April 1992, No. 3, pp. 159–165.
