= Brown Knoll =

Hill in Derbyshire, England

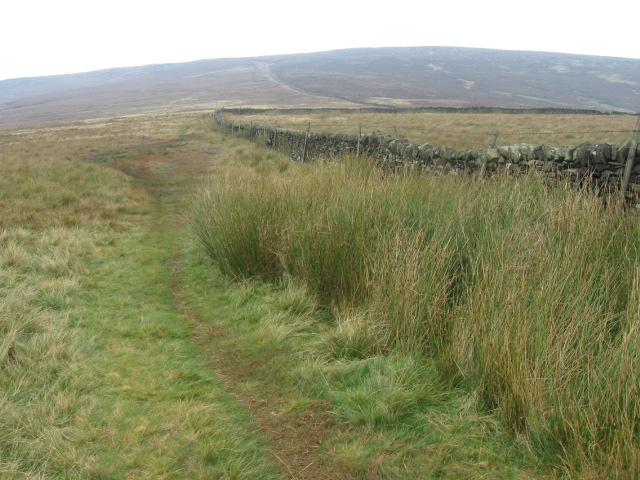
- Looking towards Brown Knoll

Highest point
- Elevation: 569 m (1,867 ft)
- Prominence: 36 m
- Parent peak: Kinder Scout
- Listing: Dewey, TuMP
- Coordinates: 53°21′48″N 1°52′32″W

Geography
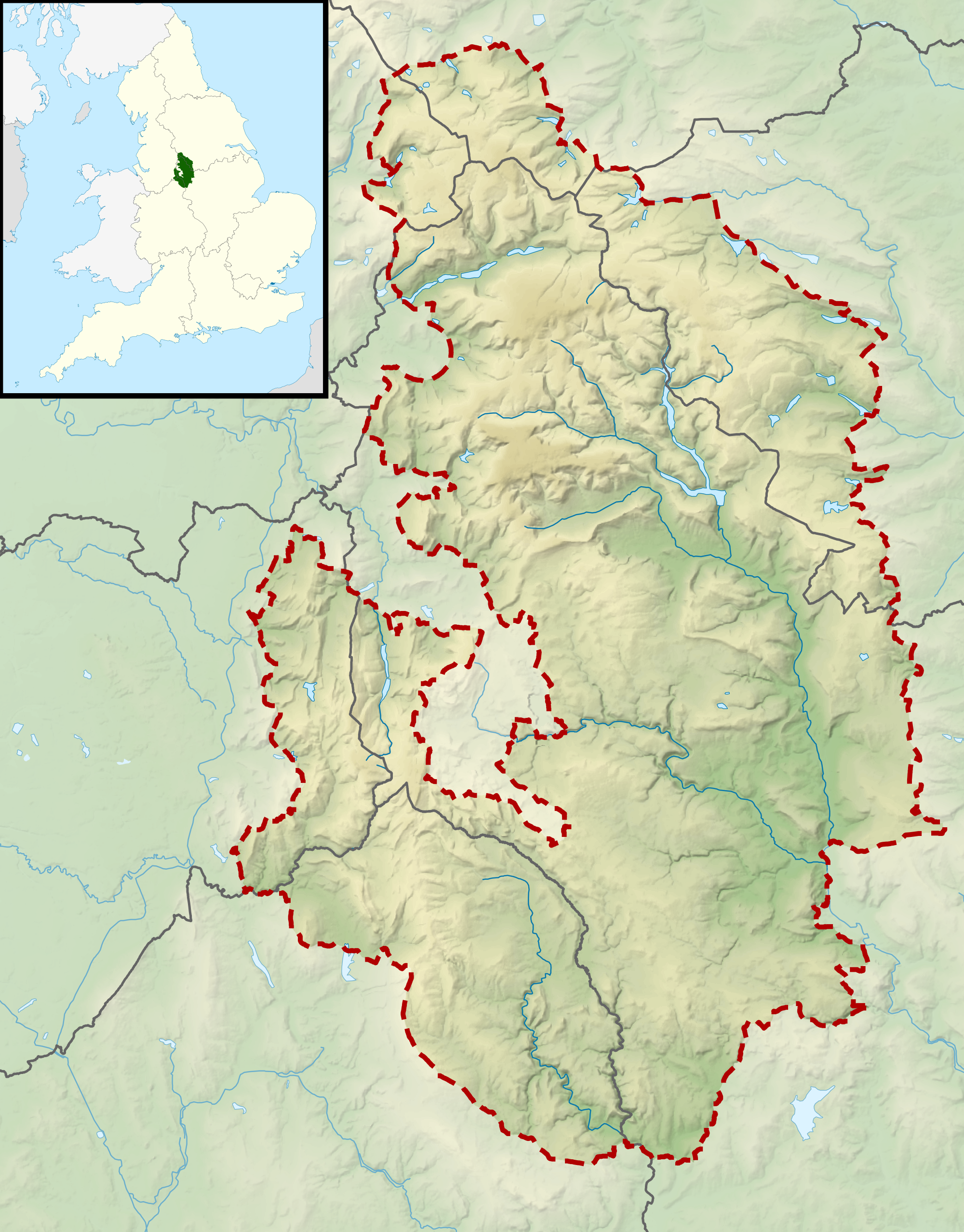
- Location within the Peak District Location within Derbyshire
- Location: Derbyshire, England
- Parent range: Peak District
- OS grid: SK083851
- Topo map: OS Landranger 110; OL1W

Brown Knoll is one of the highest hills in the Peak District in central England. It rises to a height of 569 metres (1,867 ft) above the head of the Edale valley and about 3 kilometres (1.9 mi) south-southwest of the Peak's highest point, Kinder Scout.

== Description ==
Brown Knoll is a treeless, domed summit covered in moorland vegetation. A track between the Pennine Way and Pennine Bridleway runs past the summit to the northwest and a footpath branches off from that track crosses the summit itself and heads southeast to the hills lining the southern side of the valley of Edale. The area is designated Open Access land, but is outside the National Trust's High Peak Estate.
