= Chapel Milton Viaduct =

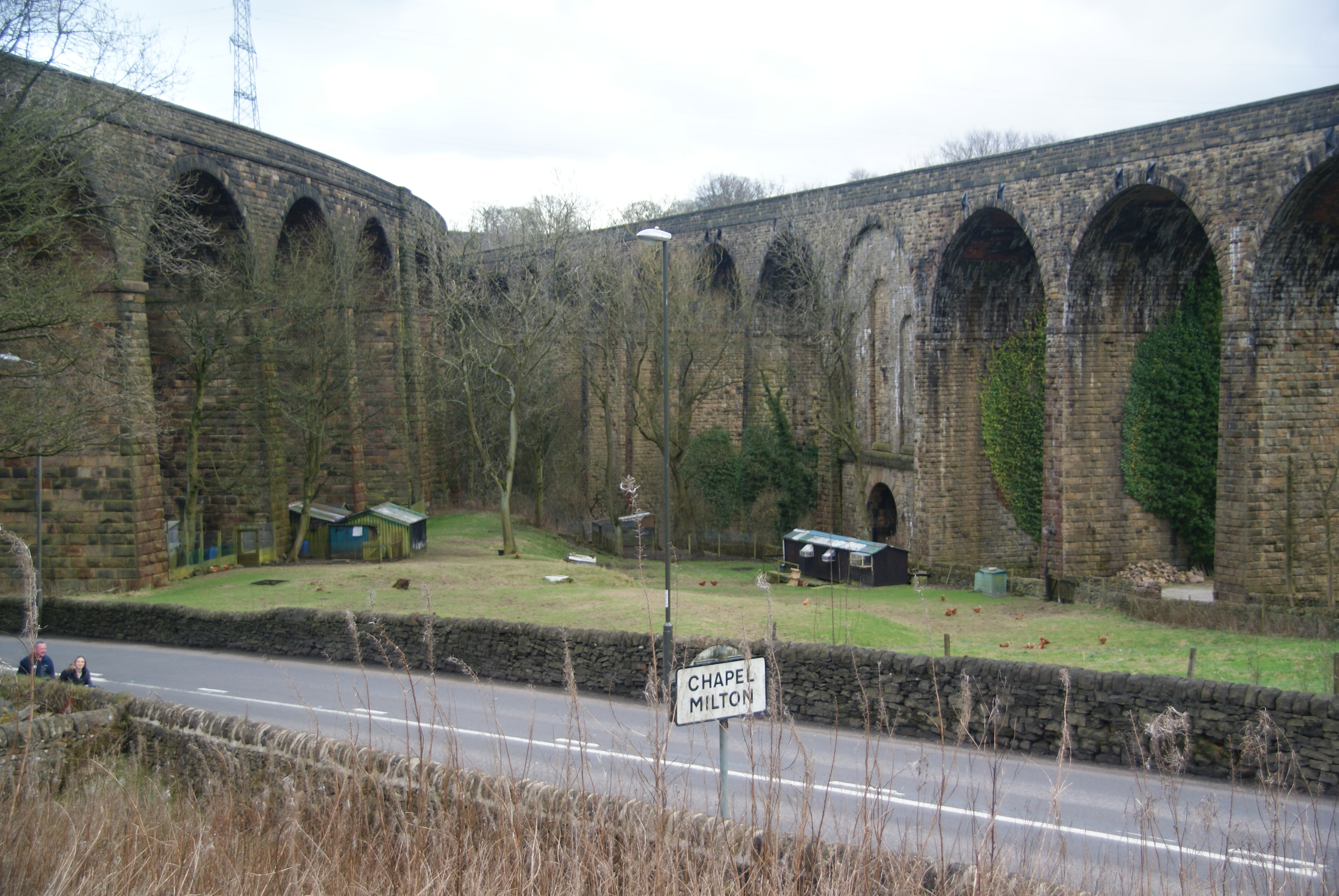
- East (left) and west (right) sections viewed from above the A624
- Coordinates: 53.333596°N 1.917985°W
- Carries: Great Rocks Line
- Crosses: Black Brook; A624
- Locale: Chapel Milton, Derbyshire, England
- Maintained by: Network Rail
- Heritage status

Listed Building – Grade II
- Designated: 12 April 1984
- Reference no.: 1187176

Characteristics
- Material: Gritstone ashlar
- Total length: 780 feet (240 m) (east)
- Height: 102 feet (31 m)
- No. of spans: 14 (east); 15 (west)

Rail characteristics
- No. of tracks: Double track
- Track gauge: Standard gauge
- Electrified: No

History
- Architect: William Henry Barlow
- Constructed by: Echerley and Bayliss
- Construction cost: £15,000
- Opened: 1867

Location
- Map of the triangular site and surrounding lines (click to enlarge)

Chapel Milton Viaduct is a Grade II listed bifurcated railway viaduct on the Great Rocks Line at its junction with the Hope Valley Line, straddling the Black Brook valley in Chapel Milton, Derbyshire, England. The first section of the viaduct, built by the Midland Railway in 1867, diverges and curves to the west while the second, built in 1890, curves to the east as the line, coming up from the south, links up with the main line between Sheffield and Manchester.

Originally built to carry express trains from London St Pancras to Manchester London Road, the viaduct now carries a freight-only line transporting limestone from the quarries and works around Buxton.

The viaduct is a significant and dominant structure within the small hamlet, which is largely characterised by its presence. It also passes over the Peak Forest Tramway, an early industrial railway operational from 1796. Since July 2019, an aerial shot of the double viaduct has featured in the opening titles of the regional news programme BBC North West Tonight.

== Description ==
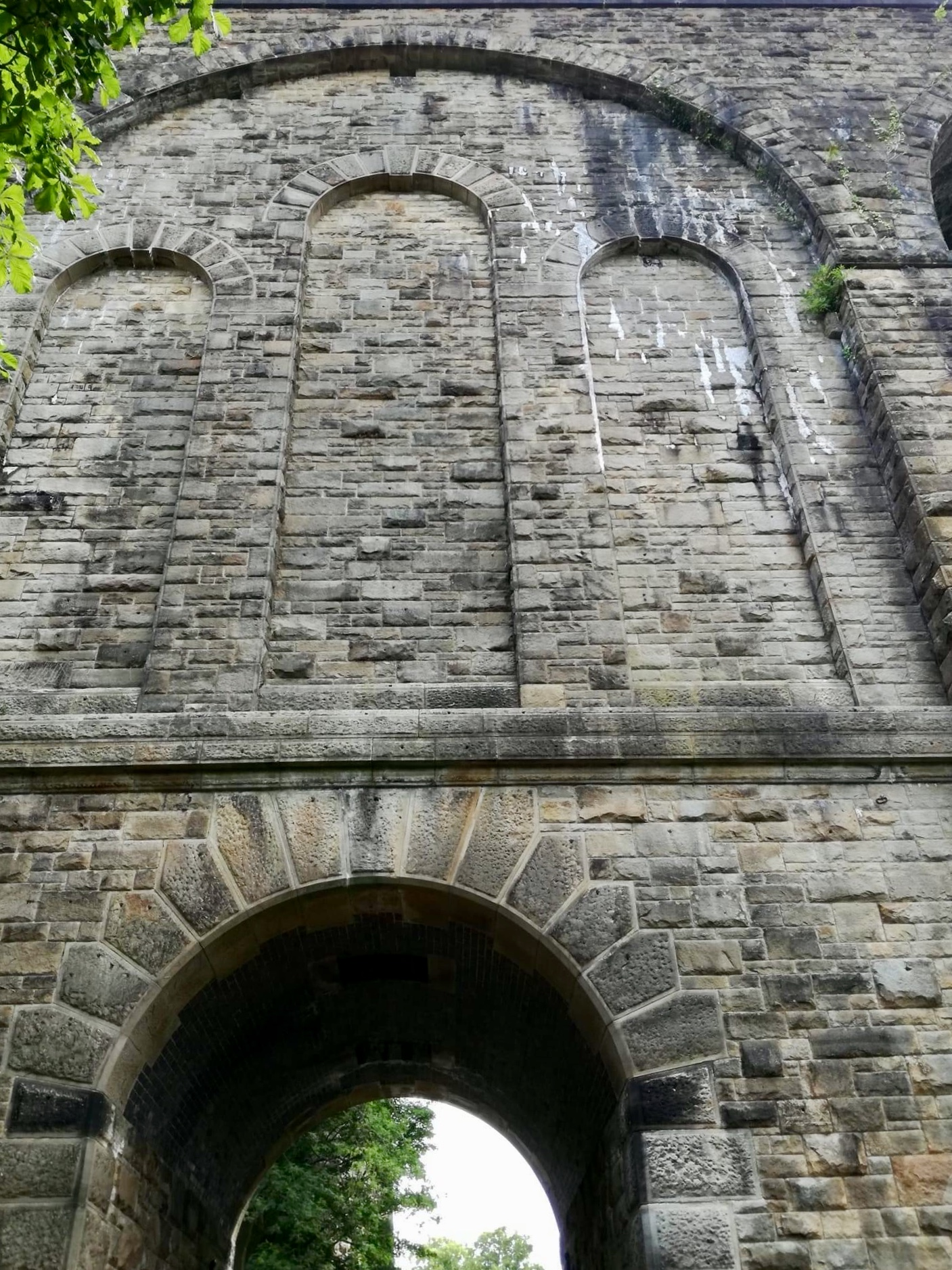
The blind arch, with gateway through the bottom

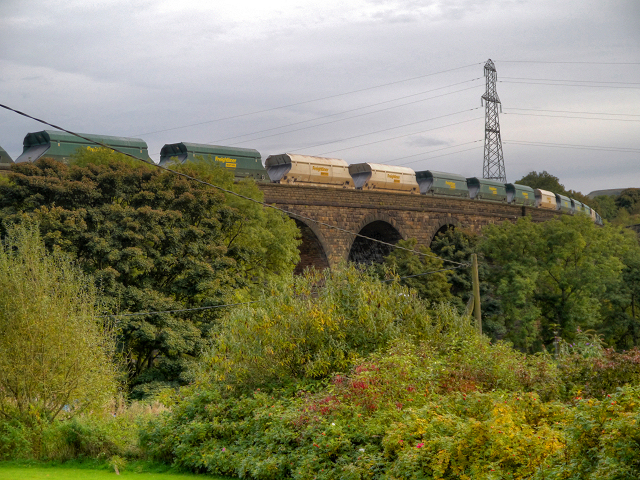
A stone train crossing the viaduct

The viaduct has two curved arcades, converging to the south with fourteen arches to the east and fifteen to the west. The central arch of the western arcade is blocked with a blind venetian arch; it is filled with clay to help reduce vibration. It has tapering rectangular piers with a projecting string course at the top. All arches are stilted and voussoired, with a string course and parapet wall over, topped by projecting copings.

The masonry of the viaduct is composed of rubble work in regular courses, and the span of each arch is 42 feet (13 m). The gradient of the line over the viaduct is 1 in 90 throughout; at its highest point it is 102 feet (31 m) from water to rail level.

== History ==
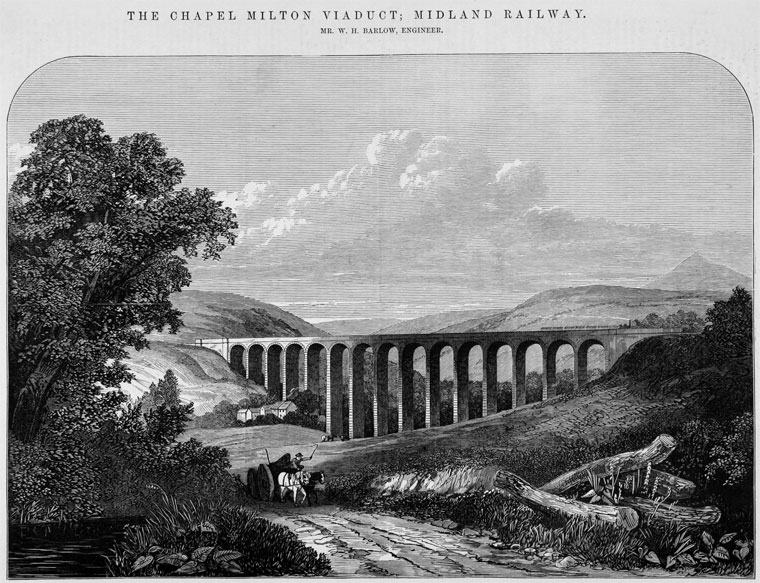
An 1868 drawing of Chapel Milton Viaduct from The Engineer

The Midland Railway opened a new line via Chapel-en-le-Frith Central and Great Rocks Dale, linking the Manchester, Buxton, Matlock and Midland Junction Railway with the Manchester, Sheffield and Lincolnshire Railway, in 1867, giving it an express through route for the first time between Manchester and London. The Midland's Engineer-in-Chief for the project was William Henry Barlow (known for designing the train shed at St Pancras at around the same time), and he designed, along with the rest of the structures on the line, the Chapel Milton Viaduct which curves to the west at the junction with the MS&LR. The fifteen-arch bridge was required to carry the railway across a deep valley formed by the Black Brook, which is a tributary of the River Goyt.

The stone was obtained from Black Edge Quarry, about two miles from the works. Some of the larger stones in the foundation were raised in Crist Quarry, Bugsworth. Several of the piers near the centre had to be carried down a depth of 45 feet (14 m) from the surface of the ground to ensure a sufficient foundation. According to a contemporary report in The Engineer, the viaduct cost £15,000 (equivalent to £1,678,000 in 2023), given at the rate of 5s 3d per cubic yard; the contractors were Echerley and Bayliss of Victoria Street, Westminster.

The erection of this viaduct on the new line to Manchester will open up the shortest and most agreeable route to the "northern metropolis," and many passengers will probably travel by the Midland Railway in summer for the sake of the charming scenery, independently of the advantage of time and distance, as this line [...] runs through the choicest parts of the Derbyshire hills. The Midland extension leaves the Rowsley and Buxton line at about six miles below Buxton, and after a course of twelve miles through the mountains, close to the "peak" of Derbyshire, it forms a junction with the Sheffield and Lincolnshire Companies' new line from Manchester to Hayfield at New Mills. Through a country of such a character the railway, all might be expected, has large works, the principal of which are a tunnel one and a-half miles in length and the viaduct we have just described.

— The Engineer, January 1867

The eastern section, essentially a second, mirror-image viaduct in an identical style, was added in 1890 to allow trains to travel between Sheffield and the south via Buxton and the Midland's own line.

The viaduct is recorded in the National Heritage List for England as a Grade II listed building, having been designated on 12 April 1984. Grade II is the lowest of the three grades of listing, and is applied to "buildings that are nationally important and of special interest".

A refurbishment of the western section was undertaken by the bridge's owner and maintainer Network Rail in 2017, with works including vegetation removal, repointing, localised stitch repair to cracks, and removal and replacement of localised areas of spalled brickwork.

Further restorative works were completed in 2025 to strengthen the viaduct for future freight use. This included filling voids across each span to strengthen the structure, brickwork repairs, reinforcement of the parapets (bridge walls) and installation of new waterproofing and drainage systems.
