= William Bagshaw =

English presbyterian and nonconformist minister

William Bagshaw or Bagshall (1628–1702) was an English Presbyterian and nonconformist minister, known as the "Apostle of the Peak".

== Life ==
He was born at Litton, Derbyshire, on 17 January 1628, the son of William Bagshaw of Hucklow. His brother Adam Bagshaw had Wormhill Hall constructed. This remains with the Bagshawe family to the present day. William received his early education at country schools, and met puritan ministers Rowlandson of Bakewell and Bourn of Ashover. He entered Corpus Christi College, Cambridge, in 1646. He was ordained into the Church of England.

He preached his first sermon in the chapel of Wormhill, in his native parish. From Tideswell he moved to Attercliffe, in Yorkshire. Here he occupied a twofold post, being assistant to the Rev. James Fisher of Sheffield, and chaplain in the family of Colonel John Bright. He received presbyterian ordination in 1651 at Chesterfield. On 11 June 1651 he married Agnes (baptised 19 April 1626), daughter of Peter Barker of Darley, North Yorkshire. Early in the year 1652 he was appointed Vicar of Glossop, where he worked for the next ten and a half years and would have continued to do so if not for the passing of the second Act of Uniformity in 1662, which resulted in the ejection of 1,700 of the clergy of the Church of England.

After the Restoration, he gave up his living in protest of the Act of Uniformity 1662. He retired to Ford Hall near Chinley, in an adjacent parish. He lived as a country gentleman, attended the parish church, but continued to preach and regularly conducted a service on Thursday evenings in his own house. After the Declaration of Indulgence of 1672, he felt free to preach regularly in his former parish and in the neighbourhood, which was in the Peak District (also known as "The Peak") of Derbyshire, resulting in the moniker "Apostle of the Peak". The Peak District includes the towns of Buxton, Tideswell, Hucklow (Great and Little Hucklow), Litton and Wormhill, which were familiar places in William Bagshaw's early and later life. He lectured at Ashford, Malcoff, Middleton, Bradwell, Chelmorton and Hucklow. When the Declaration was recalled by Charles II, he continued to preach secretly. There were several ineffective warrants issued against him. While James II's 'Declaration for Liberty of Conscience' was in force, and again through the beginning of William and Mary's reign, he was an incessant preacher. He died on 1 April 1702, and was buried next to his wife Agnes (died 1 June 1701) at Chapel-en-le-Frith, 5 miles (8.0 km) north of Buxton. A marble and alabaster memorial of 1880 in the church at Chapel-en-le-Frith contains a long inscription and mentions the following children of William and Agnes: John (born 8 January 1654) and Samuel (born 31 December 1656).

His Life and Funeral Sermon was published by John Ashe (1704), and is the main source of information on his life.

His great-grandson Samuel Bagshawe served as DL and JP for Derbyshire.

== Works ==
He left manuscripts (fifty volumes) but little survived. His published books are all short. Their (abbreviated) titles are:

- Waters for a Thirsty Soul, in several sermons on Rev. xxi. 6. London, 1653
- Of Christ's Purchase, to which is prefixed his Confession of Faith
- Rules for our Behaviour every Day and for sanctifying the Sabbath, with Hints for Communicants
- The Ready Way to prevent Sin on Prov. xxx. 22, with A Bridle for the Tongue, on St. Matt. x. 36
- The Miner's Monitor
- The Sinner in Sorrow and the Humble Sinner's Modest Request
- Brief Directions for the Improvement of Infant Baptism
- The Riches of Grace, three parts
- Trading Spiritualized, three parts
- De Spiritualibus Pecci: Notes concerning the Work of God, and some that have been walkers together with God in the High Peak of Derbyshire, a biographical work (London, 1702)
- Principiis Obsta 1671
- Sheet for Sufferers
- Matters for Mourning, posthumous
- Essays on Union to Christ, posthumous
