= Chinley =

Village in Derbyshire, England

Coordinates: 53.339°N 1.941°W

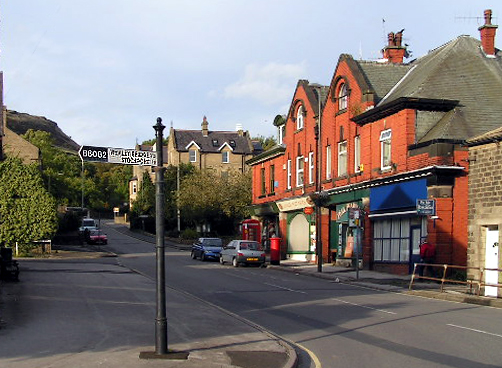
- Chinley village

- Location within Derbyshire
- Population: 2,796 (2011)
- OS grid reference: SK040825
- Civil parish: Chinley, Buxworth and Brownside
- District: High Peak
- Shire county: Derbyshire
- Region: East Midlands
- Country: England
- Sovereign state: United Kingdom
- Post town: HIGH PEAK
- Postcode district: SK23
- Dialling code: 01663
- Police: Derbyshire
- Fire: Derbyshire
- Ambulance: East Midlands
- UK Parliament: High Peak

Chinley is a rural village in the High Peak Borough of Derbyshire, England, with a population of 2,796 at the 2011 Census. Most of the civil parish (called Chinley, Buxworth and Brownside) is within the Peak District National Park. Historically, before the coming of the railway, the area was economically dominated by agriculture. Nowadays most inhabitants commute out of the village to work; accessible centres of work include Stockport, Sheffield and Manchester.

== Location ==
Chinley lies in the Blackbrook Valley. To the north is Cracken Edge, a once-quarried promontory of Chinley Churn, a large, prominent hill with a pass followed by the A624 named Chinley Head. Brown Knoll commands the skyline on the eastern border of the civil parish, with South Head and Mount Famine to the north-east. An old winding engine can still be seen atop an incline on the north-eastern face of Cracken Edge. Immediately south of the village, brook and parish border is Eccles Pike, an almost-conical hill, partly owned by the National Trust.

Filling the upper end of the valley to the southeast is Chapel-en-le-Frith, more than twice the size of Chinley in area and in population. Other nearby towns include Whaley Bridge (2 miles (3.2 km) west), New Mills (3 miles (4.8 km) northwest), Glossop (6 miles (9.7 km) north) and Buxton (5 miles (8.0 km) south). Buxworth in the same civil parish is the location of Bugsworth Basin on the Peak Forest Canal. Buxton Road to the east (bypassed here by the A6 through Whitehough) leads to the small settlement of New Smithy, beyond which the road turns south to Chapel Milton before crossing the Black Brook and continuing south into Chapel-en-le-Frith.

The boundary of the Peak District National Park runs up the middle of Stubbins Lane and part of Maynestone Road, before crossing down into the valley and over Otter Brook, towards Wash.

== Transport ==
Chinley railway station has a single island platform on the trans-Pennine Hope Valley Line between Sheffield and Manchester Piccadilly. The typical service is one train every hour each way to Sheffield and to Manchester Piccadilly, operated by Northern Trains. It is one of only two stations between Stockport and Sheffield where East Midlands Railway express trains stop in peak hours.

The coming of the railways was the reason Chinley grew from the tiny hamlet it had been and the village is actually named after its railway station. Previously, the names Maynestonefield or Four Lanes End were used. Chinley station was once an important railway junction on the Midland Railway's Dore and Chinley (or Hope Valley) Line; it had a London-bound extension through Millers Dale and it was common to have to change trains in Chinley en route to Manchester, London or Sheffield.

== Amenities ==
Chinley has a primary school; a small residential special school; an active village community centre and a Women's Institute hall; two village greens (one was formerly the bowling green); two parks, one of which is a local nature reserve; and a small collection of shops, including an Indian restaurant, tea shop, cheese shop, pizzeria and a fish and chip shop.

Chinley Juniors Football Club plays its games at Chinley Community Centre. Chinley Churners cycling club is officially affiliated to British Cycling and boasts members of all ages.

== Notable buildings and constructions ==
Chinley Independent Chapel, on the southeastern edge of Chinley adjacent to Chapel Milton, was built in 1711. The chapel was established by William Bagshaw as a nonconformist church in 1662, and is still the home of the local Congregational church. It has simple furnishings and a pulpit near the centre of the building.

The route of the Peak Forest Tramway (in use from 1796–1923), an early horse-and-gravity-powered railway, runs along the southern edge of Chinley near the Black Brook. The one remaining entrance to the Stodhart Tunnel, one of the oldest railway tunnels in Britain, is just inside the entrance to Chapel Lodge nursing home, on the road between Chapel Milton and Chapel-en-le-Frith (in the latter parish). Part of the route is used as a road for testing car brakes by Ferodo, a local manufacturer of brakes and car parts. There are ruins or conversions of a few mills — one still in use as a plastics factory — and one or two large manor-style homes near the route.

The fine stone building of Chinley railway station was dismantled in 1902 and re-erected as a private house on Maynestone Road on the northeast edge of Chinley.

The Old Hall in the nearby hamlet of Whitehough, across the Black Brook to the south, dates from Elizabethan times and, with the adjacent 400-year-old licensed premises, forms part of the Old Hall Inn. A King's Mill stood alongside the Black Brook in Chapel Milton for around 700 years, but was destroyed in 1946 to allow construction of a water treatment facility for Ferodo.

A small cattle market was developed on the south side of the railway, near the station, in the early 19th century by a local farmers' co-operative society. It was conducted by Brady & Son of Stockport, who could access it conveniently from Tiviot Dale station on the Midland Railway. It closed before the Second World War.

== Notable people ==
John Bennet (1714–1759), described as "one of John Wesley's most outstanding young preachers", was born at Chinley and lived at Lee End. Bennet and his wife Grace Murray are buried in the graveyard of nearby Chinley Chapel.

Charles Wesley visited Chinley regularly; it is said he was in love with Grace Murray.

George Kirk of the Old Hall, Whitehough was groom to the Royal Bedchamber of King Charles I, and was present when the king was beheaded in 1649.

Edwina Currie, former Conservative minister, winner of Celebrity Mastermind and author, moved to Whitehough in 2010, but moved to nearby Whaley Bridge in 2012.

Constance Felicity Goddard (1881–1954), novelist and poet. Daughter of Mary Ann and James Goddard, dairy farmer, of Heatherlea, Maynestone Road. Novels included Dear Charity (1922), Silver Woods (1939), Come Wind Come Weather (1945), Three at Cherry-Go-Gay (1949). A review in The Spectator compared her work to that of Alison Uttley and Flora Thompson. Her Poems were published in 1929.

Eric Hollies (1912–1981), cricketer. A Warwickshire and England leg-break bowler who dismissed Don Bradman in his final Test innings, he died in Chinley aged 68.

== See also ==
- Listed buildings in Chinley, Buxworth and Brownside
