= Eccles Pike =

Hill in Derbyshire, England

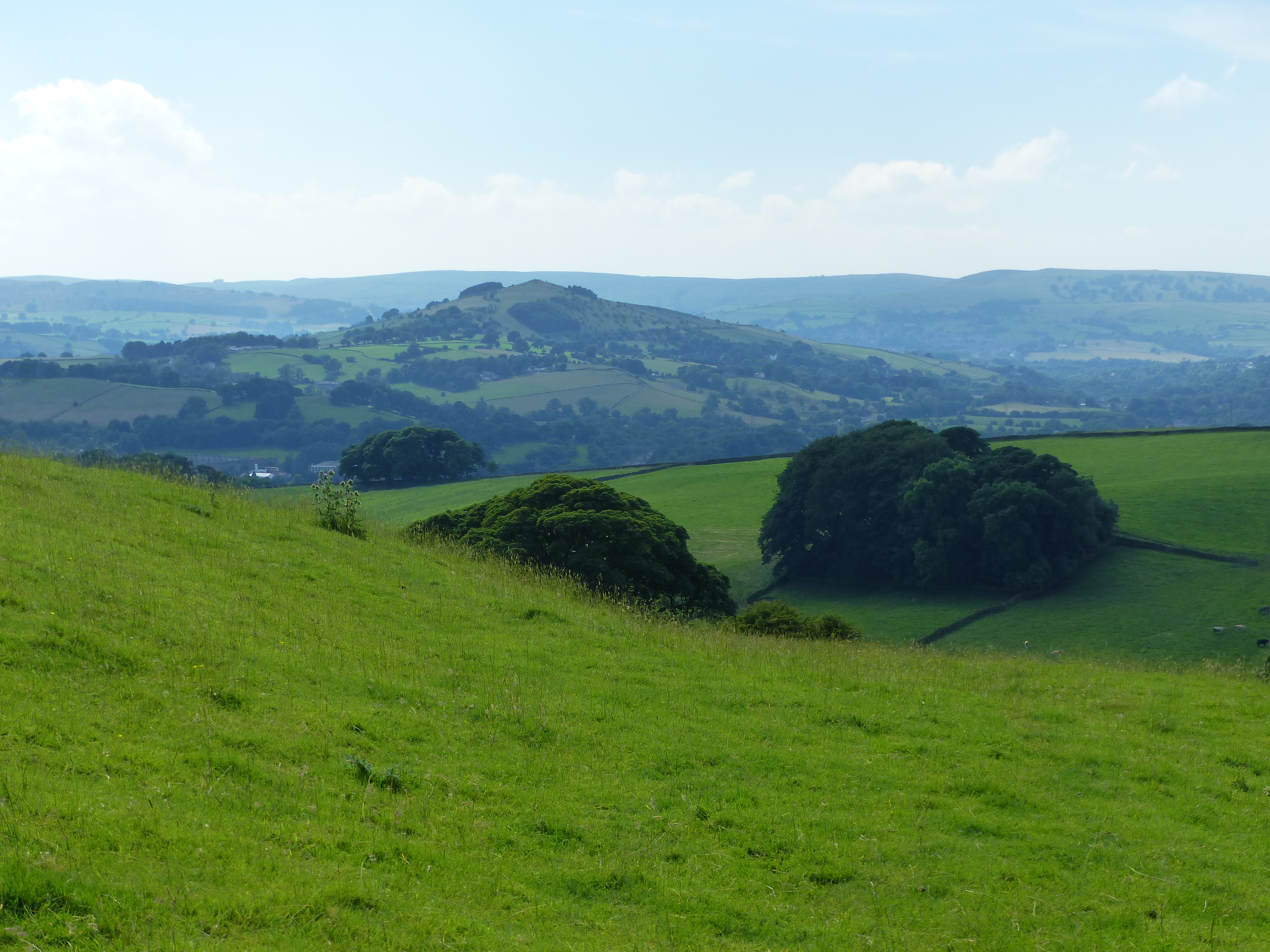
- Eccles Pike from the west

Highest point
- Elevation: 370 m (1,210 ft)
- Parent peak: Shining Tor
- Coordinates: 53°19′41″N 1°56′56″W

Geography
- Location within Derbyshire
- Location: Chapel-en-le-Frith, Derbyshire, England
- Parent range: Peak District
- OS grid: SK035812
- Topo map: OS Explorer OL1 OS Landranger 110

Eccles Pike is an isolated hill three miles west of Chapel en le Frith in the Derbyshire Peak District, England. It consists of gritstone, pink in colour at the summit. While not as prominent as the surrounding hills of Cracken Edge and Combs Moss, it is popular with walkers. At 370 metres (1,210 ft) above sea level, it offers good views of Manchester to the west and the Kinder Scout plateau to the east. Combs Reservoir lies just south of the hill.

The name 'pike' means pointed hill; it's not known how it acquired the name Eccles, or whether this name relates to the town on the other side of Manchester famous for its currant cakes.

== Eccles Pike Fell Race ==
The Eccles Pike Fell Race is reputedly one of the oldest fell races in the country, dating back to the beginning of the 20th century. It is renowned for being short, tough and demanding.

== Commemorative plaque ==
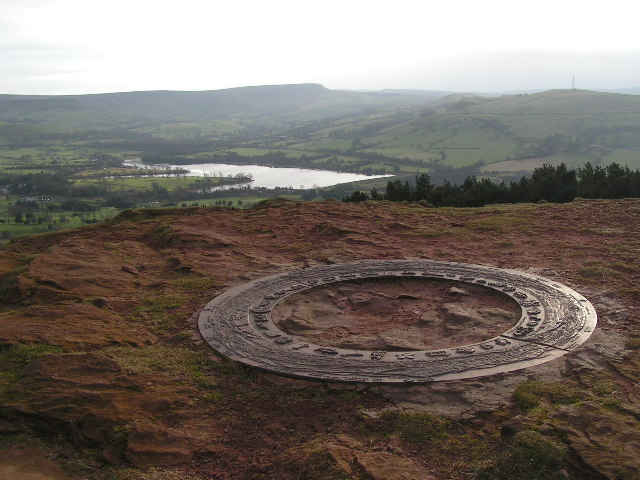
Eccles Pike topograph

At the top of the hill is a commemorative plaque known as a topograph, showing a 360° relief of the surrounding landscape, placed by the community to mark the millennium. In early November 2011, the topograph was stolen. On 7 May 2013, it was replaced with one made from less valuable metal to discourage future theft.
