= List of hills in the Peak District =

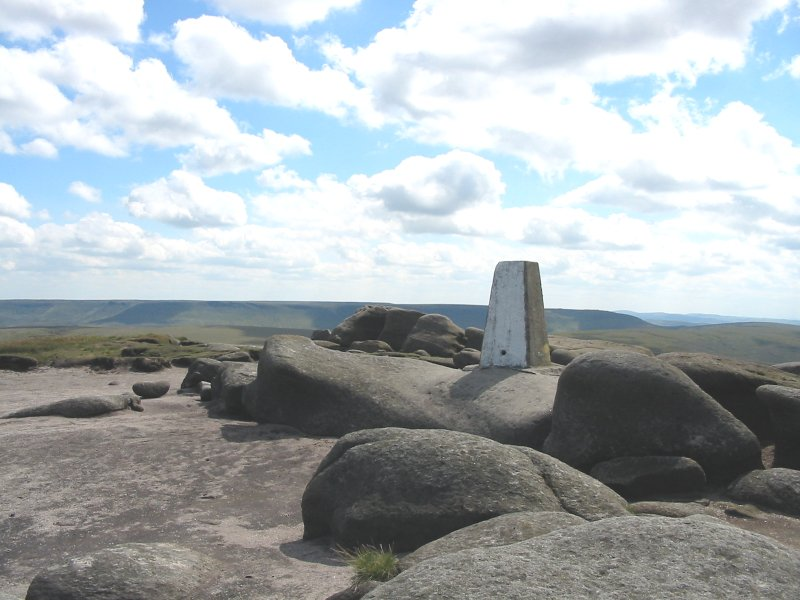
Higher Shelf Stones

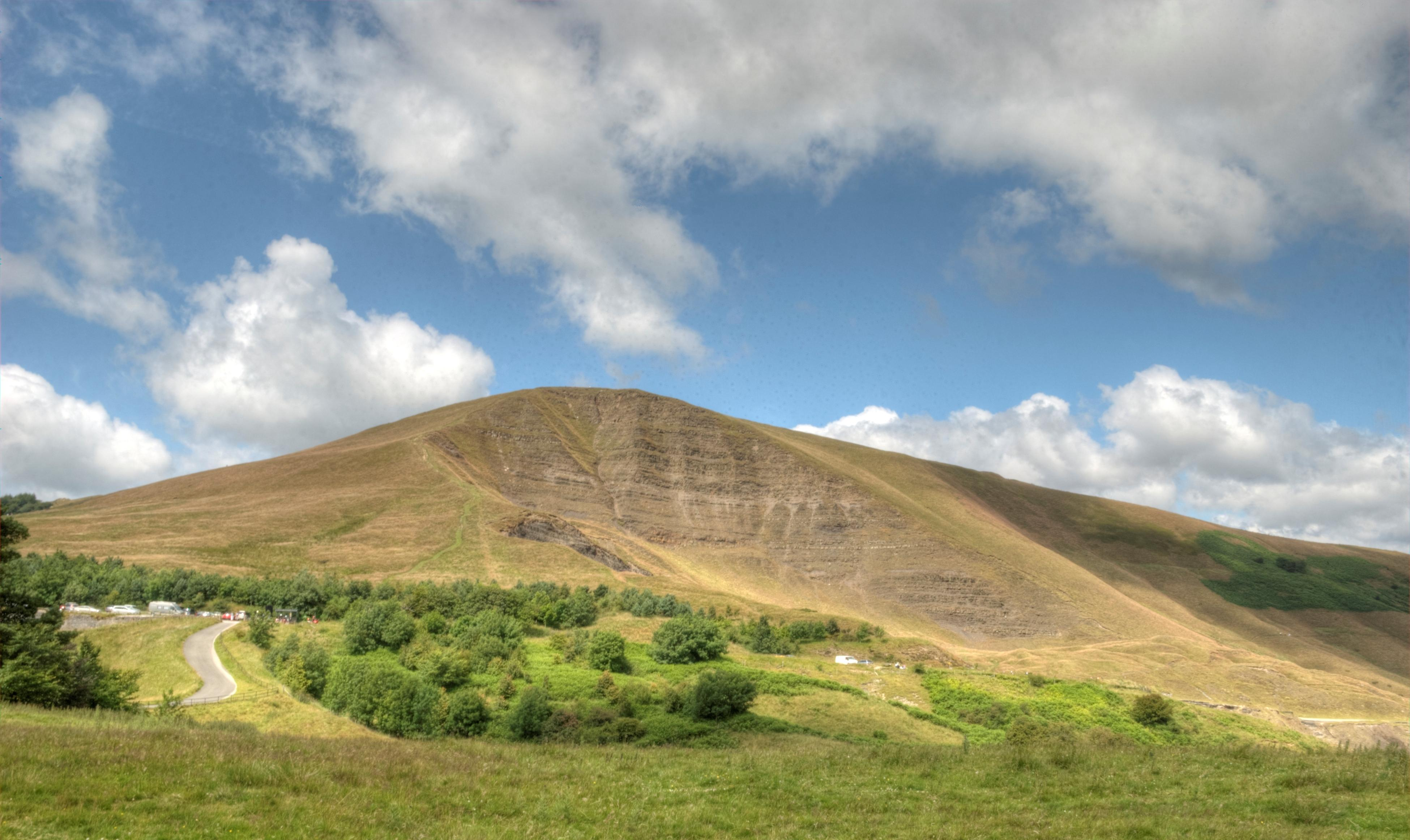
Mam Tor

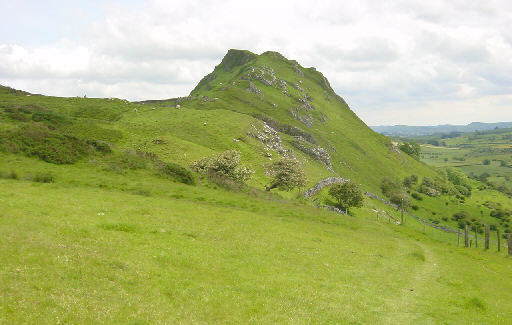
Chrome Hill

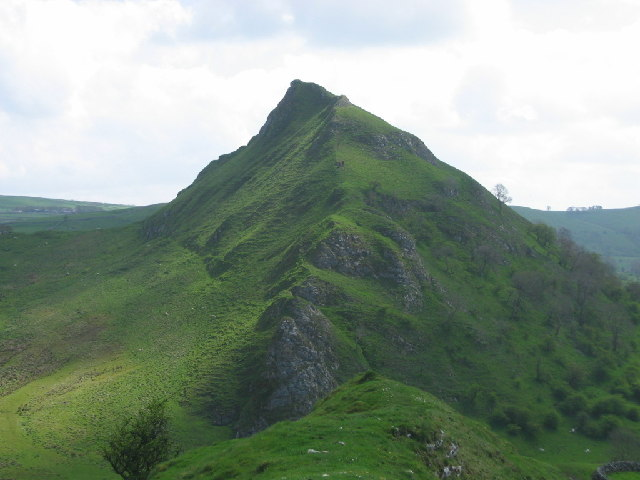
Parkhouse Hill

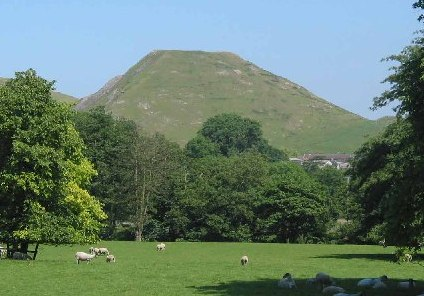
Thorpe Cloud

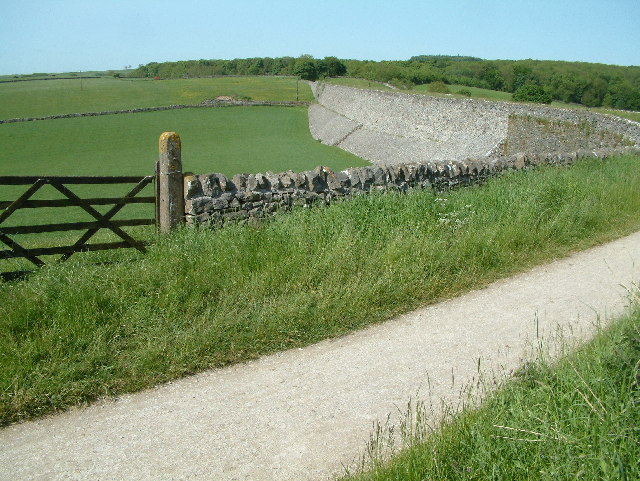
Minninglow Hill

This is a partial list of the hills of the Peak District of England. Most lie within the Peak District National Park, but others lie outside its boundaries. The list is sorted by absolute height, then by relative height. Marilyns are marked in boldface. Kinder Scout and Bleaklow are the Peak District's only mountains, with summit elevations over 600 m and rising more than 30 m above the surrounding land (although by other definitions Bleaklow does not meet the prominence threshold of a mountain).

Peak	Absolute height (m)	Relative height (m)	Grid reference
**Kinder Scout**	**636**	**496.6**	**SK084875**
Bleaklow	633	128	SK094960
Higher Shelf Stones	621	15	SK089948
Grindslow Knoll	601	15	SK110868
**Black Hill**	**582**	**165**	**SE078046**
Brown Knoll	569	36	SK083851
**Shining Tor**	**559**	**236**	**SJ994737**
Axe Edge Moor	551	84	SK035706
Lord's Seat	550	62	SK111834
Whetstone Ridge	547	40	SK001708
Margery Hill	546	19	SK189956
Featherbed Moss	545	10	SE046011
Featherbed Top	544	c. 32	SK090920
Mill Hill	544	32	SK061904
Black Chew Head	542	35	SE056019
Back Tor	538	67	SK197909
Alport Moor	535	24	SK120945
White Low	530	23	SE086021
Britland Edge Hill	523	c. 20	SE106027
Cheeks Hill	522	5	SK026697
Cats Tor	522	38	SJ995759
Lost Lad	519	10	SK193912
Mam Tor	517	62	SK127836
Oliver Hill	513	45	SK027675
Black Edge	507	99	SK062770
Shutlingsloe	506	134	SJ976695
The Roaches	505	123	SK001638
Combs Head	503	41	SK041757
Burbage Edge	500	25	SK029732
West Nab	500	c. 50	SE076088
Dead Edge End	499	c. 25	SE124017
Ashway Moss	497	c. 20	SE033046
South Head	494	38	SK060845
Merryton Low	489	c. 54	SK041610
Pike Low (Langsett)	478	c. 20	SK209974
Slitherstone Hill	477	c. 70	SK123819
Lose Hill	476	76	SK153854
Snailsden Pike End	475	c. 20	SE132034
Bradwell Moor	471	c. 50	SK132801
Eldon Hill	470	31	SK115811
Win Hill	464	145	SK186850
Ramshaw Rocks	460	32	SK020624
High Neb	458	108	SK227853
Chinley Churn	457	127	SK036843
Ann Roach	454	27	SK021655
Foxlow Edge	452	35	SK004756
Hollins Hill	451	62	SK060679
Chelmorton Low	446	63	SK114706
Stanedge Pole	438	c. 24	SK247844
Sough Top (Taddington Moor)	438	c. 20	SK133709
Corbar Hill	437	c. 20	SK051743
Higger Tor	434	c. 15	SK257819
Grin Low	434	48	SK054718
Chrome Hill	433	61	SK070673
Sir William Hill (Eyam Moor)	429	122	SK215778
Rud Hill	424	c. 15	SK270842
High Wheeldon	422	c. 25	SK100660
Snels Low	419	c. 25	SK113818
Shatton Edge (Burton Bole)	417	55	SK195807
Durham Edge (Abney Moor)	416	c. 40	SK180794
Sponds Hill	413	72	SJ970802
Cown Edge	411	85	SK021920
Black Hill (Whaley Moor)	411	105	SJ989821
Gautries Hill	410	37	SK099810
Hen Cloud	410	60	SK008615
Pike Low (Derwent)	405	11	SK180898
Bole Hill (Wormhill Moor)	403	66	SK107757
Croker Hill	402	98	SJ933677
Revidge	400	40	SK077599
Gradbach Hill	399	43	SK000653
Brittain's Plantation	398	c. 50	SK278930
Aleck Low	398	53	SK173595
Pilsbury Lodge	395	c. 40	SK121639
Totley Moor	395	c. 17	SK285788
Longstone Moor	391	c. 110	SK189733
Emlin	389	c. 10	SK240934
Houndkirk Hill	389	c. 10	SK284818
Wolfscote Hill	388	102	SK136583
**Gun**	**385**	**168**	**SJ970615**
Rock Hall	383	16	SK227772
Crook Hill	382	c. 84	SK183872
Hawks Low	382	c. 35	SK170570
Pikenaze Hill	382	15	SE105004
Tegg's Nose	380	c. 30	SJ947725
Carder Low	380	58	SK130626
Waggon Low	380	c. 16	SK116647
Harborough Rocks	379	65	SK243553
Parkhouse Hill	375	53	SK079669
Lantern Pike	373	c. 88	SK025882
Minninglow Hill	372	c. 58	SK209573
Wetton Hill	372	c. 55	SK104563
Beeley Moor	371	84	SK293686
Eccles Pike	370	c. 132	SK035812
Ecton Hill	369	82	SK100580
Wardlow Hay Cop	370	c. 47	SK179740
Slipper Low	368	c. 30	SK227569
Blakelow Hill	367	69	SK255594
Big Moor	367	19	SK260764
Narrowdale Hill	367	72	SK123573
Gratton Hill	364	53	SK132572
Hartcliff Hill	364	83	SE221018
The Height	359	c. 30	SK250973
Middleton Moor	358	60	SK268556
Soles Hill	356	63	SK097525
Bole Hill (Burton Moor)	356	c. 50	SK184676
High Field	354	c. 50	SK162724
Abney Low	347	c. 45	SK202794
**The Cloud**	**343**	**170**	**SJ904636**
Masson Hill	338	53	SK285587
Gibraltar Rocks	335	c. 25	SK249909
Blake Low	330	c. 28	SK220602
Low Moor	330	c. 10	SK183642
Bunster Hill	329	24	SK141516
Fin Cop	327	c. 90	SK175709
Stanton Moor	323	c. 108	SK245629
Bolehill (Cromford Moor)	323	c. 105	SK294554
Wire Stone	318	c. 10	SK321634
Alport Height	314	c. 67	SK305515
Kerridge Hill	313	71	SJ942759
Bole Hill (Lodge Moor)	312	c. 15	SK290856
Ughill Height	311	c. 15	SK263907
Allman Well Hill	310	c. 25	SK281968
Birchen Edge (Nelson's Monument)	310	c. 23	SK278731
Lees Moor	304	c. 142	SK249674
Hare Edge Hill	304	c. 16	SK303727
Thorpe Cloud	287	79	SK151510
Rainster Rocks	287	c. 10	SK220547
Calver Peak	285	20	SK229742
High Low	281	30	SK221802
Haven Hill	276	c. 15	SK212519
Harthill Moor	272	c. 100	SK210627
Wibben Hill	249	c. 10	SK184523

== Hills within the National Park with 30 metres of prominence ==
1. Kinder Scout (636.3m)
2. Bleaklow Head (633m)
3. Black Hill (581.1m)
4. Brown Knoll (569m)
5. Shining Tor (559m)
6. Axe Edge Moor (551m)
7. Howden Edge (550m)
8. Lord's Seat (550m)
9. Whetstone Ridge (547m)
10. Featherbed Top (544m)
11. Mill Hill (544m)
12. Black Chew Head (542m)
13. Back Tor (538m)
14. Horse Stone Naze (527m)
15. Cats Tor (522m)
16. Mam Tor (517m)
17. Oliver Hill (513m)
18. Black Edge (506.7m)
19. Shutlingsloe (506m)
20. The Roaches (505m)
21. Combs Head (503m)
22. West Nab (501m)
23. South Head (494m)
24. Merryton Low (489m)
25. Whitehills (478.3m)
26. Slitherstone Hill (477.5m)
27. Lose Hill (476m)
28. Mount Famine (473m)
29. Bradwell Moor (471m)
30. Eldon Hill (470.7m)
31. Win Hill (463.4m)
32. High Edge (462m)
33. The Tower (460m)
34. Birchenough Hill (459m)
35. High Neb (458m)
36. Chinley Churn (457m)
37. White Path Moss (457m)
38. Thirkelow Rocks (451m)
39. Hollins Hill (450m)
40. Chelmorton Low (446m)
41. Upper Hey (446m)
42. Chrome Hill (439.2m)
43. Dow Low (437m)
44. Sir William Hill (429m)
45. Bamford Moor (426m)
46. Barker Bank (426m)
47. High Wheeldon (422m)
48. Shatton Edge (417m)
49. Durham Edge (416m)
50. Sponds Hill (413m)
51. Cown Edge (411m)
52. Gautries Hill (410m)
53. Hen Cloud (410m)
54. Waggonshaw Brow (410m)
55. Lodge Moor (409m)
56. Ely Brow (403.4m)
57. Bole Hill (403m)
58. Revidge (401m)
59. Gradbach Hill (399m)
60. Aleck Low (398m)
61. Edge Mount (396m)
62. Longstone Moor (395m)
63. Pilsbury Hill (395m)
64. Lean Low (394m)
65. Charles Head (393m)
66. Bridge-end Pasture (391.1m)
67. End Low (391m)
68. High Rake (391m)
69. Wolfscote Hill (388m)
70. Bosley Minn (385.9m)
71. Gun (385.2m)
72. Priestcliffe Low (384m)
73. Crook Hill (382m)
74. Hawks Low (382m)
75. Matley Moor (382m)
76. Bruntmoor (381.5m)
77. Aldery Cliff (380m)
78. Carder Low (380m)
79. Sheen Hill (380m)
80. Grindon Moor (377m)
81. Parkhouse Hill (375m)
82. Lantern Pike (373m)
83. Johnson's Knoll (372m)
84. Minninglow Hill (372m)
85. Beeley Moor (371m)
86. Wetton Hill (371m)
87. Eccles Pike (370m)
88. Wardlow Hay Cop (370m)
89. Ecton Hill (369m)
90. Tissington Hill (369m)
91. Blakelow Hill (367m)
92. Narrowdale Hill (367m)
93. Gratton Hill (363.9m)
94. Parkhouse Hill North Top (362m)
95. Musden Low (361m)
96. Nab End (361m)
97. The Hills (361m)
98. Wetton Hill SW Top (358m)
99. Bole Hill (356.7m)
100. Soles Hill (356m)
101. High Field (354m)
102. Abney Low (347m)
103. Littonslack Hill (345m)
104. Baley Hill (341.8m)
105. Ilamtops Low (339m)
106. Litton Edge (338.4m)
107. Hazelton Clump (335m)
108. Ossoms Hill (334m)
109. Blake Low (330m)
110. Wetton Low (328.9m)
111. Fin Cop (327m)
112. Billinge Hill (324.7m)
113. Stanton Moor (323m)
114. Stanshope Pasture (313m)
115. Shire Hill (307m)
116. Lees Moor (304m)
117. Lamber Low (298m)
118. Anthony Hill (293m)
119. Thorpe Cloud (287m)
120. High Low (281m)
121. Darlton Quarry (256.9m)
122. Bank Wood Hill (242m)
123. The Folly (235m)
124. Moatlow Knob (232m)
125. Cracknowl Hill (213m)
126. Hare Knoll (185m)

== Hills over 300 metres outside the National Park boundaries ==
The northern boundary with the South Pennines is taken to be Standedge and the watercourses flowing from either side of it, although this is somewhat arbitrary.

1. Hind Low (447m)
2. Pule Hill (437m)
3. Grin Low (434m)
4. High Moor (416.1m)
5. Bee Low (413m)
6. Whaley Moor (411m)
7. Fox Low (407.3m)
8. Croker Hill (404.1m)
9. Wild Bank Hill (399m)
10. Brink (395m)
11. Cheese Gate Nab (385m)
12. Ipstones Edge (384m)
13. Tegg's Nose (382m)
14. Dove Holes Hill (381m)
15. Harboro Rocks (379m)
16. Waterswallows Hill (379m)
17. Weaver Hills (371.3m)
18. Eccles Pike (370m)
19. Wood Royd Hill (370m)
20. Hemmings Low (367.9m)
21. Hartcliff Hill (365m)
22. Whitwell Moor (359m)
23. Longcliffe Hill (358m)
24. Middleton Moor (357.9m)
25. Cowlow Hill (350m)
26. The Cloud (343.4m)
27. Masson Hill (338m)
28. Mow Cop (336.5m)
29. The Bent (335.8m)
30. Mellor Moor (327.8m)
31. Bolehill (323m)
32. Wharncliffe Chase (318.9m)
33. Cocking Tor (317m)
34. Gawsworth Common (316m)
35. Alport Height (315m)
36. Kerridge Hill (313m)
37. Meltham Cop (311.9m)
38. Briery Busk (311m)
39. Swinny Knoll (309m)
40. Harrop Edge (Stalybridge) (305m)

== Sources ==
- Hill Bagging (the online version of the Database of British and Irish Hills)
- GetOutside (Ordnance Survey)
- OL1 Dark Peak area (Map). 1:25000. Explorer. Ordnance Survey.
- OL24 White Peak area (Map). 1:25000. Explorer. Ordnance Survey.
