= List of Ethels =

95 prominent hills in the English Peak District

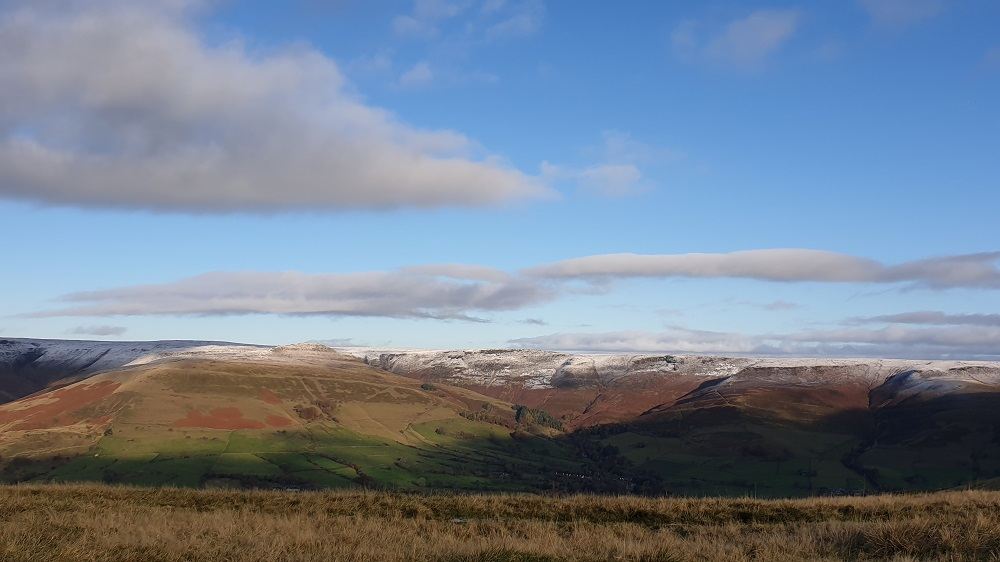
Kinder Scout plateau - County top of Derbyshire

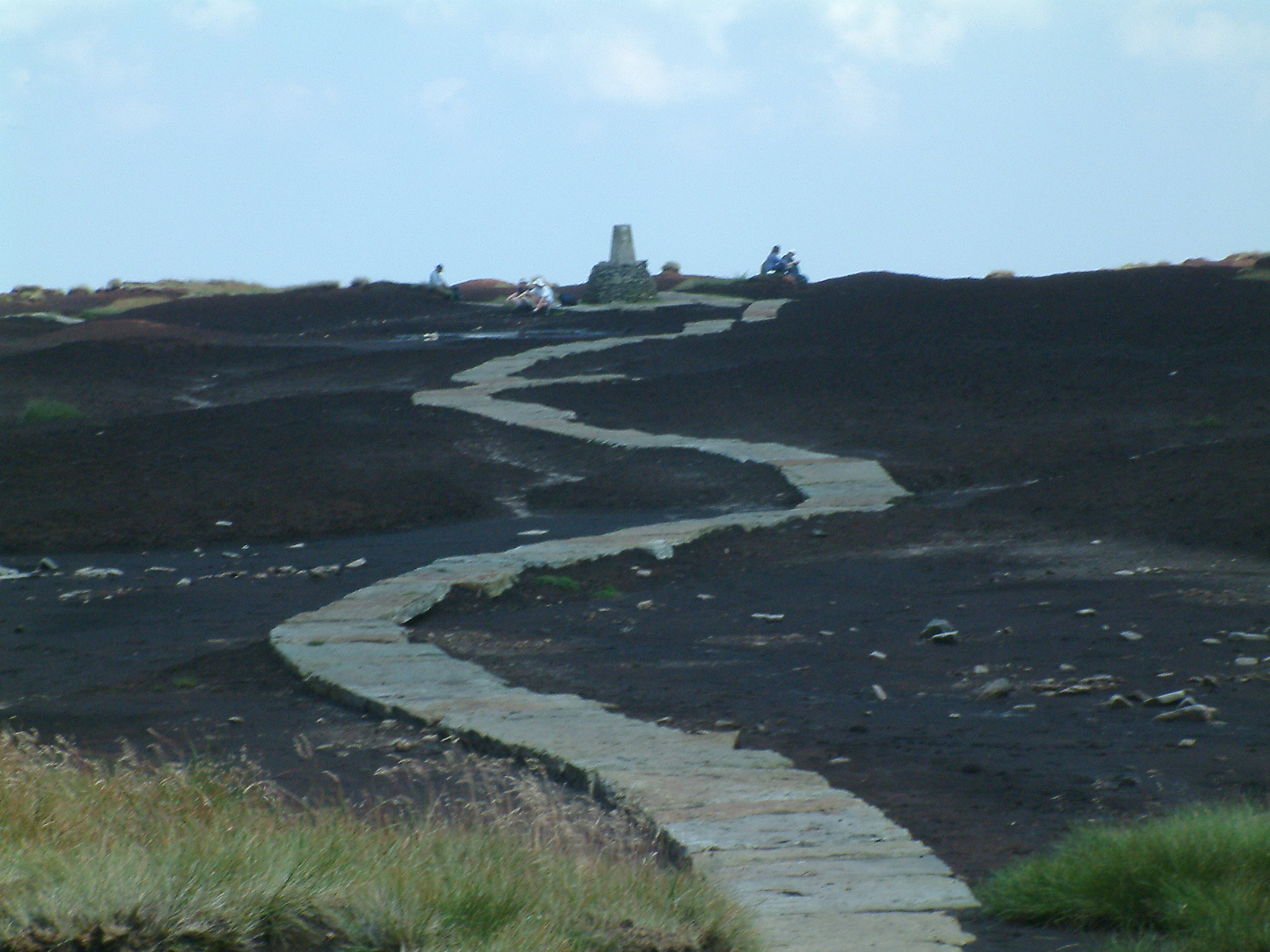
Black Hill - County top of West Yorkshire

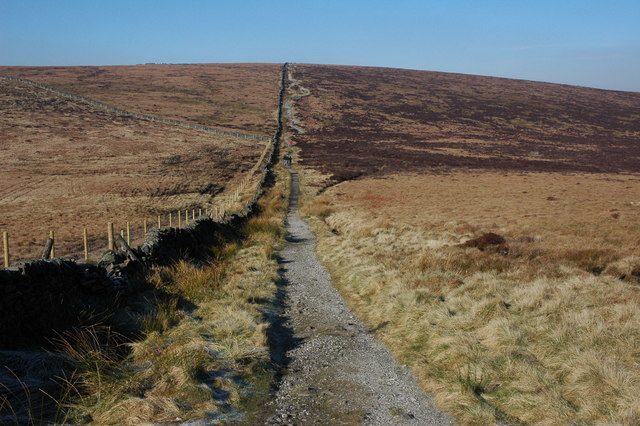
Shining Tor - County top of Cheshire

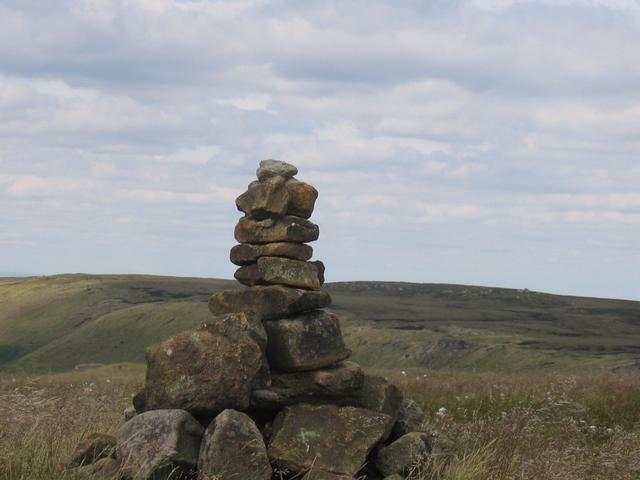
High Stones - County top of South Yorkshire

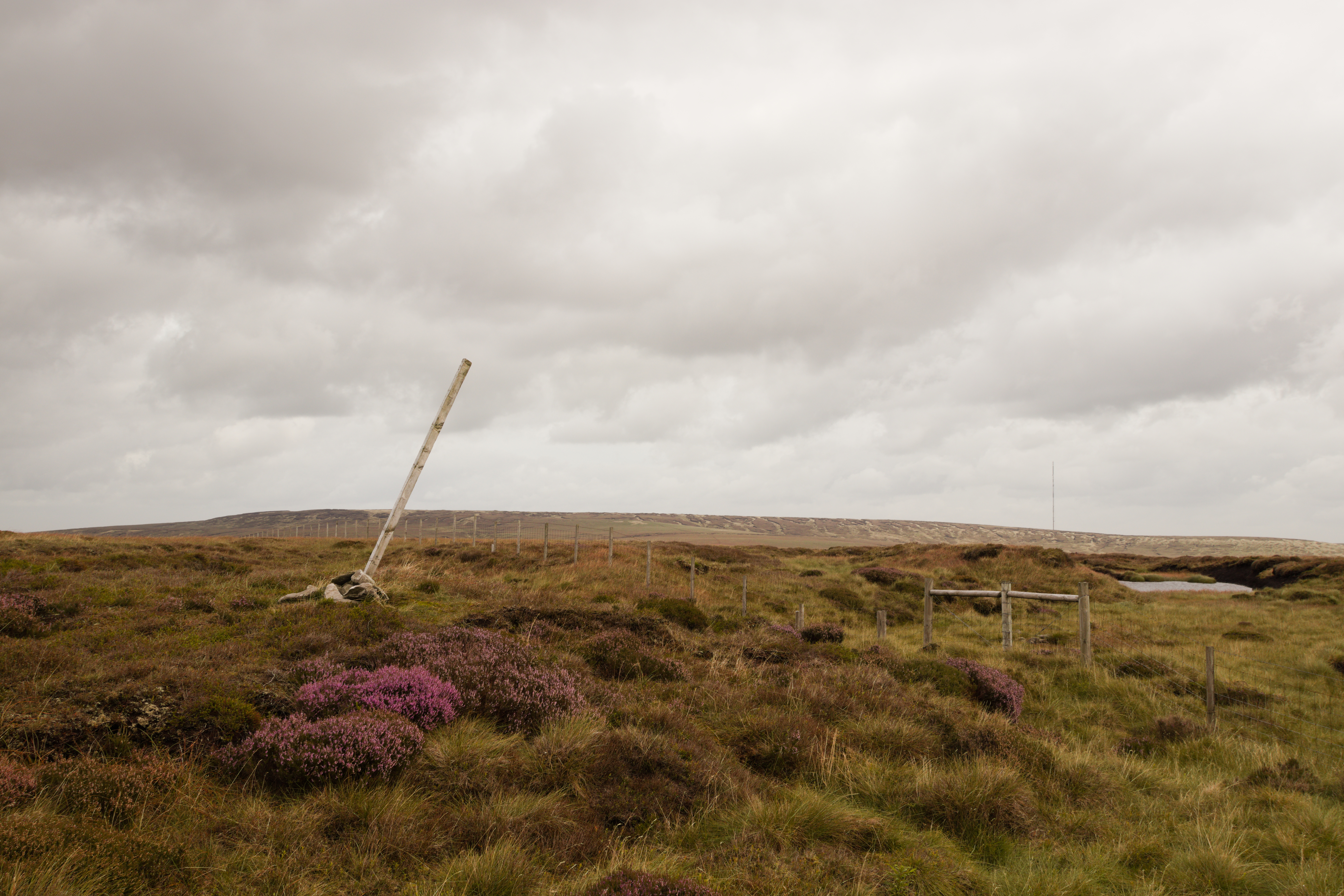
Black Chew Head - County top of Greater Manchester

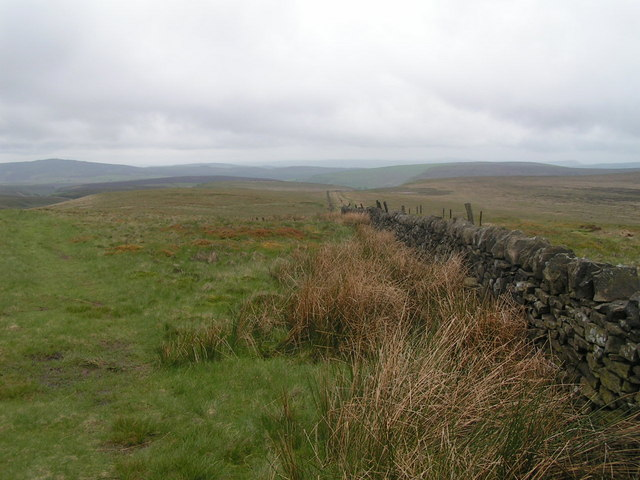
Cheeks Hill - County top of Staffordshire

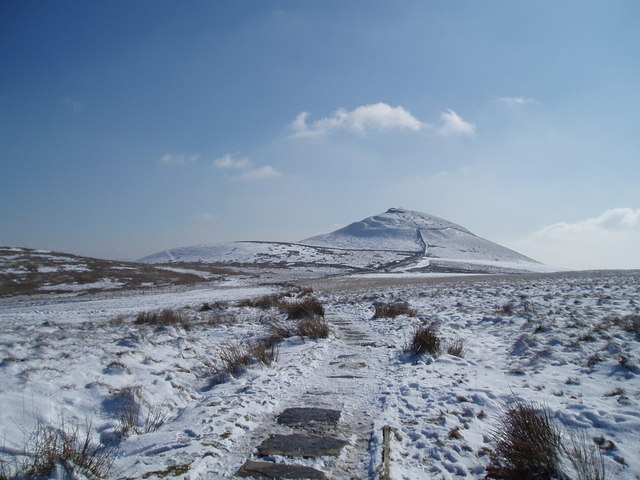
Shutlingsloe

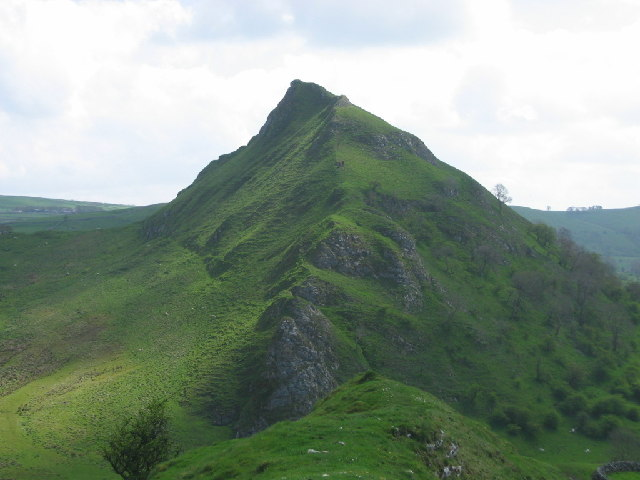
Parkhouse Hill

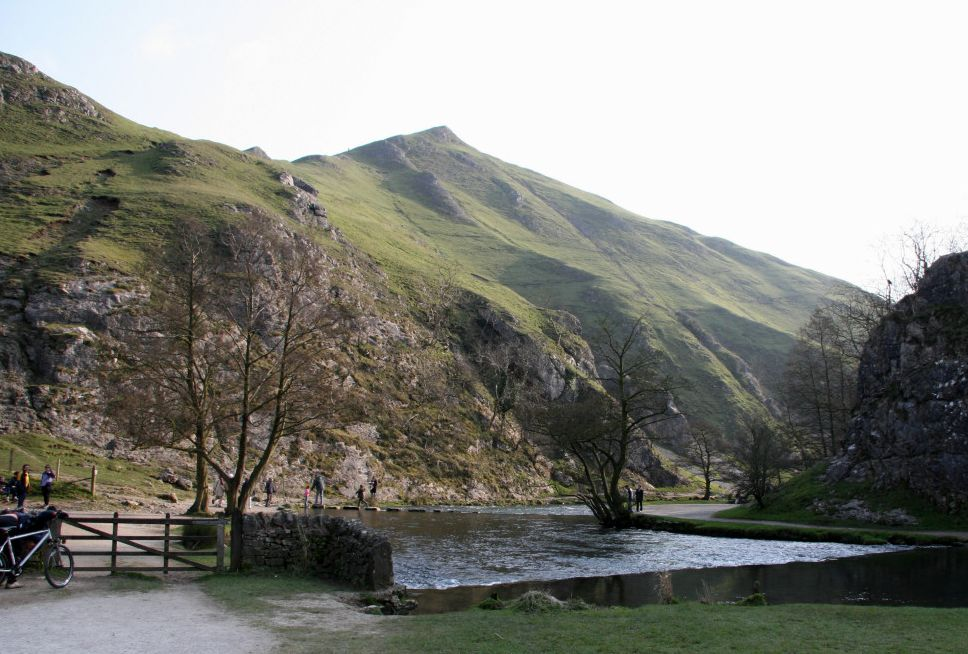
Thorpe Cloud

The Ethels are 95 hills in the Peak District of England, mostly over 400 m (1,300 ft) above sea level but including various prominent lower hills. The Ethels are a tribute to Ethel Haythornthwaite who pioneered the establishment of the Peak District as Britain's first national park in 1951.

The Peak District and South Yorkshire branch of the CPRE countryside charity announced The Ethels in May 2021. The Ethels were devised in early 2021 by CPRE volunteer Doug Colton, who then built the Ethel Ready smartphone app for hill bagging. The Ethels are recognised by the Database of British and Irish Hills, and are identified as "E" in the hill descriptions.

Most of the Ethels lie within the Peak District National Park, but others lie outside its borders. The list is sorted by height above sea level. Marilyns are marked in boldface.

Name	Height (m)	Prominence (m)	Grid reference	County
**Kinder Scout**	**636**	**497**	**SK084875**	Derbyshire
Bleaklow	633	128	SK094960	Derbyshire
Higher Shelf Stones	621	15	SK089948	Derbyshire
Grindslow Knoll	601	15	SK110868	Derbyshire
**Black Hill**	**582**	**165**	**SE078046**	Derbyshire / West Yorkshire
Brown Knoll	569	36	SK083851	Derbyshire
**Shining Tor**	**559**	**236**	**SJ994737**	Cheshire / Derbyshire
Axe Edge Moor	551	84	SK035706	Derbyshire
High Stones (Howden Edge)	550	62	SK187943	South Yorkshire
Lord's Seat (Rushup Edge)	550	62	SK111834	Derbyshire
Whetstone Ridge	547	40	SK001708	Cheshire
Margery Hill	546	19	SK189956	South Yorkshire
Featherbed Top	544	32	SK090920	Derbyshire
Mill Hill	544	32	SK061904	Derbyshire
Black Chew Head	542	35	SE056019	Greater Manchester
Featherbed Moss	541	10	SE046011	Derbyshire
Back Tor (Derwent Edge)	538	67	SK197909	Derbyshire / South Yorkshire
Alport Moor	535	24	SK120946	Derbyshire
White Low	530	23	SE086021	Derbyshire
Britland Edge Hill	523	20	SE106026	Derbyshire / West Yorkshire
Cheeks Hill	520	10	SK026699	Derbyshire / Staffordshire
Cats Tor	518	35	SJ995759	Cheshire / Derbyshire
Lost Lad	518	10	SK193912	Derbyshire / South Yorkshire
Mam Tor	517	62	SK127836	Derbyshire
Oliver Hill	513	45	SK027675	Staffordshire
Black Edge (Combs Moss)	507	99	SK062770	Derbyshire
Shutlingsloe	506	134	SJ976695	Cheshire
The Roaches	505	120	SK001638	Staffordshire
Combs Head	503	41	SK041757	Derbyshire
Burbage Edge (Goyt's Moss)	500	25	SK029732	Derbyshire
West Nab	500	50	SE076088	West Yorkshire
Dead Edge End	499	25	SE124017	Derbyshire / South Yorkshire
Ashway Moss	497	20	SE033046	Greater Manchester
South Head	494	44	SK060845	Derbyshire
Merryton Low	489	54	SK041610	Staffordshire
Slitherstone Hill	477	70	SK123819	Derbyshire
Snailsden Pike End	477	20	SE132034	South Yorkshire
Lose Hill	476	76	SK153854	Derbyshire
Mount Famine	473	44	SK056849	Derbyshire
High Edge	472	64	SK063688	Derbyshire
Bradwell Moor	471	50	SK132801	Derbyshire
Eldon Hill	470	20	SK115811	Derbyshire
Alphin Pike	469	10	SE002028	Greater Manchester
Win Hill	462	144	SK186850	Derbyshire
Ramshaw Rocks	460	32	SK020624	Staffordshire
High Neb (Stanage Edge)	458	103	SK227853	Derbyshire
Chinley Churn	457	127	SK036843	Derbyshire
White Path Moss	457	34	SK251830	Derbyshire
Foxlow Edge	452	35	SK004756	Derbyshire
Hollins Hill	451	62	SK060679	Derbyshire
Chelmorton Low	446	63	SK114706	Derbyshire
Sough Top (Taddington Moor)	438	20	SK133709	Derbyshire
Stanedge Pole	438	24	SK247844	Derbyshire / South Yorkshire
Corbar Hill	437	20	SK051743	Derbyshire
Higger Tor	434	15	SK257819	Derbyshire
Grin Low	430	45	SK054718	Derbyshire
Sir William Hill (Eyam Moor)	429	122	SK215778	Derbyshire
Chrome Hill	425	45	SK070673	Derbyshire
High Wheeldon	422	25	SK100660	Derbyshire
Burton Bole (Shatton Moor)	417	48	SK195807	Derbyshire
Durham Edge (Abney Moor)	416	40	SK180794	Derbyshire
Sponds Hill	413	72	SJ970802	Cheshire
Cown Edge	411	85	SK021920	Derbyshire
Black Hill (Whaley Moor)	410	105	SJ989821	Cheshire
Gautries Hill	410	85	SK099810	Derbyshire
Hen Cloud	410	60	SK008615	Staffordshire
Croker Hill	402	98	SJ933677	Cheshire
Revidge	400	40	SK077599	Staffordshire
Aleck Low	398	53	SK173595	Derbyshire
Longstone Moor	395	110	SK189733	Derbyshire
Pilsbury Hill	395	40	SK121639	Derbyshire
Wolfscote Hill	388	100	SK136583	Derbyshire
**Gun**	**385**	**168**	**SJ970615**	Staffordshire
Crook Hill	382	84	SK183872	Derbyshire
Carder Low	380	58	SK130626	Derbyshire
Harborough Rocks	379	65	SK243553	Derbyshire
Lantern Pike	373	88	SK025882	Derbyshire
Minninglow	372	58	SK209573	Derbyshire
Wetton Hill	372	55	SK104563	Staffordshire
Harland Edge (Beeley Moor)	371	88	SK293687	Derbyshire
Eccles Pike	370	132	SK035812	Derbyshire
Wardlow Hay Cop	370	47	SK179740	Derbyshire
Ecton Hill	369	82	SK100580	Staffordshire
Tissington Hill	369	95	SK151526	Derbyshire
Blakelow Hill (Bonsall Moor)	367	69	SK255594	Derbyshire
Musden Low	361	63	SK118500	Staffordshire
Parkhouse Hill	360	35	SK079669	Derbyshire
Bole Hill (Burton Moor)	356	50	SK184676	Derbyshire
**The Cloud**	**343**	**170**	**SJ904636**	Cheshire / Staffordshire
Fin Cop	327	90	SK175709	Derbyshire
Stanton Moor	323	108	SK245629	Derbyshire
Bolehill (Cromford Moor)	323	105	SK294554	Derbyshire
Lees Moor	304	142	SK249674	Derbyshire
Thorpe Cloud	287	79	SK151510	Derbyshire
Harthill Moor	272	100	SK210627	Derbyshire

The Ethels featured on BBC North West TV broadcasts on 27 May 2021 and 7 Sep 2021. Clare Balding presented '95 Ethels in the Peak District' on the Ramblings programme on BBC Radio 4 on 10 Mar 2022. The Ethels were featured in the Peak District episode of Countryfile on BBC One on 15 Dec 2024.

Rebecca Hormann running between Burbage Edge and Corbar Hill in October 2026

Rob Gittens (of Macclesfield Harriers) ran a continuous round of all 95 Ethels in August 2025, covering 498 km (309 mi) in 7 days and 13 hours. In April 2026 Ben Dalton completed a 518 km (322 mi) route over 10 days to all 95 Ethels wearing a pair of barefoot sandals. In October 2026, ultra runner Rebecca Hormann ran a 275 mi (443 km) continuous round covering all 95 Ethels in 108 hours.

== See also ==
- List of hills in the Peak District
- Lists of mountains and hills in the British Isles
- List of Wainwrights in the Lake District
