= Featherbed (disambiguation) =

A tick mattress is a large bag made of strong, stiff, tightly-woven material.

Featherbed may also refer to:

- A type of mattress topper filled with feathers and/or down; see bed base for history.
- A featherbed bog, a type of peatland forming in particular conditions.
- The featherbed frame, a type of motorcycle frame originally designed for performance racing, named for the improvements in comfort it was felt to provide.
- Featherbedding, the practice of hiring more workers than necessary to do a job.
- Featherbed Moss, a hill in England's Peak District.
- Featherbed Top, another hill in England's Peak District.
- Featherbed Alley Printshop, a printing museum in St George's, Bermuda.
- Barry Manilow, an American singer who used the alias "Featherbed" during his early career
