= South Head =

South Head may refer to:

- South Head (Peak District) a hill in Derbyshire, England.
- South Head, New South Wales part of the Sydney Heads.
- South Kaipara Head a peninsula in the North Island of New Zealand.
- South Head (Manukau Heads), the northernmost point of the Āwhitu Peninsula in Auckland, New Zealand
