= Croker Hill =

Hill in Cheshire, England

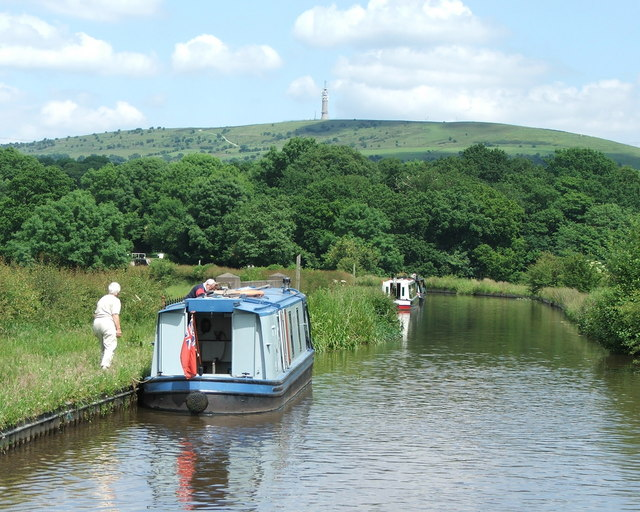
- View of Croker Hill from Bosley Locks

Highest point
- Elevation: 404.1 m (1,326 ft)
- Prominence: 95.1 m (312 ft)
- Parent peak: Shining Tor (559m)
- Listing: List of hills in the Peak District
- Coordinates: 53.206133°N 2.1007°W

Geography
- Location: Cheshire, UK
- Parent range: Peak District
- OS grid: SJ933677
- Topo map: OS Landranger 119

Croker Hill, also known as Sutton Common, stands just outside the western edge of the Peak District national park, overlooking Congleton in Cheshire, England. Near the summit stands the Sutton Common BT Tower, built during the 1960s. It has an elevation of 404.1 m (1,326 ft) and a prominence of 95.1 m (312 ft).

Popular with hill walkers, Croker Hill offers fine views of the Cheshire Plain; on clear days, Manchester city centre and as far away as Snowdon can be seen.

The Gritstone Trail, a long-distance footpath from Disley to Mow Cop, crosses Croker Hill.
