= Gratton Hill =

Hill in Staffordshire, England

Grattton Hill
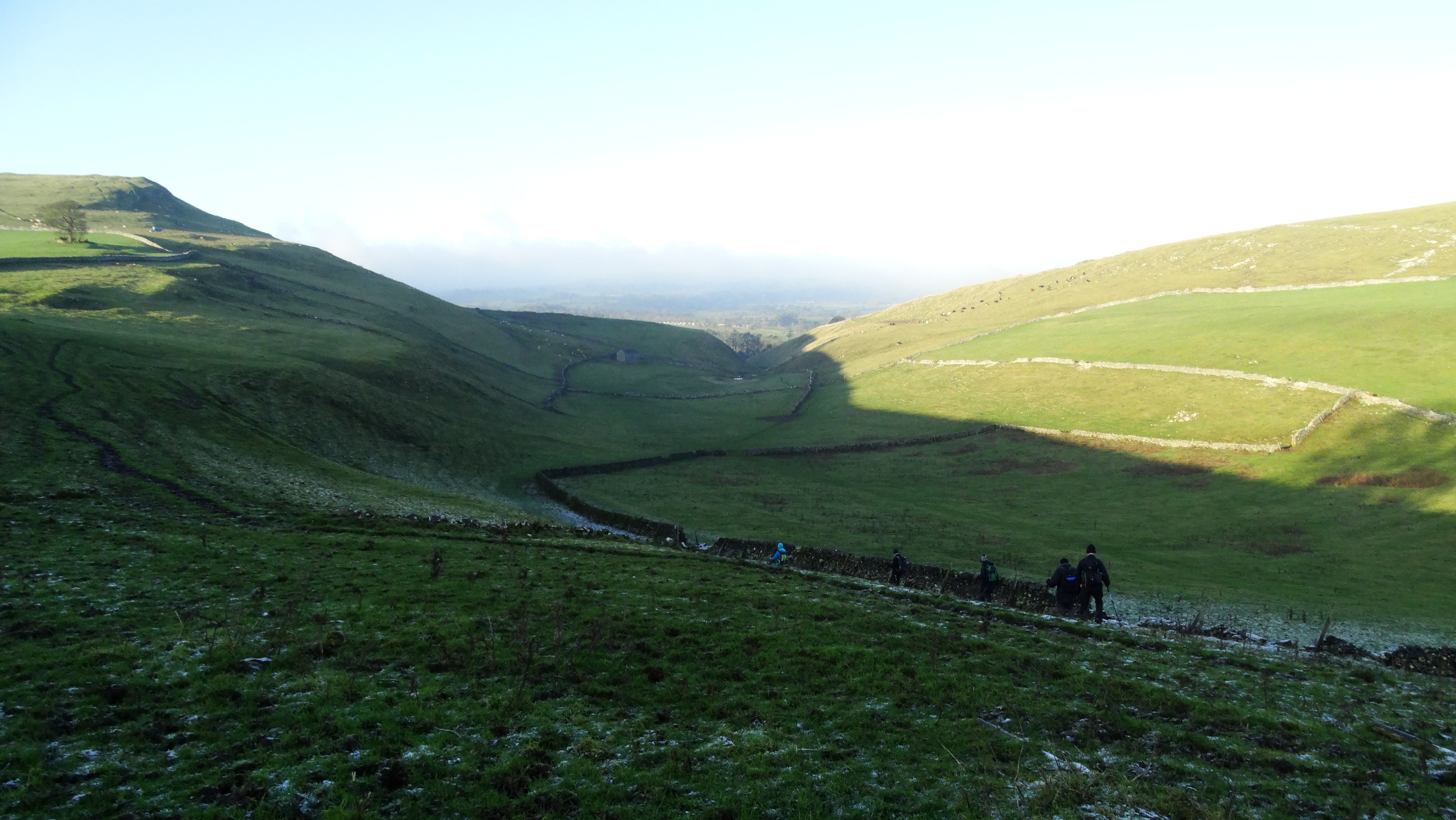
- Looking north towards Narrowdale Hill on the left, and Gratton Hill on the right

Highest point
- Elevation: 364 m (1,194 ft)
- Prominence: 52.8 metres (173 ft)
- Coordinates: 53°06′39″N 1°48′15″W

Geography
- Location within Staffordshire
- Location: Near Alstonefield
- OS grid: SK 13201 57154

Gratton Hill is a geographical feature, a hill about 1 mile (1.6 km) north of Alstonefield and about 2.5 miles (4 km) south-east of Warslow, near the north-east boundary of Staffordshire, England.

== Description ==
Its elevation is 364 metres (1,194 ft), and its prominence is 52.8 metres (173 ft).

Geologically, the hill is a reef knoll. There is a view across the River Dove towards Wolfscote Hill to the north.

=== Bowl barrows ===
There are three prehistoric bowl barrows on Gratton Hill. They are scheduled monuments.

The barrow at the north-west end of the summit is oval, about 12 by 10 metres (39 by 33 ft) and is about 1 metre (3 ft 3 in) high, with a shallow pit at the centre. The barrow just below the summit on the west side is about 9.5 by 10.5 metres (31 by 34 ft) and is about 1 metre (3 ft 3 in) high, with two circular depressions. Both barrows are thought to be unexcavated.

The barrow at the south-eastern end of the summit is about 10 by 8.5 metres (33 by 28 ft) and is about 0.7 metres (2 ft 4 in) high; there is a modern cairn at the centre. There are traces of a ditch on the north-western side. There was some excavation in the 19th century, at the centre, during which were found two human burials, three cremations and three urns.

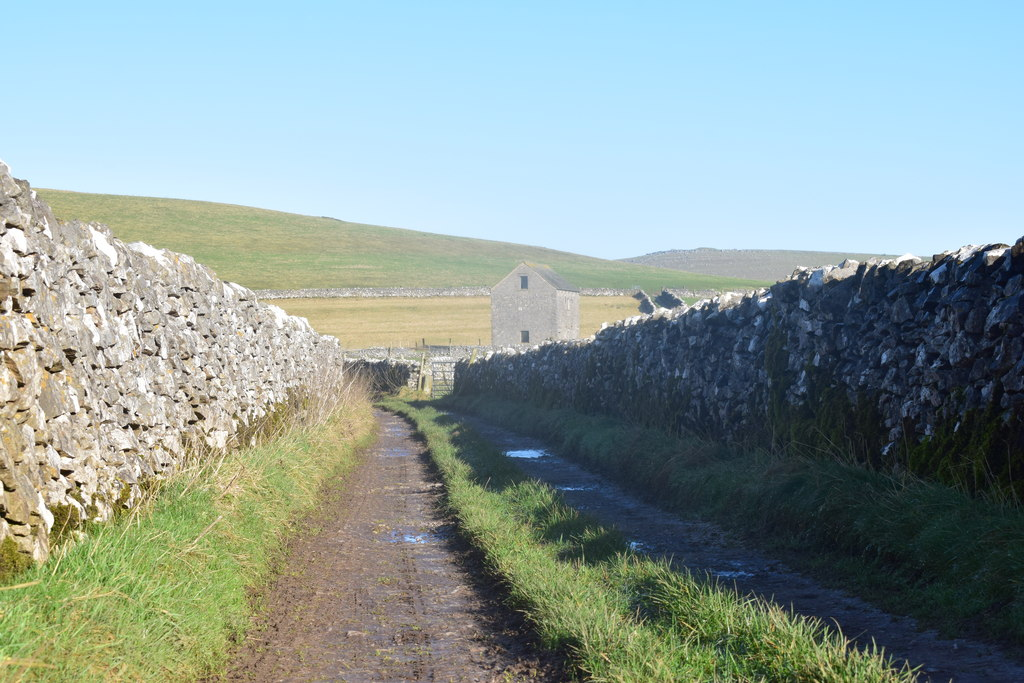
Gratton Hill from the south
