= Mount Famine =

Hill in the Derbyshire Peak District

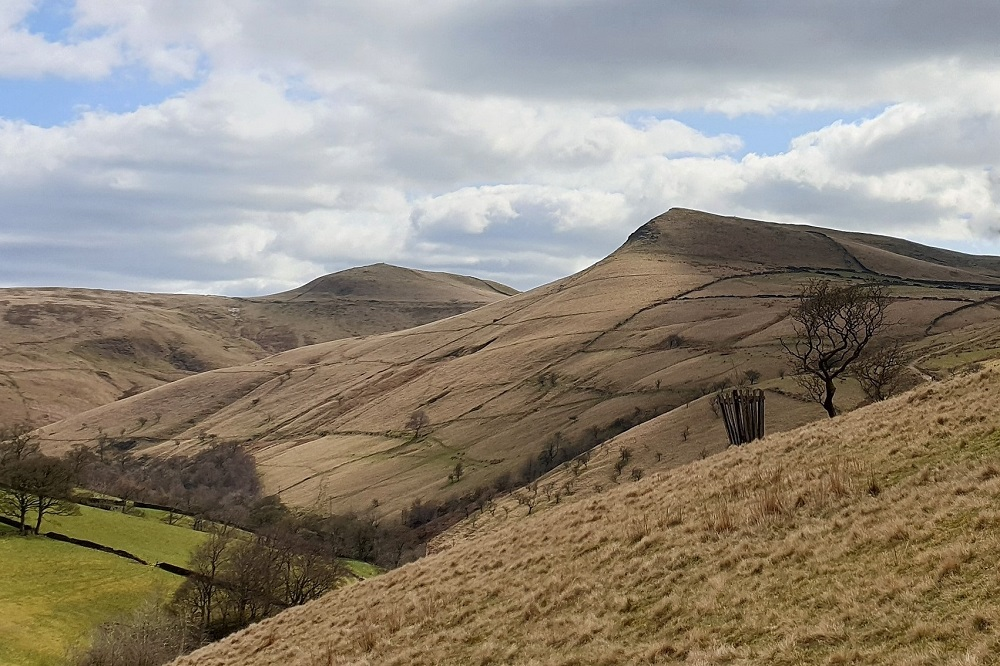
- View from north with South Head on the left

Highest point
- Elevation: 473 metres (1,552 ft)
- Prominence: 44 metres (144 ft)
- Coordinates: 53°21′40″N 1°55′02″W

Geography
- Location: Hayfield, Derbyshire, England
- OS grid: SK056849
- Topo map: OS Explorer OL1

Mount Famine is a gritstone hill between the villages of Hayfield and Chinley in the Derbyshire Peak District, England. The summit is 473 metres (1,552 ft) above sea level. The hill's name originates from the period of the inclosure acts (from the late 18th century) when tenant farmers struggled to make a living from poor farming land.

A round Bronze Age burial mound on the west side of the hill is about 20 metres (66 ft) wide. It was identified by J Barnatt in 2014.

The hilltop area was acquired by the National Trust in 2006 and is designated as access land for the public.

The Pennine Bridleway runs along the south and west sides of Mount Famine. Since 2005, there has been an annual fell race each May from Hayfield around Mount Famine and South Head.

Mount Famine is one of the 95 Ethels hills of the Peak District, launched by the countryside charity CPRE in 2021.
