= Merryton Low =

Hill in Staffordshire, United Kingdom

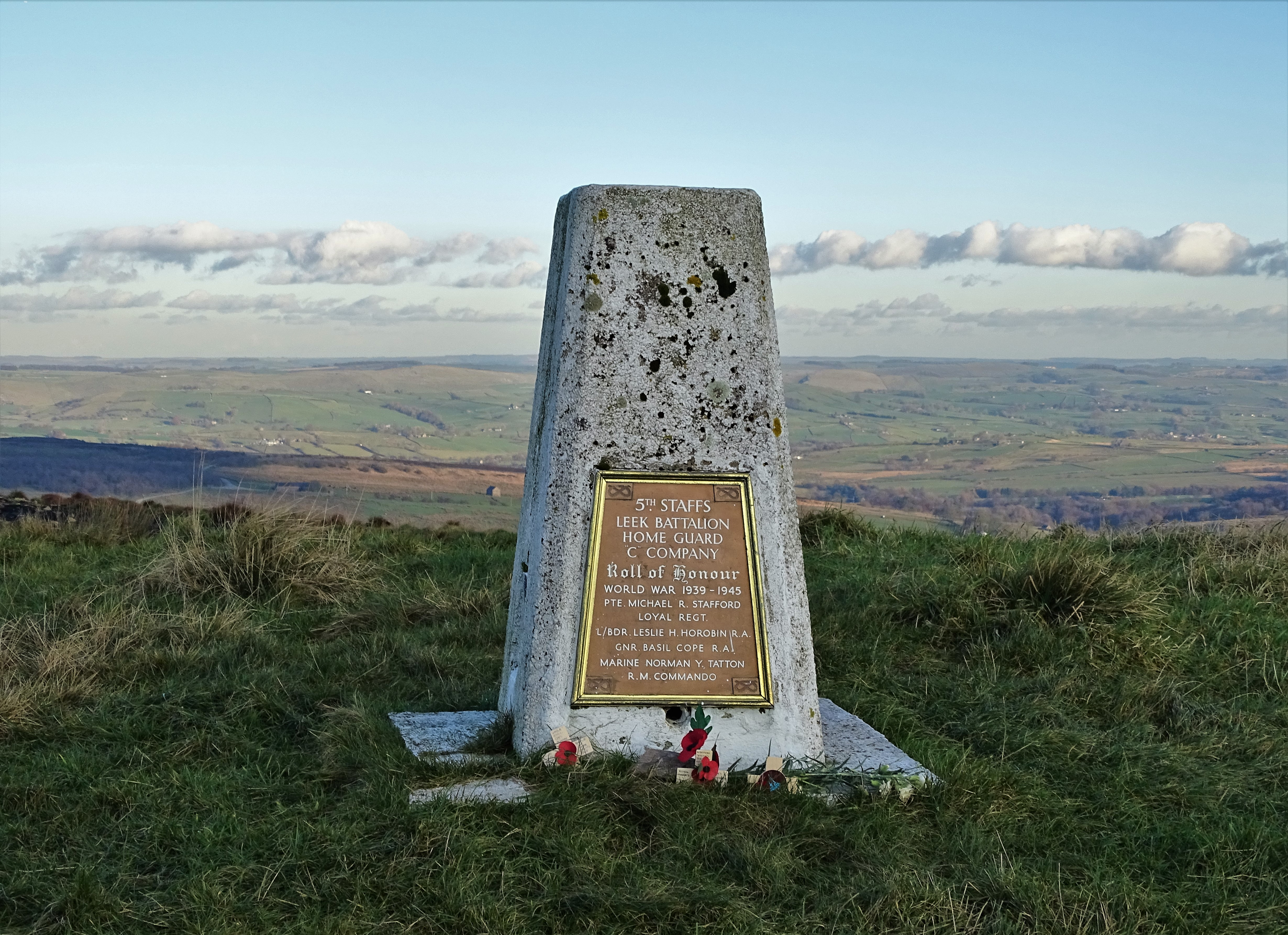
- Trig point with WWII memorial plaque

Highest point
- Elevation: 489 m (1,604 ft)
- Prominence: 53.0 m (174 ft)
- Parent peak: Shining Tor
- Listing: TuMP (400-499m), Clem (Tu,4,Cm)
- Coordinates: 53°08′45″N 1°56′22″W

Geography
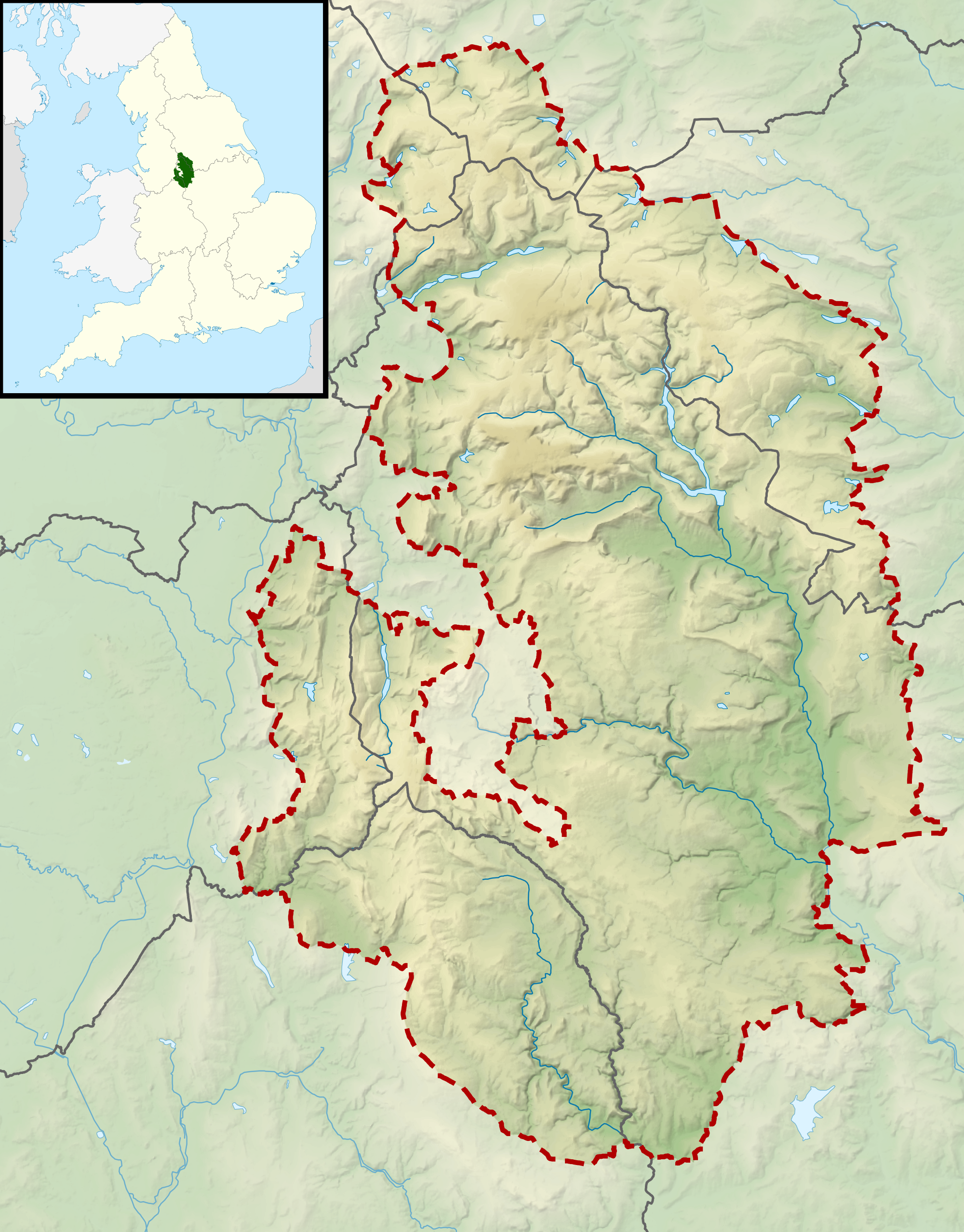
- Location within the Peak District Location within Staffordshire
- Location: Staffordshire, England
- Parent range: Peak District
- OS grid: SK041609
- Topo map: OS (1:50k) 119 (1:25k) OL24W

Merryton Low is a hill in Staffordshire, England, a few miles east of Leek. It is in the civil parish of Fawfieldhead in the local government district of Staffordshire Moorlands.

The hill is 489m / 1604 ft ASL and forms part of the White Peak and is within the Peak District National Park

The parent peak is Shining Tor and it ranks as the 6366th highest peak in the British Isles and the 729th tallest in England

There are two bowl barrows on the hill: Merryton Low bowl barrow, a scheduled monument is at the summit, and another scheduled barrow lies 700m to the south.

The summit trig point is grade II listed as it carries a plaque commemorating four members of the local Home Guard who died on active service in the regular army during World War II. The hill was the site of two fatal air crashes during World War II: a Short Stirling crashed on 13 July 1942 with eight deaths, and a Hawker Hurricane on 27 July 1944 with one death.

The River Hamps rises on its southern slopes.
