= Oliver Hill (Peak District) =

Hill in Staffordshire, England

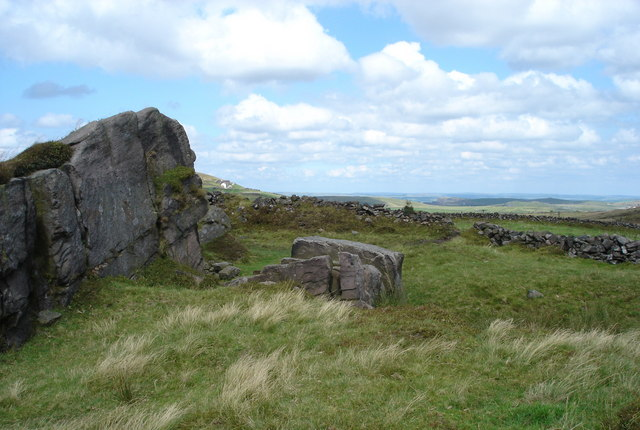
- Near the top of Oliver Hill

Highest point
- Elevation: 513 m (1,683 ft)
- Prominence: 45 m
- Parent peak: Shining Tor
- Listing: Dewey
- Coordinates: 53.2054°N 1.9613°W

Geography
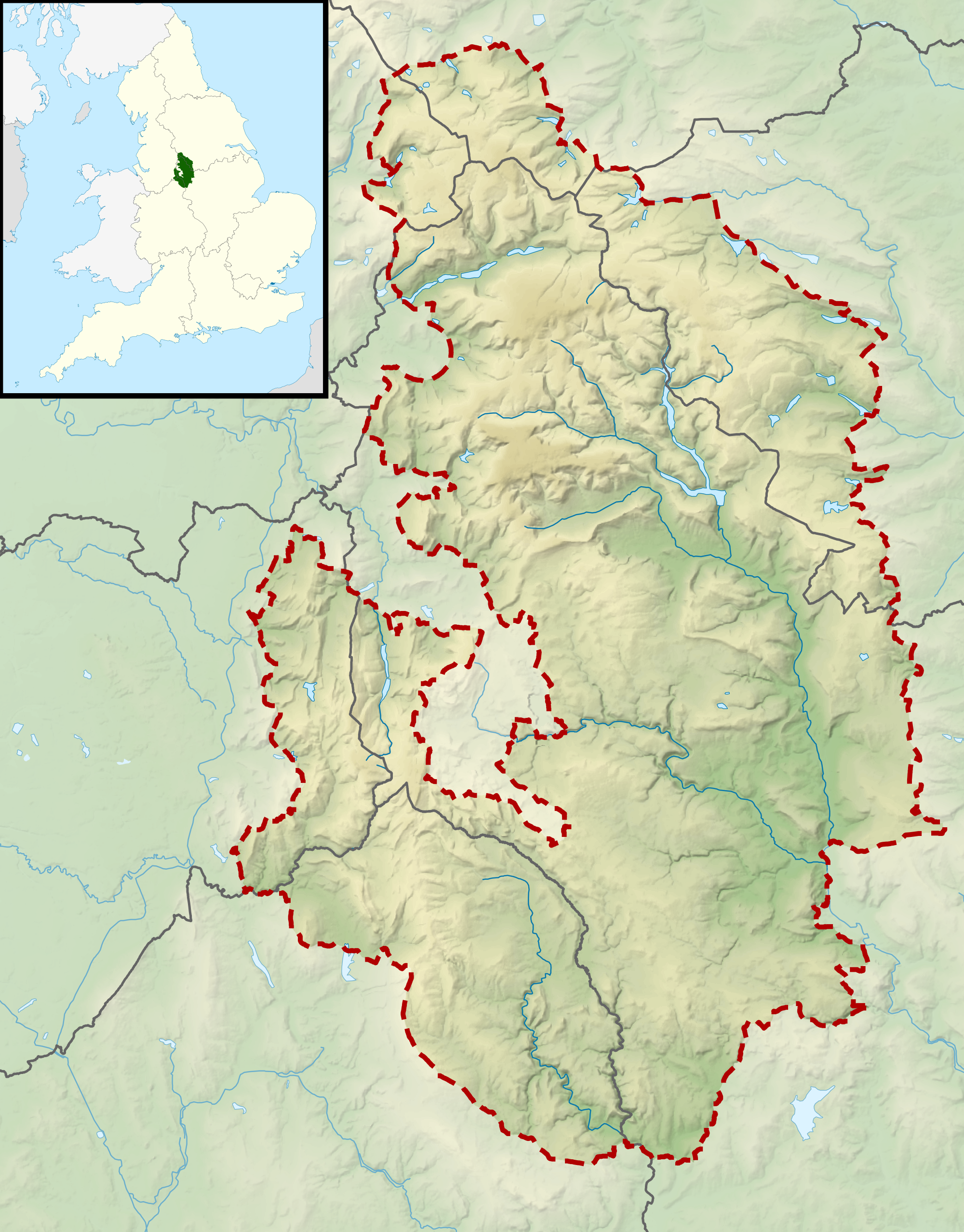
- Location within the Peak District Location within Staffordshire
- Location: Staffordshire, England, UK
- Parent range: Peak District
- OS grid: SK027675
- Topo map: OS Landranger 119; OL24W

Oliver Hill is a hill, 513 metres (1,683 ft) high, in the Peak District in the county of Staffordshire in England. It is a treeless summit surrounded by farmland in the southern part of the Peak District about 6 kilometres (3.7 mi) south-southwest of the town of Buxton. The summit has a tiny cairn near some aerials.
