= Cats Tor =

Hill in Cheshire, England

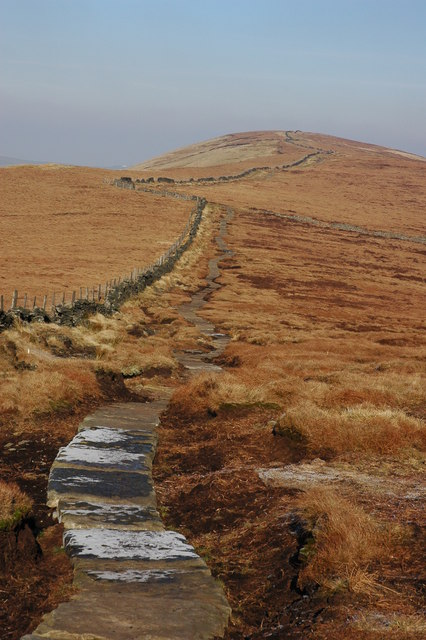
- Paved path to Cats Tor

Highest point
- Elevation: 518 metres (1,699 ft)
- Coordinates: 53°16′48″N 2°00′33″W

Geography
- Location: Cheshire, England
- OS grid: SJ 9948 7590
- Topo map: OS Explorer OL24

Cats Tor is a Peak District hill on the border between Cheshire and Derbyshire, between the towns of Macclesfield and Buxton. The summit is 518 metres (1,699 ft) above sea level. Tor is an Old English word for a high, rocky hill.

The higher peak of Shining Tor is about 2 km south along The Tors gritstone ridge. The ridge continues to the north past Windgather Rocks and Taxal Edge towards Whaley Bridge. On the west wide of the ridge, water drains into Todd Brook which feeds Toddbrook Reservoir. East of Cats Tor are views of the Goyt Valley, Foxlow Edge and Fernilee Reservoir.

The moorland ridge on which Cats Tor lies is designated "Open Access" land for the public, following the Countryside and Rights of Way Act 2000. The closest access is from Pym Chair car park, from where a public footpath, laid on large stone slabs, runs south across Cats Tor and continues south along the ridge to Shining Tor. A local legend tells that Pym Chair is the spot where a highway man called Pym robbed passers by on the packhorse route. Another story is that Pym was a preacher who gave sermons there.

The open gritstone moorlands of the Upper Goyt Valley (Wild Moor, Goyt's Moss, Burbage Edge, Shining Tor to Cats Tor ridge and Hop Moor) are a designated Site of Special Scientific Interest (SSSI). Heather is the main plant but the heathland is habitat for a variety of native grasses, rushes, sedges and shrubs including bilberry, crowberry, cowberry and cross-leaved heath. Hare’s-tail cottongrass and sphagnum moss are common along The Tors ridge. The area is important for upland breeding birds including a large population of golden plover, as well as red grouse, curlew, lapwing, whinchat, snipe, twite, ring ouzel and merlin.

On 30 September 1943 two Republic P-47D Thunderbolt planes crashed on Cats Tor. Both pilots were killed. The USAAF aircraft were from the 2906th Observation Group. The planes were on a training flight from RAF Atcham. Both aircraft flew straight into the hillside in cloud in the mid-afternoon.

Cats Tor is a popular location for paragliding, used by the Derbyshire Soaring Club and the Peak Soaring Association.

Oldgate Nick, on the northern slope of Cats Tor, is a gritstone buttress with 15 graded rock climbing routes.

== See also ==
- List of hills in the Peak District
- List of Sites of Special Scientific Interest in Cheshire
- List of Sites of Special Scientific Interest in Derbyshire
