= Hawks Low =

Hill in Derbyshire, England

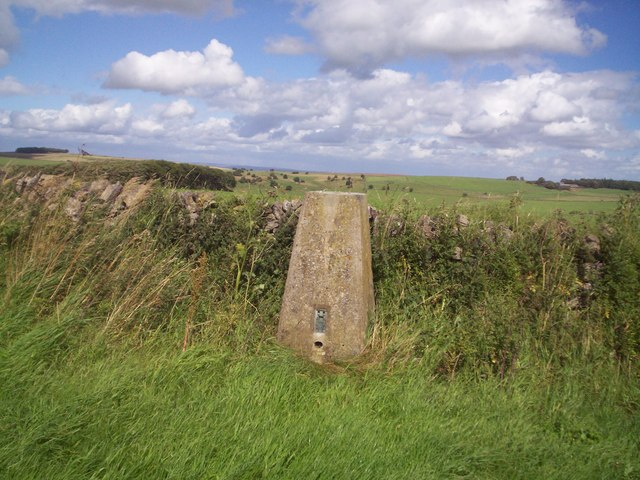
- The triangulation pillar at the summit

Highest point
- Elevation: 382 m (1,253 ft)
- Prominence: 35 metres (115 ft)
- Coordinates: 53°06′37″N 1°44′52″W

Geography
- Location within Derbyshire
- Location: Near Parwich, Derbyshire
- OS grid: SK 16972 57027

Hawks Low is a geographical feature, a hill about 1.5 miles (2.4 km) north-west of the village of Parwich, and about 6 miles (10 km) north of Ashbourne, in Derbyshire, England. It is in the White Peak, an area of carboniferous limestone in the Peak District. The Tissington Trail is nearby.

Its elevation is 382 metres (1,253 ft), and its prominence is 35 metres (115 ft). There is a triangulation pillar at the summit.

To the south, near the summit, is a Bronze Age bowl barrow. It measures 25 by 23 metres (82 by 75 ft) and is about 2 metres (6 ft 7 in) high. There is a rock-cut ditch, width about 5 metres (16 ft). Thomas Bateman excavated part of the barrow in 1843; human and animal bones were found, also potsherds and flint objects.

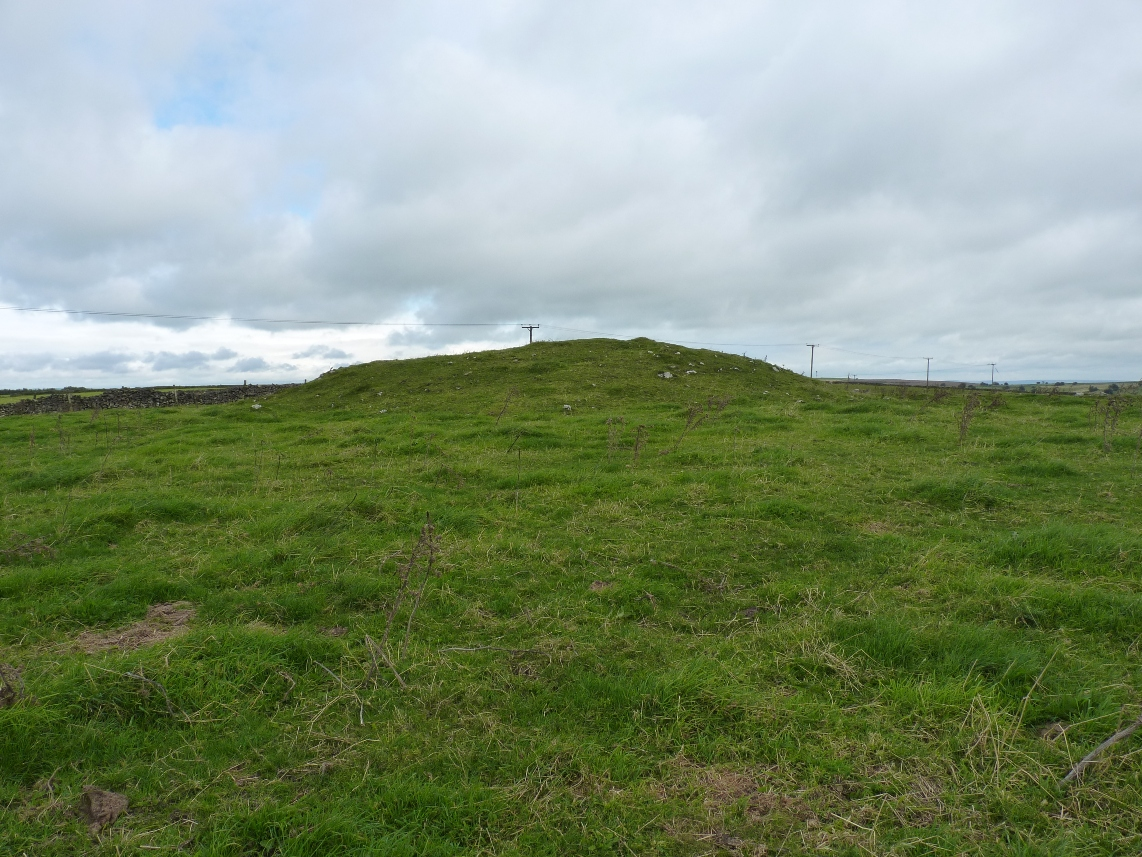
The bowl barrow near the summit
