= Wardlow Hay Cop =

Hill in Derbyshire, England

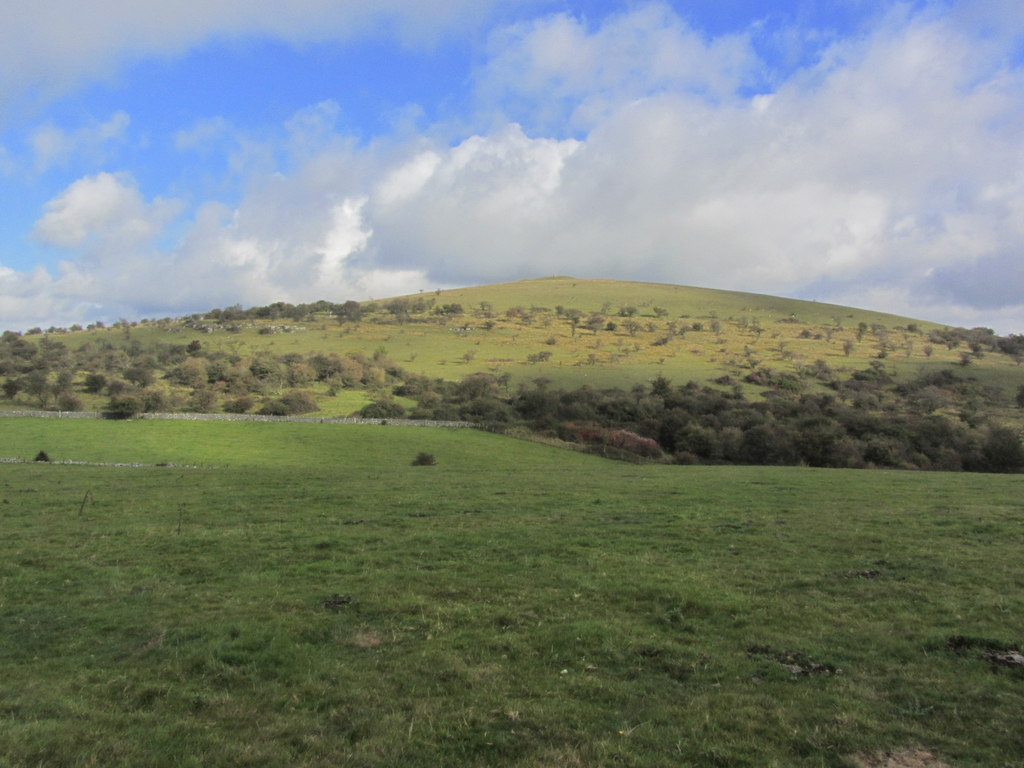
- Looking NNE towards Wardlow Hay Cop

Highest point
- Elevation: 370 m (1,210 ft)
- Prominence: 53 metres (174 ft)
- Coordinates: 53°15′45″N 1°44′02″W

Geography
- Location within Derbyshire
- Location: Near Wardlow, Derbyshire
- OS grid: SK 17851 73974

Wardlow Hay Cop is a geographical feature, a knoll about 7 miles (11 km) east of Buxton and about 4 miles (6 km) north-west of Bakewell, in Derbyshire, England. Cressbrook Dale is nearby to the west, and the village of Wardlow lies to the north-east. It is in the White Peak, an area of carboniferous limestone in the Peak District.

Its elevation is 370 metres (1,210 ft), and its prominence is 53 metres (174 ft).

There is a bowl barrow at the summit, on which a triangulation pillar stands. The barrow, a scheduled monument, probably dates from the Bronze Age; there is no recorded excavation. It measures 30 by 26.5 metres (98 by 87 ft), and is intact except for the north-west side. Where the hill drops away to the west towards Cressbrook Dale, its elevation is about 4 metres (13 ft), and is less elsewhere.

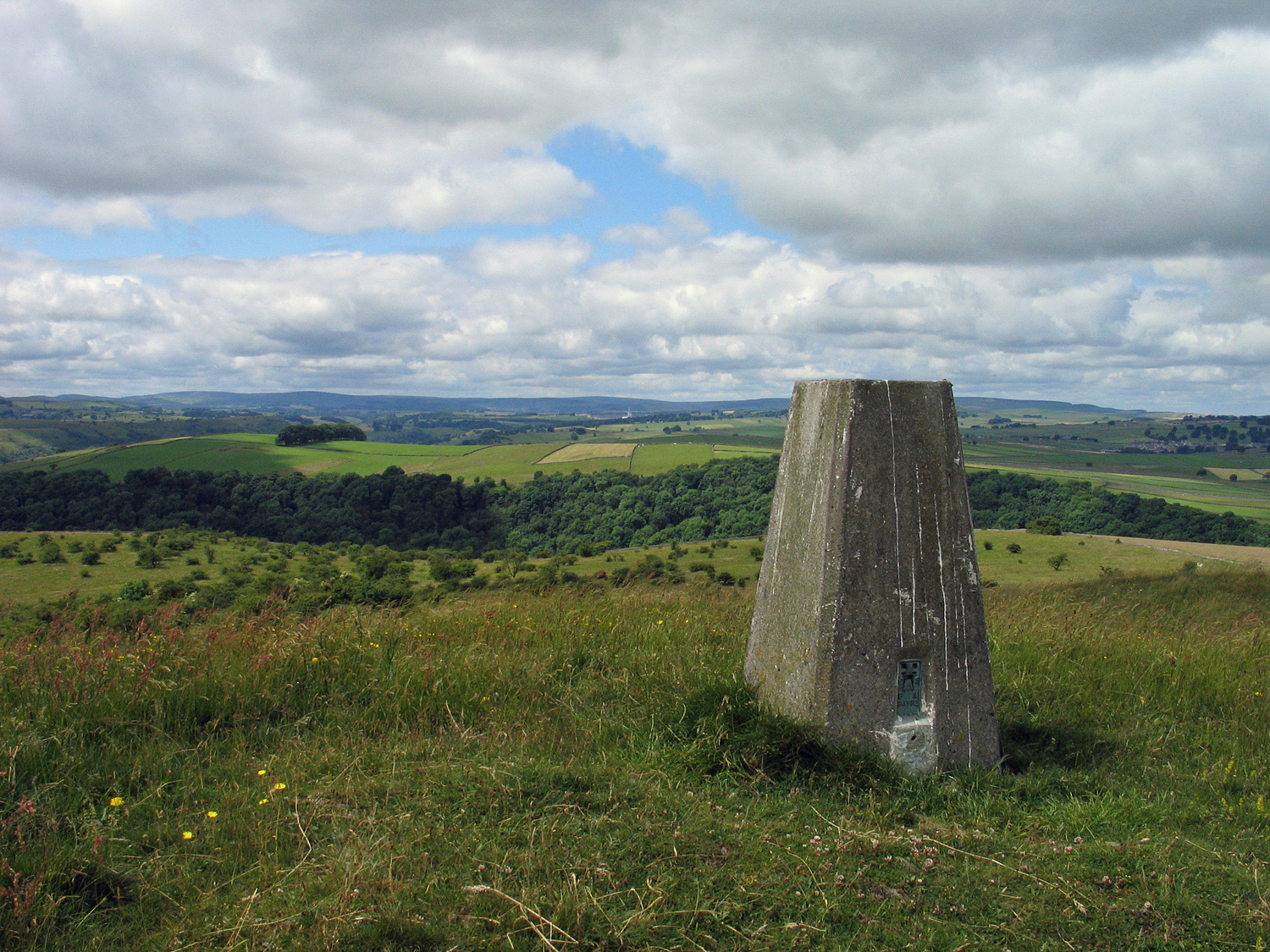
The triangulation pillar at the summit, looking west
