= Crook Hill =

Hill in Derbyshire, England

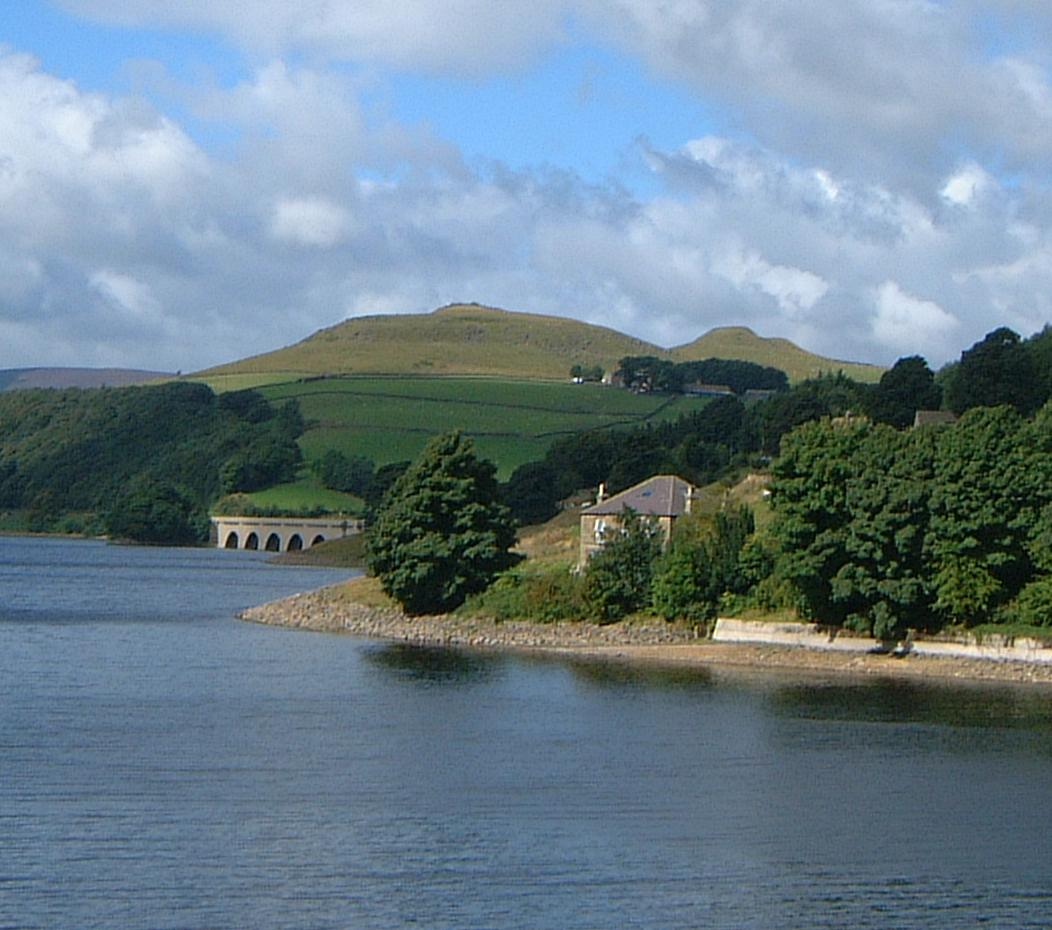
- The twin summits of Crook Hill above Ladybower Reservoir

Highest point
- Elevation: 382 m (1,253 ft)
- Prominence: 34 m
- Coordinates: 53.3782°N 1.7258°W

Geography
- Location: Peak District, England
- Parent range: Pennines
- OS grid: SK182871
- Topo map: OS Landranger 110

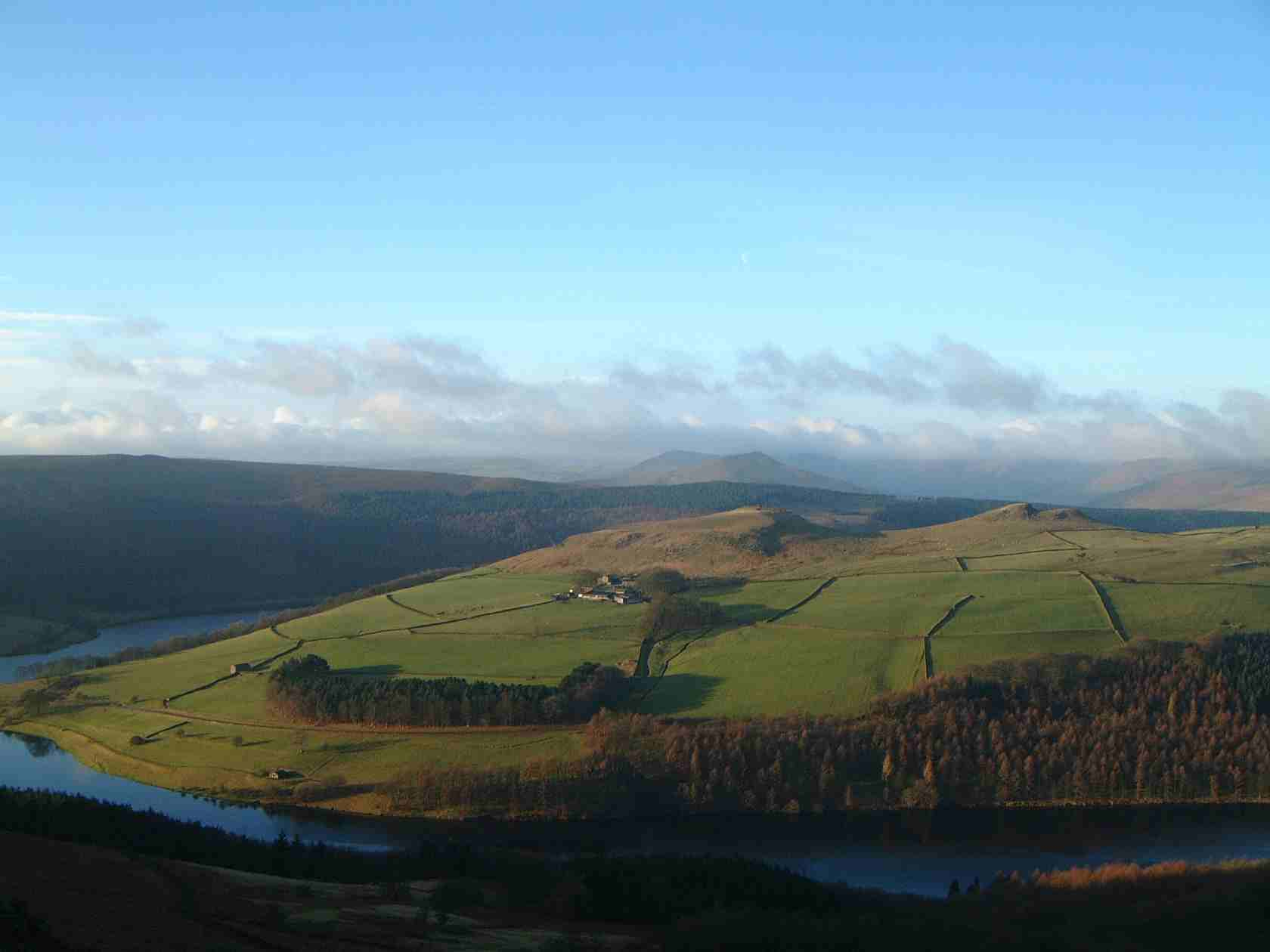
Crook Hill seen from Whinstone Lee Tor on Derwent Edge, Lose Hill and Mam Tor are in the distance.

Crook Hill is a small hill in the Peak District National Park in the English county of Derbyshire, 5 kilometres (3.1 mi) north east of Castleton.

== Overview ==
The hill is situated above the A57 Snake Pass road between Sheffield and Manchester as it passes Ladybower Reservoir. Crook Hill is regarded as an outlier of Kinder Scout although the two are separated by the long western arm of Ladybower Reservoir. The hill has twin summits, the highest of which reaches a modest height of 382 metres (1,253 ft) while the secondary top (sometimes referred to as Ladycrook Hill, although this name does not appear on Ordnance Survey maps) attains an altitude of 374 metres (1,227 ft). The actual high point of the ridge is Bridge-end Pasture, at 391 metres (1,283 ft) above sea level, which is about 1 km north east.

Geologically, the hill consists of Kinder Scout Grit, a kind of sandstone. Both the hill's summits give excellent views of the surrounding countryside with Ladybower Reservoir, Derwent Edge and Win Hill being the main attractions. Between the two summits there is some evidence of an ancient megalithic standing stone circle. The circle originally consisted of five stones around a surviving mound of which only two are still upright. There are also scheduled cairns in the vicinity.

Crook Hill is one of the 95 Ethels hills of the Peak District, launched by the countryside charity CPRE in 2021.

== Ascents ==
Crook Hill is normally climbed from the Derwent valley road just as it leaves the A57: a bridleway leaves the small car park at grid reference SK190871 and climbs steeply and muddily up to Crookhill Farm, a working sheep farm owned by the National Trust which also offers accommodation to tourists. Once the farm is passed, a stile is climbed onto the open sheep pasture and it is then a straightforward walk to the two twin summits, which are on designated access land.
