= Wolfscote Hill =

Hill in the Derbyshire Peak District

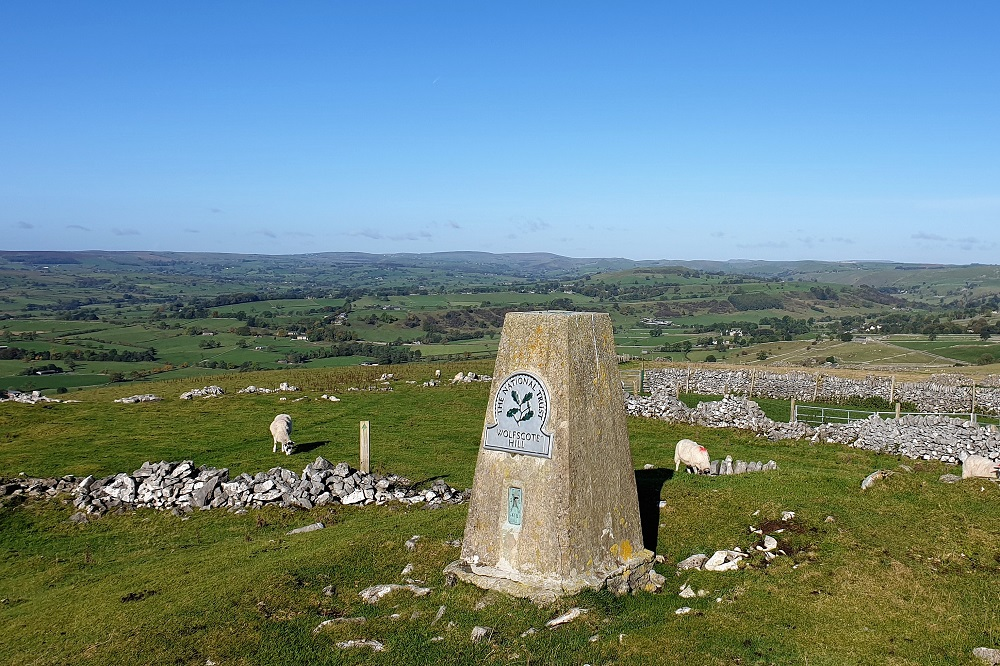
- Summit of Wolfscote Hill

Highest point
- Elevation: 388 metres (1,273 ft)
- Prominence: 102 metres (335 ft)
- Coordinates: 53.121944°N 1.79667°W

Geography
- Location: Hartington, Derbyshire, England
- OS grid: SK137583
- Topo map: OS Explorer OL24

Wolfscote Hill is a limestone hill near the village of Hartington in the Derbyshire Peak District. The summit is 388 metres (1,273 ft) above sea level.

The south side of the hill is access land, in the care of the National Trust. The land is part of the charity's White Peak estate. The 34 acres of land were bequeathed to the National Trust, with common rights, by Lady McDougall in 1939. The hill overlooks the River Dove running through Wolfscote Dale to the west, Biggin Dale to the east and Hartington to the north.

The Bronze Age burial mound at the summit is a protected Scheduled Monument. Wolfscote Hill bowl barrow features a cairn over 20 metres (66 ft) wide with a surrounding ditch. It was excavated by Thomas Bateman in 1843 and subsequently by Samuel Carrington in 1851. Their finds included a stone cist containing the skeletons of two children.

Wolfscote Hill is one of the 95 Ethels hills of the Peak District, launched by the countryside charity CPRE in 2021.
