= South Head (Peak District) =

Hill in the Derbyshire Peak District

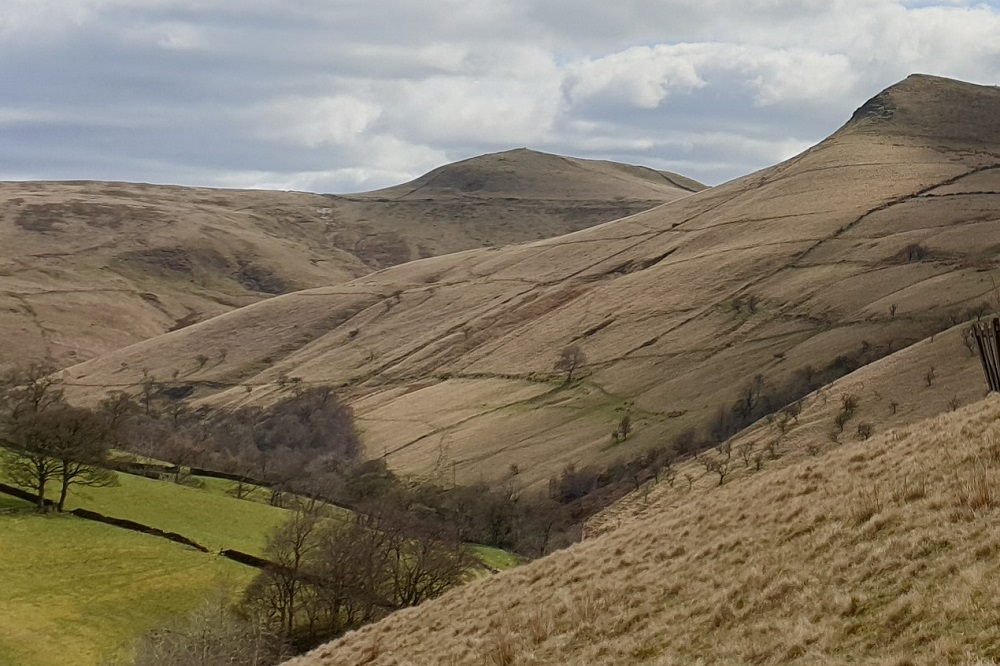
- View from north with Mount Famine on the right

Highest point
- Elevation: 494 metres (1,621 ft)
- Prominence: 38 metres (125 ft)
- Coordinates: 53°21′28″N 1°54′35″W

Geography
- Location: Near Hayfield, Derbyshire, Derbyshire, England
- OS grid: SK061846
- Topo map: OS Explorer OL1

South Head is a gritstone hill between the villages of Hayfield and Chinley in the Derbyshire Peak District. The summit is 494 metres (1,621 ft) above sea level. It lies at the south of the head of the River Sett.

The hilltop area was acquired by the National Trust in the 1980s and is designated as access land for the public. South Head farmstead was recorded in the 1640 plans of the waste and commons of Hayfield.

The Pennine Bridleway runs along the north and east sides of South Head. Since 2005, there has been an annual fell race each May from Hayfield around Mount Famine and South Head.

South Head is one of the 95 Ethels hills of the Peak District, launched by the countryside charity CPRE in 2021.
