= Mill Hill (Derbyshire) =

Hill in Derbyshire, England

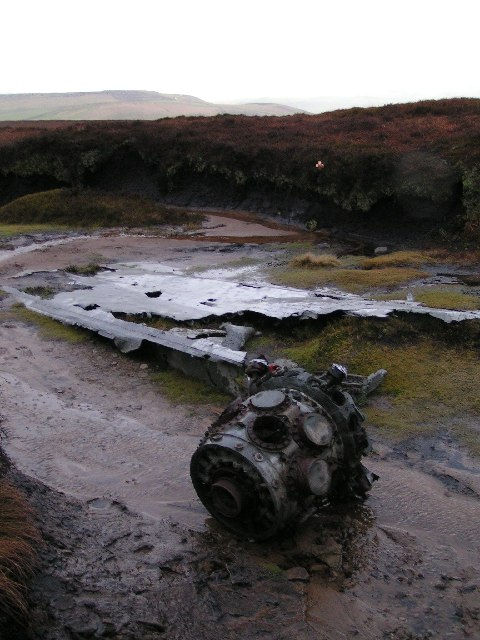
- Wreckage of the Liberator bomber on Mill Hill

Highest point
- Elevation: 1,785 ft (544 m)
- Prominence: 105 feet (32 m)
- Parent peak: Kinder Scout
- Listing: TuMP
- Coordinates: 53.4103°N 1.9095°W

Geography
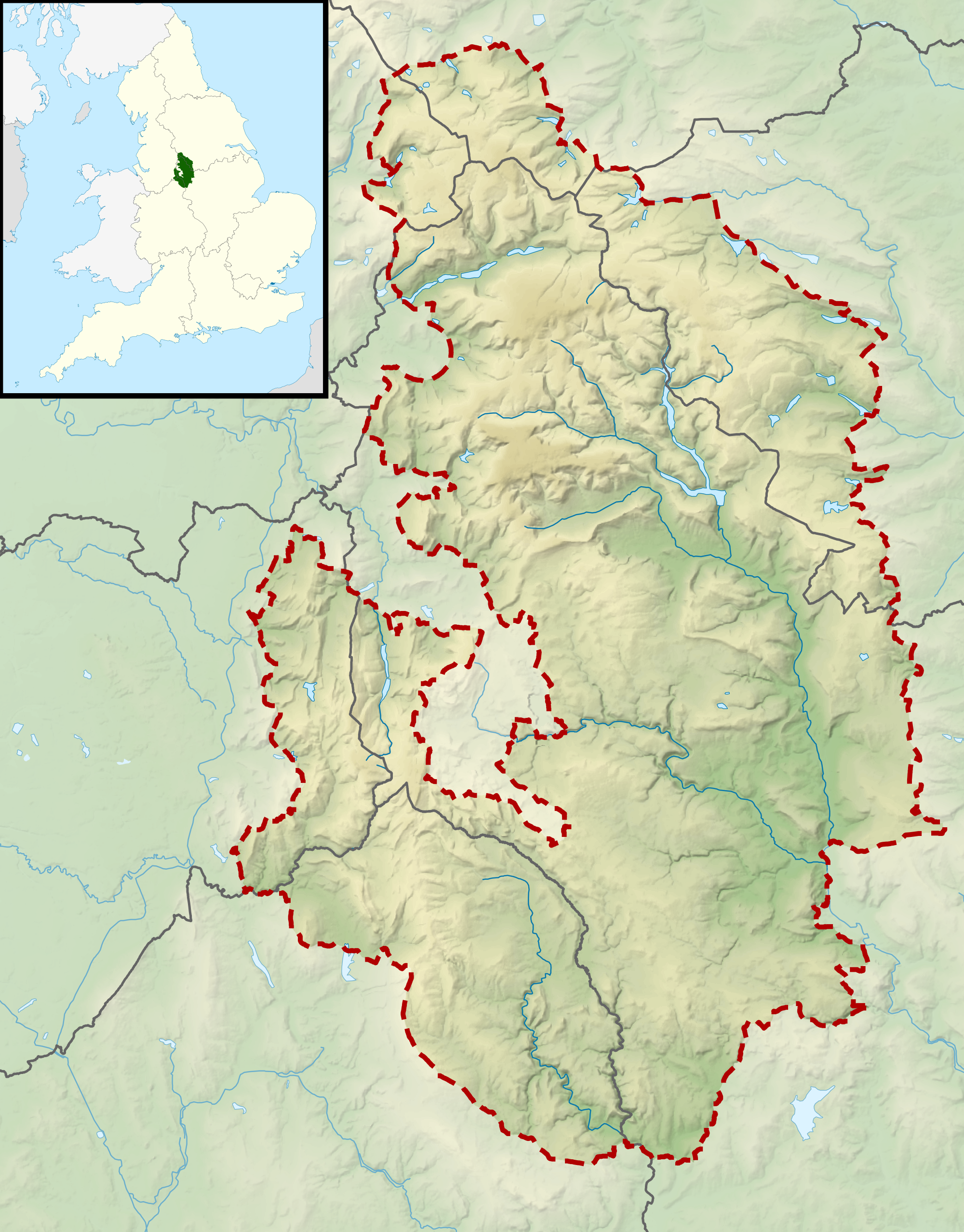
- Location within the Peak District Location within Derbyshire
- Location: Derbyshire, England, UK
- Parent range: Peak District
- OS grid: SK061904
- Topo map: OS Landranger 110; OL1W

Mill Hill is an open, flat-topped hill, 1,785 feet (544 m) above sea level, in the Peak District in the county of Derbyshire in England.

== Location ==
Mill Hill is 2.5 miles (4 km) southeast of the town of Glossop in the hills of Derbyshire's Peak District and a similar distance northwest of the Peak's highest point on Kinder Scout.

== Description ==
Mill Hill is a bare, domed summit surrounded by peat moorland that lies on the route of the Pennine Way about 2.5 miles (4 km) northwest of the highest point in the Peak District, Kinder Scout. There is a cairn and marker pole at the summit. The summit area has been so eroded by visitors that the highest point is now to the NE.

== Aircraft crash site ==
On 11 October 1944, a Liberator of the US 310th Ferry Squadron, 27th Air Transport Group, crashed at Mill Hill. The aircraft was being moved from RAF Burtonwood to RAF Hardwick. After having problems at take-off, the aircraft climbed to 2,800 feet. After experiencing turbulence, the aircraft flew into the ground in low cloud despite a warning from the navigator. The two crewmen, 2nd Lt Creighton R Houpt and SSgt Jerome M Najvar, survived the crash.
