= Aleck Low =

Hill in Derbyshire, England

- Aleck Low from the south-east

Highest point
- Elevation: 398 m (1,306 ft)
- Prominence: 59 metres (194 ft)
- Coordinates: 53°07′56″N 1°44′29″W

Geography
- Location within Derbyshire
- Location: Near Hartington, Derbyshire
- OS grid: SK 17399 59466

Aleck Low is a geographical feature, a hill about 1 mile (1.6 km) east of Biggin and about 2.5 miles (4 km) east of Hartington, in Derbyshire, England. It is in the White Peak, an area of carboniferous limestone in the Peak District. It is a short distance east of the High Peak Trail.

== Description ==
Its elevation is 398 metres (1,306 ft), and its prominence is 59 metres (194 ft). There is a triangulation pillar at the summit.

=== Bowl barrow ===
There is a prehistoric bowl barrow, a scheduled monument, at the summit, measuring 17 by 14.5 metres (56 by 48 ft) and about 1 metre (3 ft 3 in) high. The triangulation pillar is on its eastern side.

Thomas Bateman excavated part of it in 1843, and there was excavation by Llewellynn Jewitt in the 1860s. The top, and part of its north side, show some damage by excavations. Finds included a burial of a crouched human at the centre, and a cremation next to it. There were also two other skeletons, fragments of pottery and flint tools.

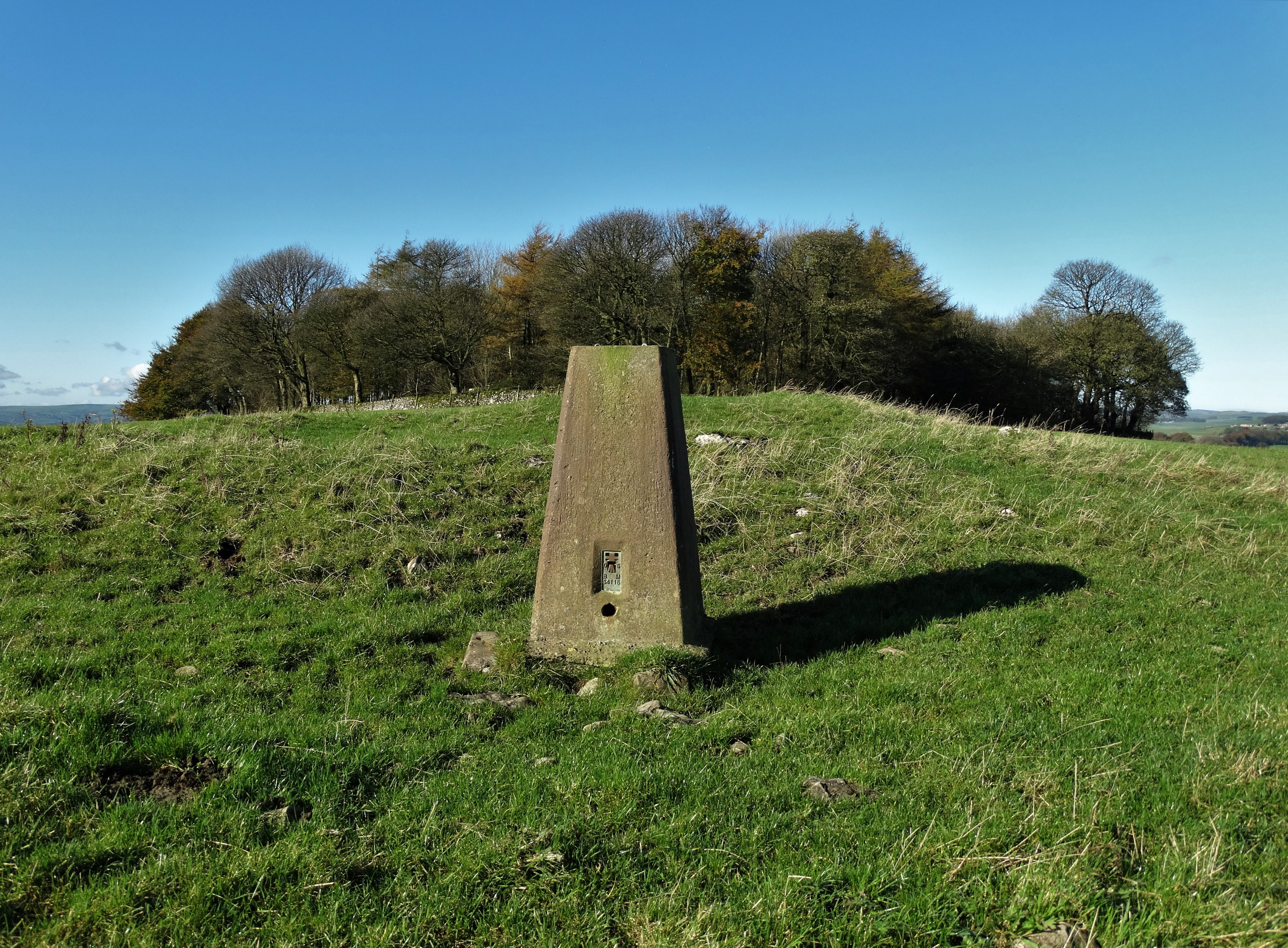
The triangulation pillar at the summit, in front of the bowl barrow
