= Minninglow =

Archaeological site in Derbyshire, England

- Minning Low
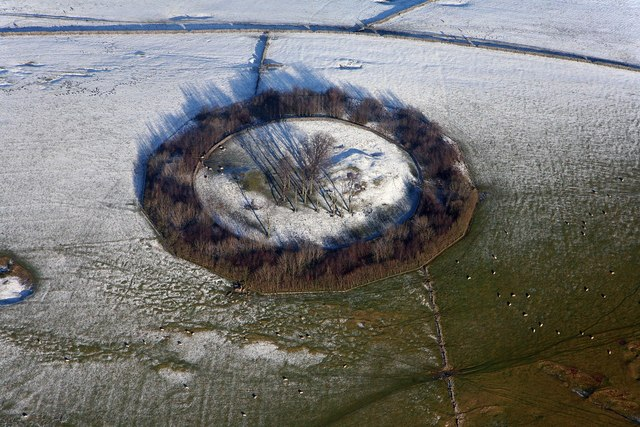
- Aerial view of the summit in 2009

Highest point
- Elevation: 372 m (1,220 ft)
- Coordinates: 53°06′45″N 1°41′20″W

Geography
- Location within Derbyshire
- Location: Derbyshire
- Parent range: Peak District
- OS grid: SK209573

Minninglow (or Minning Low) is a hill in the Peak District National Park in Derbyshire, located within the White Peak area at grid reference SK209573. Within the clump of trees crowning the hill are a Neolithic chambered tomb and two Bronze Age bowl barrows.

The chambered tomb (Derbyshire's largest) and barrows are a Scheduled Monument. The chambered tomb comprises an oval cairn of 45 by 38 metres (148 by 125 ft) surviving to a height of 2.4 metres (7 ft 10 in) and containing two complete chambers made of limestone slabs, and at least three other incomplete chambers. The tomb was excavated by Thomas Bateman in 1843 and 1851 and was described by Nikolaus Pevsner as "one of the most impressive of Derbyshire's surviving prehistoric burials". The barrow is considered to be a multi-period site, the oldest chamber dating from the Early Neolithic period but with other finds indicating use in the Late Neolithic or early Bronze Age, and also the Roman period. The two bowl barrows, also excavated by Bateman, date from the Bronze Age and also show signs of Roman disturbance.

Although it is within 200 metres (660 ft) of the High Peak Trail between Parwich and Longcliffe, there is no public right of way to the site. Since 31 January 2007, however, concessionary access has been granted by the landowner, allowing the public to walk to and explore the site. The concessionary path from the High Peak Trail is signposted with a wooden sign similar to a public footpath sign and there are wooden markers on the route to the barrow.

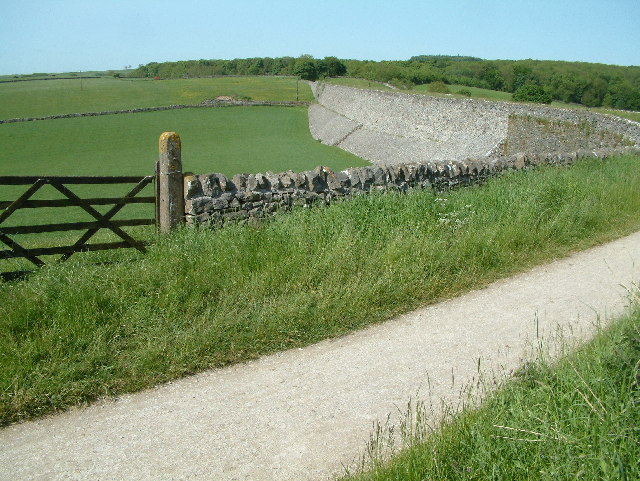
Minninglow Embankment on the High Peak Trail, formerly the Cromford and High Peak Railway

About one kilometre northwest of Minninglow hill is the massive Minninglow Embankment on the former Cromford and High Peak Railway, the trackbed of which now forms the High Peak Trail. This Grade-II-listed structure, constructed from local limestone and earth in the 1820s, is a pre-Victorian example of civil engineering on the grand scale. There is access from the car park and picnic site about 200 metres (660 ft) further along the High Peak Trail at grid reference SK194581.
