= Featherbed Top =

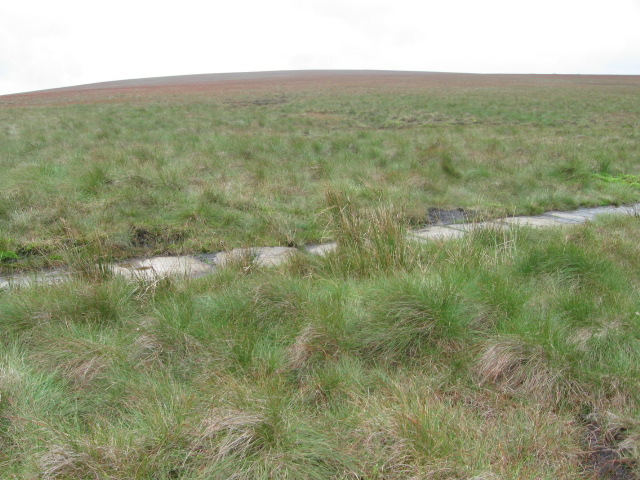
- Featherbed Top seen from Featherbed Moss

Highest point
- Elevation: 544 m (1,785 ft)
- Prominence: 32 m
- Parent peak: Kinder Scout
- Listing: Dewey, TuMP
- Coordinates: 53.4251°N 1.8648°W

Geography
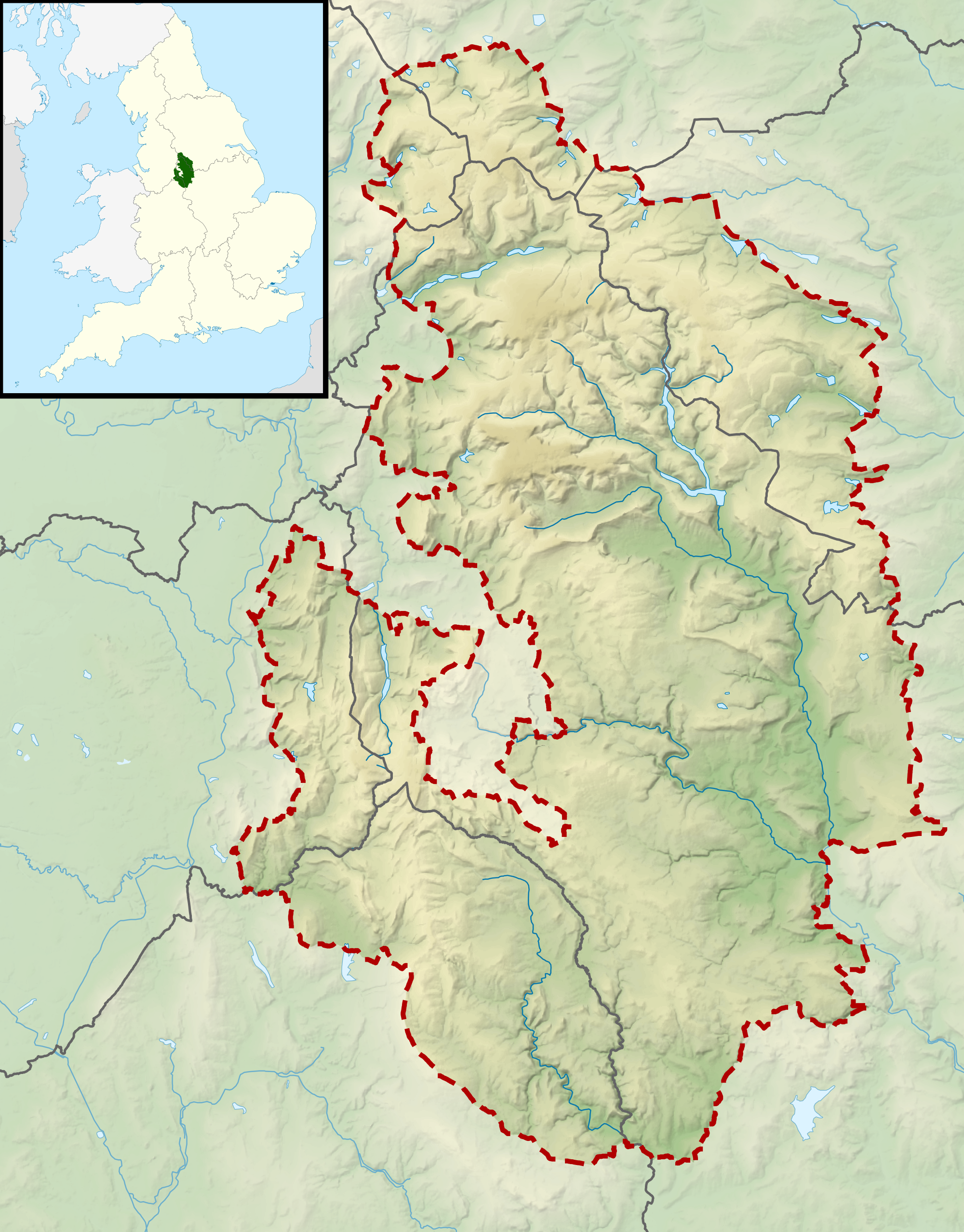
- Location within the Peak District Location within Derbyshire
- Location: Derbyshire, England, UK
- Parent range: Peak District
- OS grid: SK090920
- Topo map: OS Landranger 110; OL1W

Featherbed Top is an open, flat-topped hill, 544 metres (1,785 ft) high, in the Peak District in the county of Derbyshire in England.

== Description ==
Featherbed Top is a bare, domed summit covered by peat moorland. It rises about 900 metres (3,000 ft) south of where the Pennine Way crosses Snake Pass and ESE of the town of Glossop. It is one of the highest hills in the Peak District. The surrounding moorland is known as Featherbed Moss, but this should not be confused with the hill of the same name about 10 kilometres (6.2 mi) further north.
