= Featherbed Moss =

Hill in Derbyshire, England

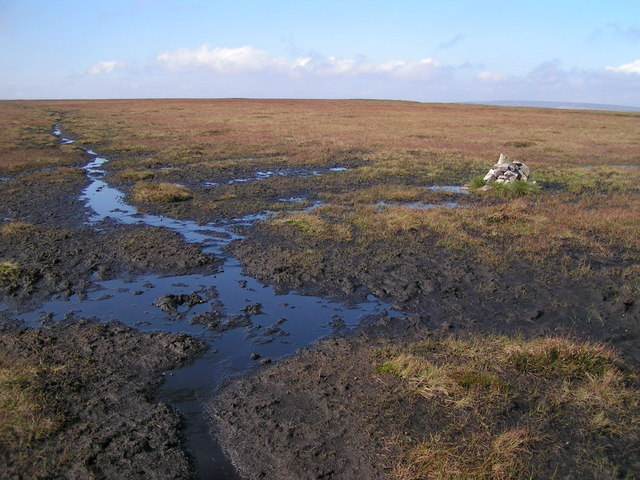
- Cairn on Featherbed Moss at the track junction to Lady Cross

Highest point
- Elevation: 541 m (1,775 ft)
- Prominence: 10 m
- Parent peak: Black Hill
- Listing: none
- Coordinates: 53.5070°N 1.9314°W

Geography
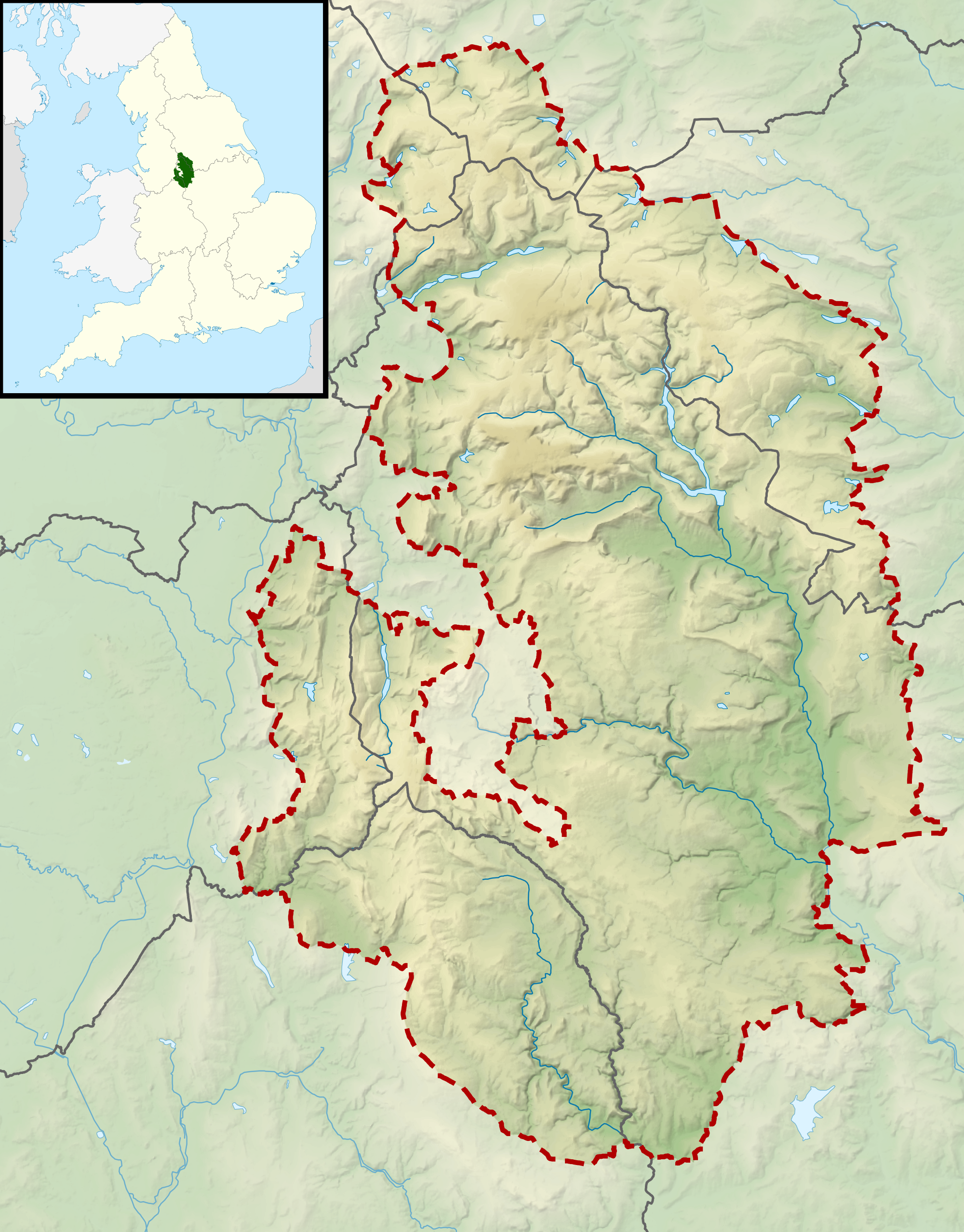
- Location within the Peak District Location within Derbyshire
- Location: Derbyshire, England
- Parent range: Peak District
- OS grid: SE046011
- Topo map: OS Landranger 110; OL1W

Featherbed Moss is a flat-topped hill, 541 metres (1,775 ft) high, in the Peak District in the county of Derbyshire in England. It is sometimes mistakenly thought to be a joint county top.

== Description ==
Featherbed Moss is a treeless, domed summit covered by moist peaty moorland vegetation. It rises south of Chew Reservoir. To the south the land falls increasingly steeply into the Torside Reservoir and, to the east into the ravine of the Crowden Great Brook through which the Pennine Way runs from north to south.
