= Shining Tor =

Highest point in Cheshire, England

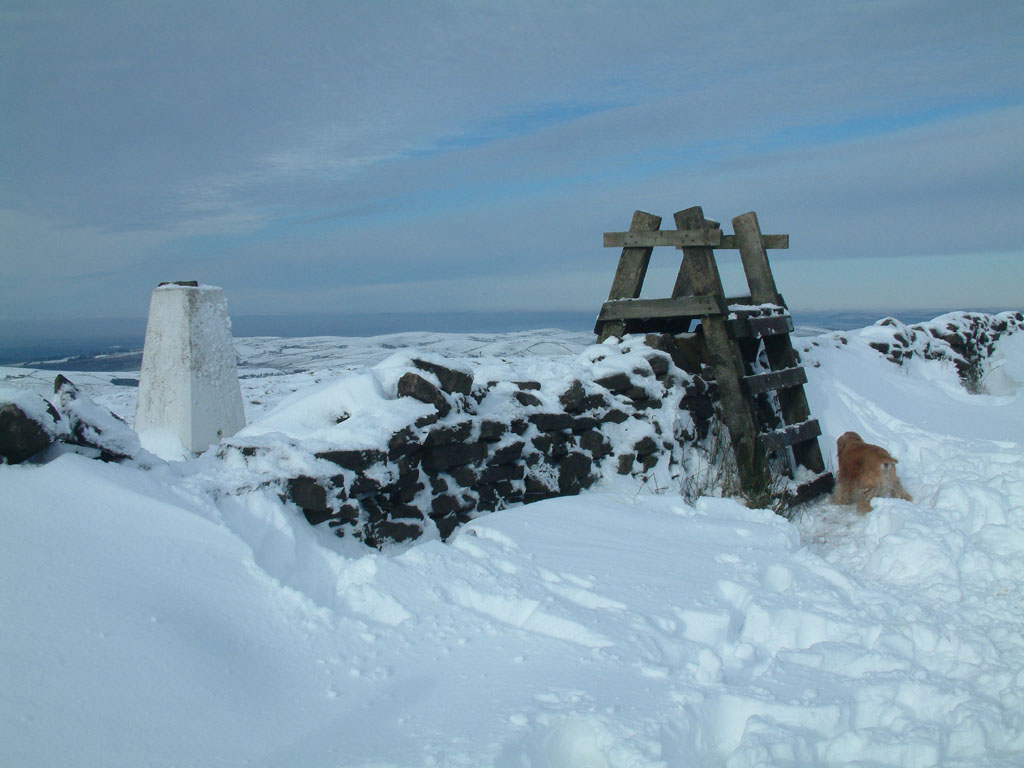
- The trig point and former ladder stile at the summit of Shining Tor.

Highest point
- Elevation: 559 m (1,834 ft)
- Prominence: 236 m
- Parent peak: Kinder Scout
- Listing: Marilyn, County Top, Dewey
- Coordinates: 53°15′38″N 2°00′34″W

Geography
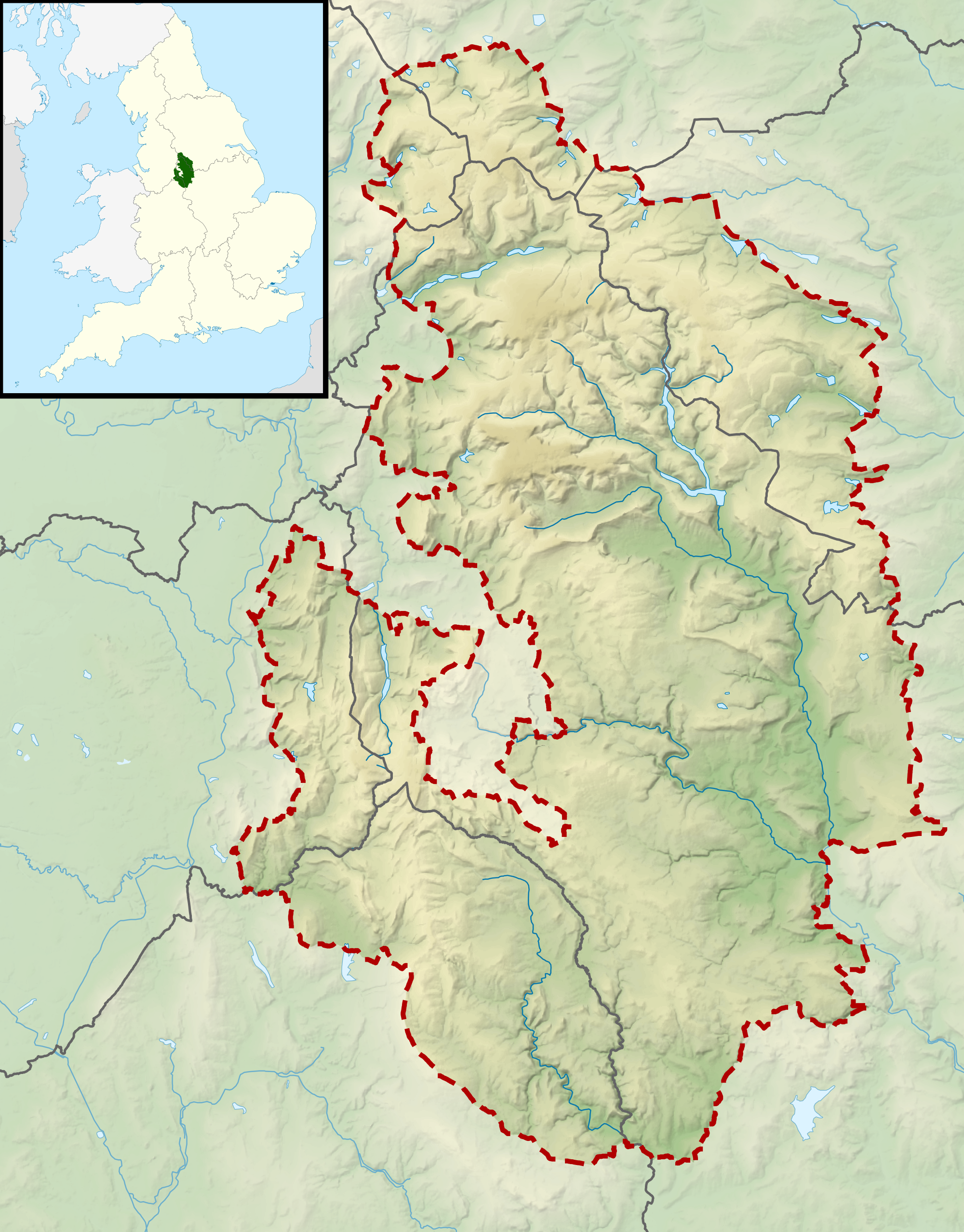
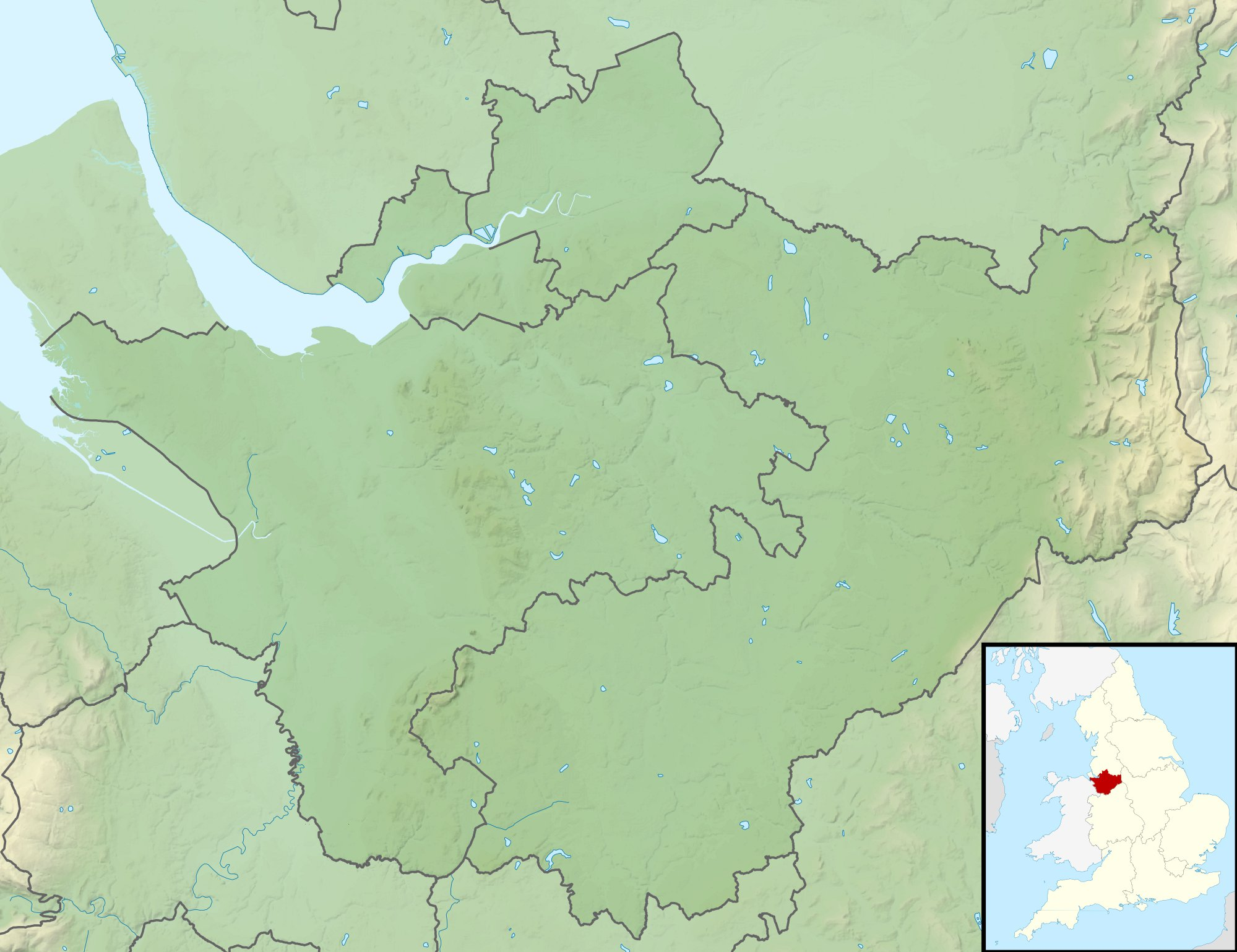
- Location within the Peak District Location within Cheshire
- Location: Cheshire, England
- Parent range: Peak District
- OS grid: SJ994737
- Topo map: OS Landranger 118

Shining Tor is the highest hill in Cheshire, England. The summit has an elevation of 559 m (1,834 ft) above sea level. It is in the Peak District, between the towns of Macclesfield in Cheshire and Buxton in Derbyshire, and is on the administrative boundary between Derbyshire and Cheshire East. The hill is at the south end of a north-south moorland ridge, which also includes Cats Tor, 519 metres (1,703 ft) high. There is also another hill named Shining Tor, above Dovedale in Derbyshire, at grid reference SK145545.

== Ascent ==
The hill offers many walking routes to the top, perhaps most commonly from the Upper Goyt Valley by Errwood reservoir, perhaps combined with a walk along the ridge north from Shining Tor over Cats Tor. It can also be gained with less climbing from the Cat and Fiddle Inn.

== Views ==
As it is the highest point around (it is some 8 metres (26 ft) higher than the summit of Axe Edge Moor above Buxton), the views are pleasant, though the relatively flat uplands mean they are not extensive in all directions: the view to the southwest of the peak of Shutlingsloe above Wildboarclough is particularly notable, and in clear conditions Winter Hill near Bolton, the city of Manchester and much of the Cheshire Plain can be seen, including the radio telescopes at Jodrell Bank 20 kilometres (12 mi) to the west. In very clear but not unusual conditions North Wales and even Snowdonia can be seen. The hill is used by amateur radio operators for Summits On The Air activations (G/SP-004, 2 points).

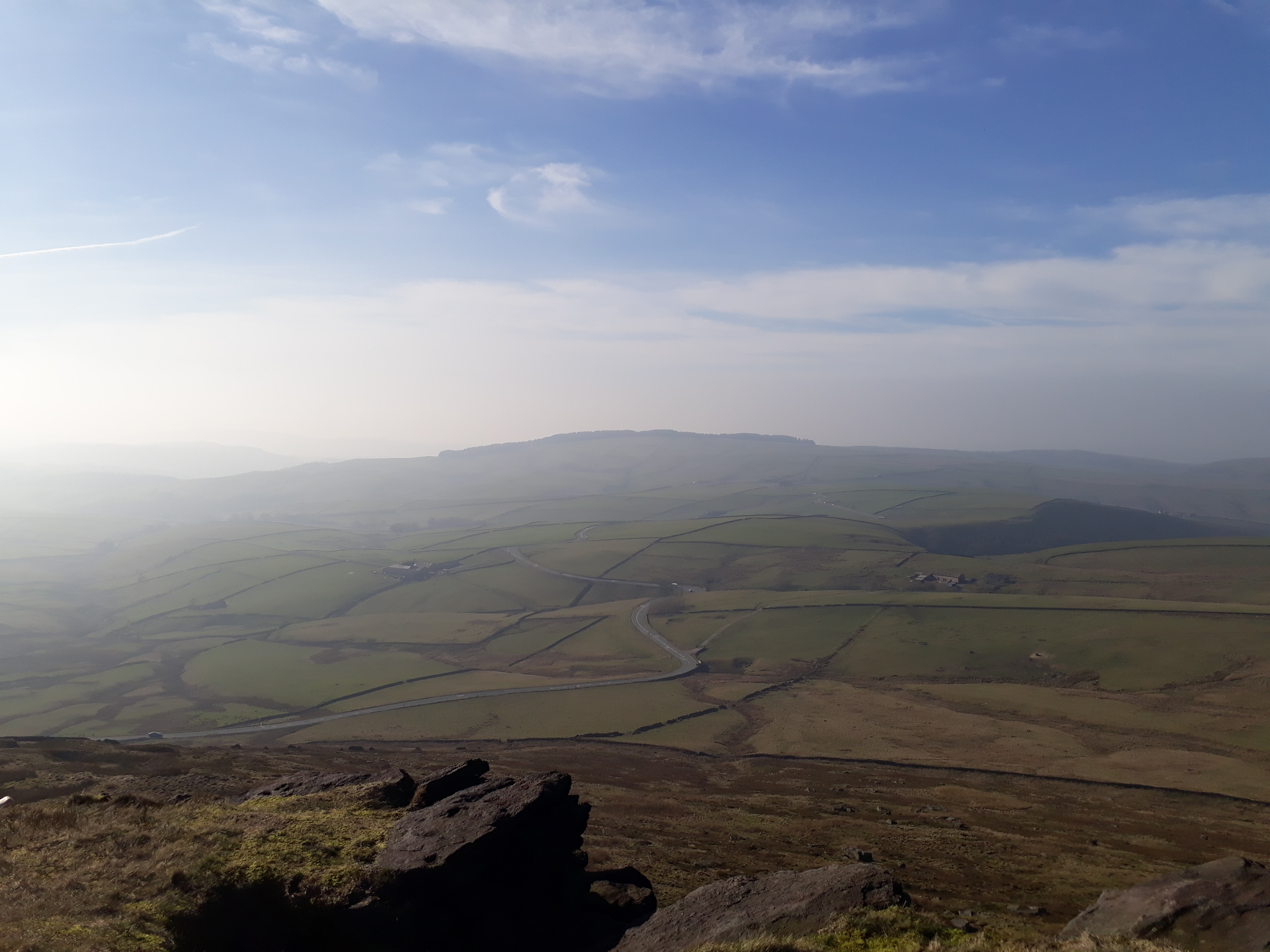
Cat and Fiddle road from Shining Tor.

== Geology ==
The north–south ridge of Shining Tor including the summit itself is formed from the Chatsworth Grit, a thick sandstone of Namurian age which occurs widely across the Peak District. The beds dip moderately steeply to the east into a north–south-aligned syncline known as the Goyt Trough. Shining Tor is thought to have stood above the ice sheet during the last ice age and so is free from glacial deposits. The eastern dipslope and shallower parts of its western flanks are covered by peat up to several metres deep.
