= Vale of Edale =

Valley in the Peak District of England

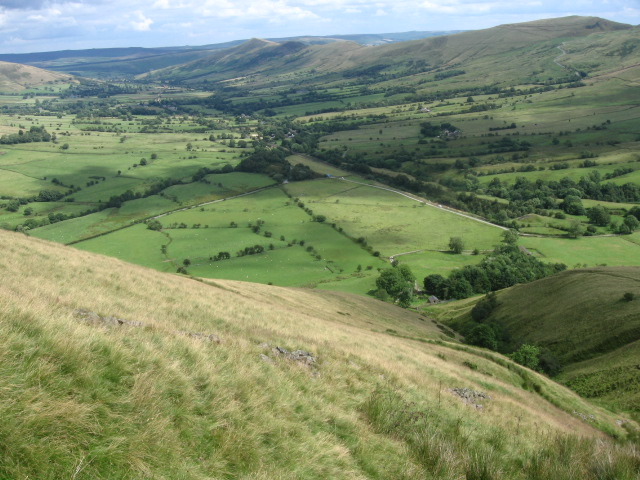
- Looking east from Horsehill Tor
- Length: c.7 kilometres (4 mi)
- Width: c.2 kilometres (1 mi)
- Depth: c.300 metres (984 ft)

Geography
- Location: Derbyshire, England
- Coordinates: 53.3688°N 1.8574°W
- Rivers: River Noe
- Interactive map of Vale of Edale

The Vale of Edale is the upper valley of the River Noe, in the Derbyshire Peak District of England. The village of Edale lies in the middle of the valley.

Edale Head, on the Kinder Scout plateau, is the source of the River Noe (a tributary to the River Derwent). The River Noe flows out of the foot of the Vale of Edale into Hope Valley, past the village of Hope and through Brough-on-Noe, where the Romans established Navio fort.

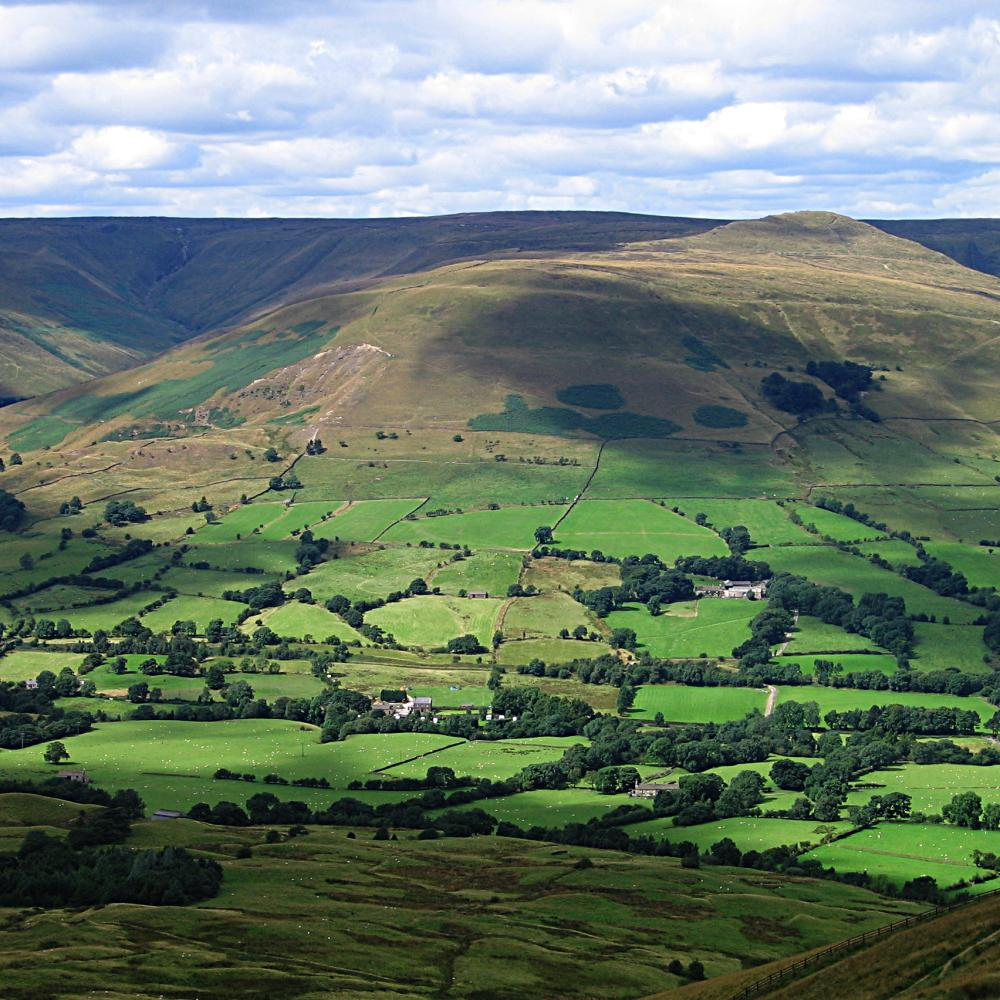
View from Mam Tor over the Vale of Edale to Kinder

On the north side of the valley is the Kinder moorland plateau. On the south side is the ridge of Rushup Edge and Great Ridge, over Mam Tor and Hollins Cross to Lose Hill. The other settlements in the valley are the hamlets of Upper Booth, Barber Booth and Nether Booth.

The Hope Valley railway line (Manchester to Sheffield) runs along the Vale of Edale. The train line, built by Midland Railway, and Edale railway station were opened in 1894. At the western end of the Vale of Edale the line heads through the 3.4 kilometres (2.1 miles) long Cowburn Tunnel at Dale Head, under the moorland hill of Brown Knoll.

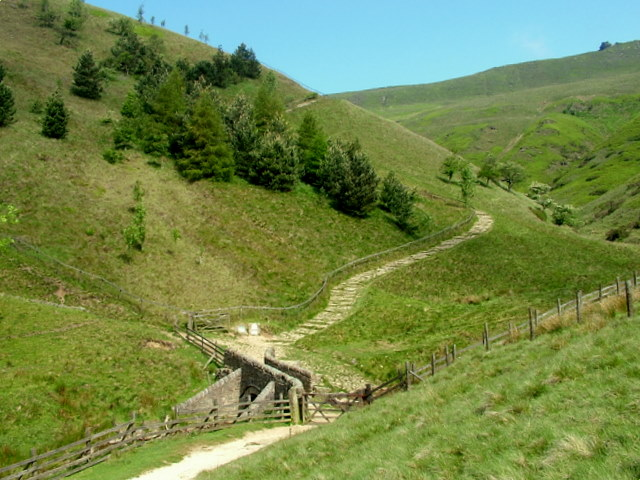
Packhorse bridge at the foot of Jacob's Ladder

Edale is the start of the Pennine Way long distance footpath, which runs from Derbyshire to Scotland. The trail heads west through Upper Booth and up Jacob's Ladder footpath to the Kinder plateau. At the foot of Jacob's ladder is a gritstone packhorse bridge, with a single span which crosses the River Noe. It is a designated Grade II structure. The bridge is on an important medieval packhorse route over the Pennine moorland between Hayfield and Edale. Salt and cheese from Cheshire and cotton from the Lancashire mills were transported to the east, while coal and lead were carried to the west. Doctor's Gate Roman road ran along the hillside at the eastern end of the valley.

The land along the banks of the River Noe between Barber Booth and Jacob's Ladder is protected as Edale SSSI (Site of Special Scientific Interest). The banks and riverbed contain important fossils from the rocks known as Edale Shales. There are kestrels, buzzards and curlews in the valley. The trees along the hillsides include birch, rowan and alder. Jacob's ladder footpath runs across land that is owned and managed by the National Trust. It is also part of the Kinder Scout SSSI, which was designated as a National Nature Reserve in 2009.
