= Rushup Edge =

Ridge in England

Coordinates: 53°20.8′N 1°49.8′W

Lord's Seat (Rushup Edge)
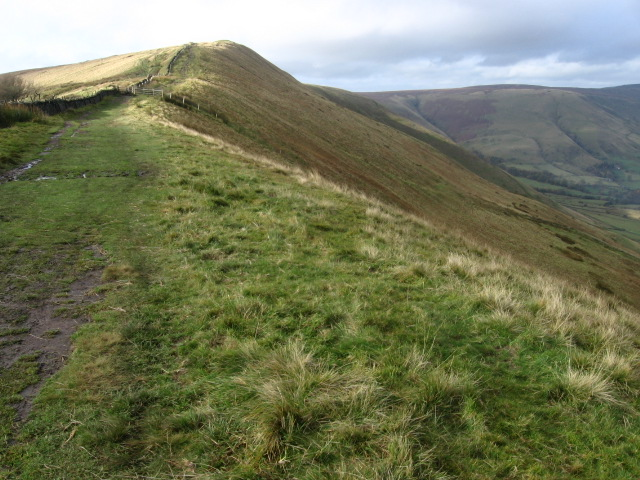
- Rushup Edge towards Lord's Seat

Highest point
- Elevation: 550 m (1,800 ft)
- Prominence: 62 m
- Parent peak: Kinder Scout
- Listing: Dewey, TuMP

Geography
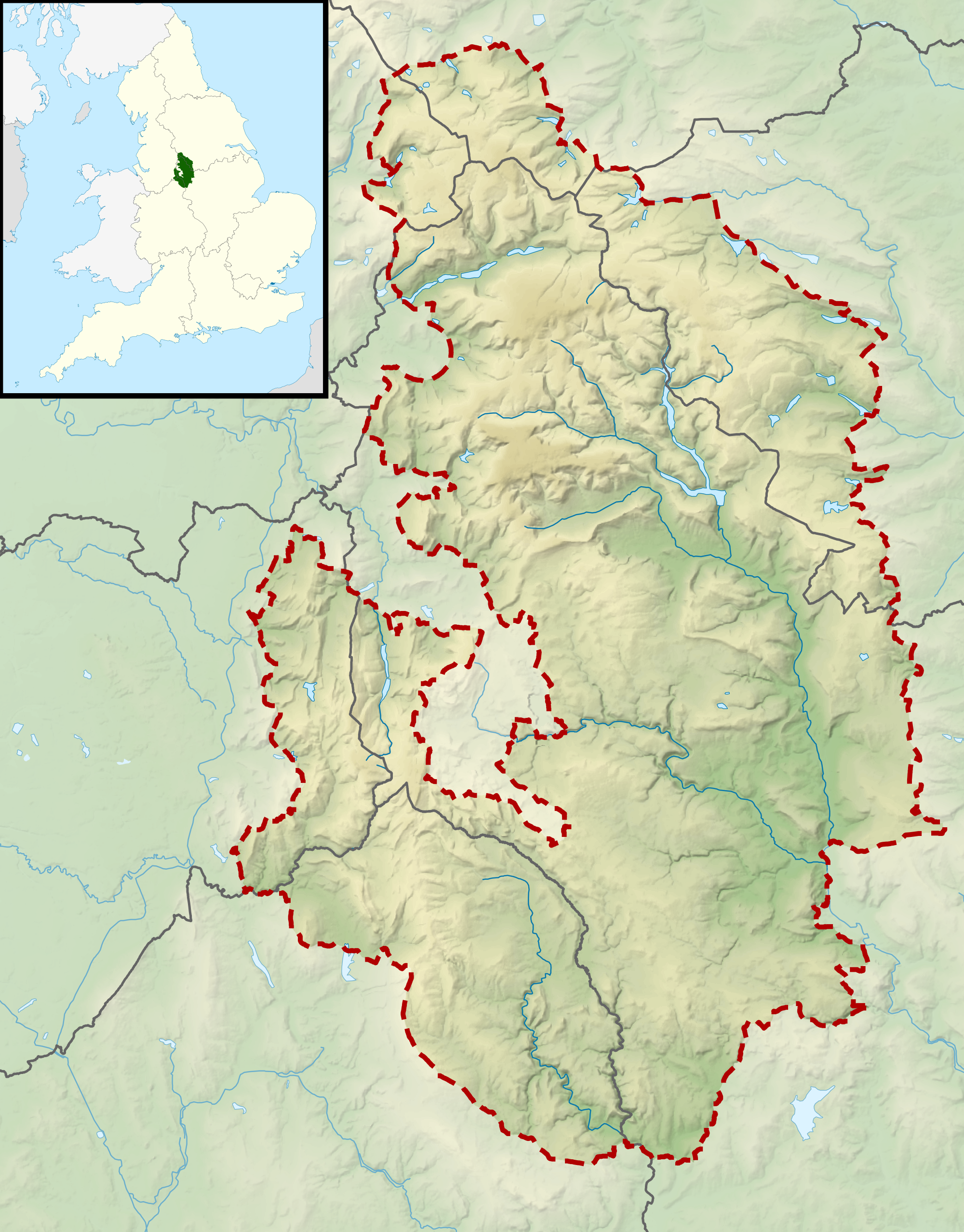
- Location within the Peak District Location within Derbyshire
- Location: Derbyshire, England
- Parent range: Peak District
- OS grid: SK111834
- Topo map: OS Landranger 110

Rushup Edge is a ridge in the Derbyshire Peak District of England. The ridge's highest point is Lord's Seat at 550 m (1,804 ft), while Mam Tor lies beyond its eastern end, at the western end of the Great Ridge.

Lord's Seat is the site of a round barrow.

== Geology ==
Rushup Edge is part of the ridge which extends east to Mam Tor, Hollins Cross, Back Tor and Lose Hill, separating the Edale and Hope valleys. The ridge is formed of Namurian (c320mya) age Mam Tor Beds (alternating sandstone and siltstone) and landslides on the north have formed colluvium.

== Protest ==
In October 2014, mountain bikers, walkers, horse riders, climbers and conservationists held a protest against Derbyshire County Council maintenance work on the byway that runs along Rushup Edge. They were upset at the insensitive nature of the work, the cost, the environmental impact and the apparent lack of consultation with them before works began. Derbyshire County Council halted the work to speak with protesters in December 2014.

== See also ==
- Rushop, also known as Rushup, a nearby village
