= Nicholas Cresswell =

British diarist (1750–1804)

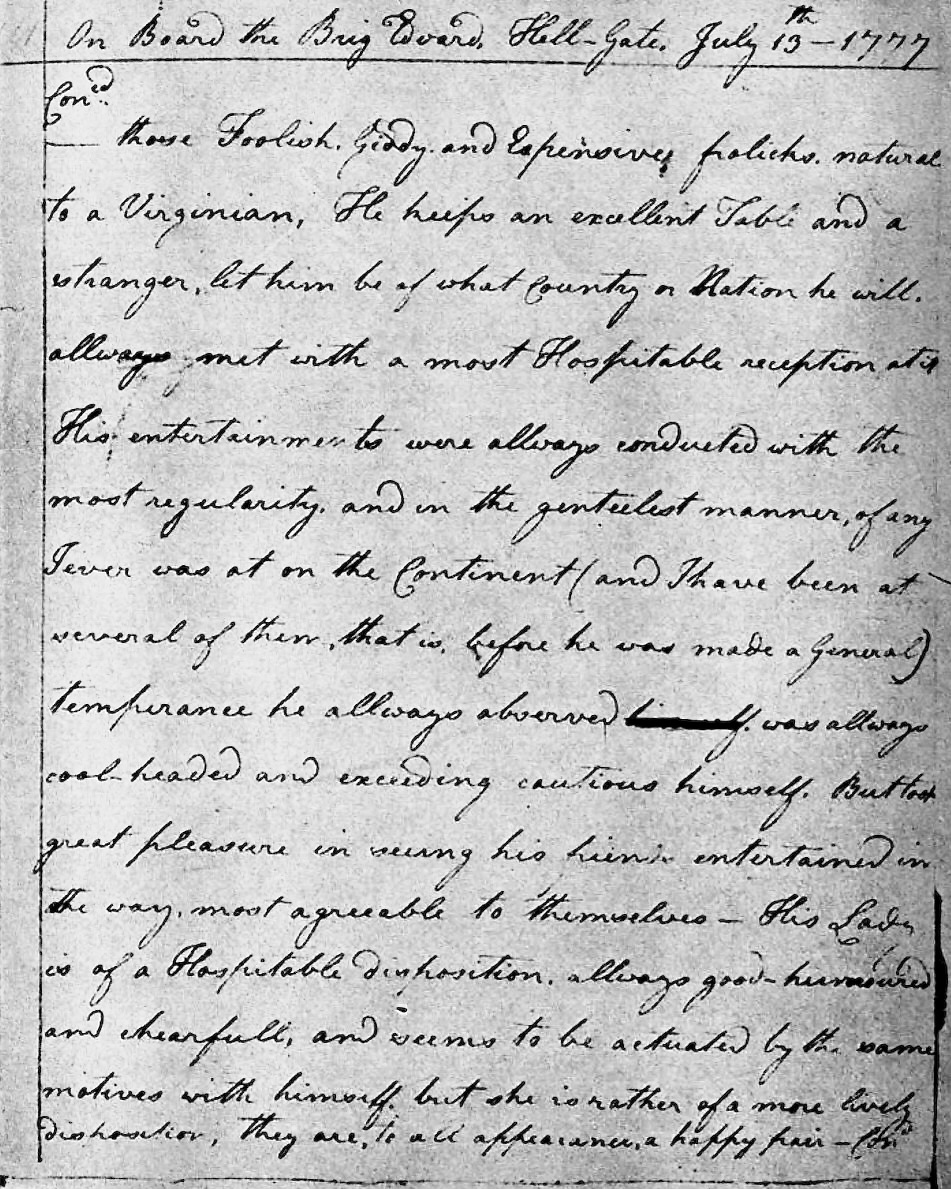
Nicholas Cresswell's diary page dated July 13, 1777

Nicholas Cresswell (5 January 1750 – 26 July 1804) was an English diarist and explorer, best known for his detailed journal documenting his travels to America during the years 1774 to 1777.

== Early life ==
Nicholas Cresswell was the eldest son of Thomas Cresswell, a landowner and prominent sheep farmer from Edale, a parish in the Peak District of Derbyshire, England. Edale was historically part of the Forest of High Peak, one of the largest forests in the country. Cresswell was born at Crowden-le-Booth, Edale, and was 24 years old when he traveled to America in 1774.

His mother, Elizabeth Cresswell, was the daughter and heiress of Richard Oliver of Smalldale in Bradwell, near Castleton, Derbyshire. Thomas Cresswell, his father, was a respected figure in the Peak District, known for his land ownership and agricultural activities. He also established a local school to educate children in the area, and it is believed that Nicholas received his early education there before attending Wakefield Grammar School.

The Cresswell family traced its origins to Cresswell in Northumberland, where they held land under the English Crown. Their historical role included maintaining Castle Cresswell and assisting in defending against Scottish invasions. A branch of the family later settled near Chapel-en-le-Frith in Derbyshire during the 14th century, where they held lands under the Crown until 1631. Ralph Cresswell of Malcoff, Chapel-en-le-Frith, sold the family’s property to the Ford family around 1631 and relocated.

== Leaving home ==
In early March 1774, Nicholas Cresswell documented his resolve to travel to America, specifically to Virginia, which he considered the most favorable colony. He acknowledged that his decision was driven not only by personal ambition but also by private reasons related to the well-being of his family. Cresswell hoped that his departure would contribute to the future peace and stability of those he held in high regard.

Cresswell viewed the voyage as an opportunity to assess whether America would be a suitable place for his long-term residence. If he found the country agreeable, he planned to return to England and seek financial support from his family to establish himself in the New World. If not, he believed the experience would help him be more personally settled in England. He also expressed hope that his journey would have positive implications for his family, though he recognised prospects for failure. Nicholas noted the strained relationship with his father, who had barely spoken to him since his return from Liverpool, where Nicholas had investigated finding passage to the Americas. This silence made it difficult for Cresswell to plan, as he was uncertain of the financial support his father would provide.

To gain his father’s approval, Cresswell enlisted the help of Mr. James Carrington, a trusted intermediary. On March 2, 1774, he approached Carrington, who reluctantly agreed to advocate on his behalf. Although Cresswell doubted Carrington’s persuasive abilities, he trusted his honesty and commitment to the cause. On March 3, 1774, Carrington successfully negotiated with Cresswell’s father, securing his reluctant consent for the voyage.

== Crossing the Atlantic ==
Nicholas Cresswell’s voyage to America began on April 9, 1774, aboard the Molly. Departing Liverpool, the ship initially enjoyed favorable winds but soon faced rough seas, damaging the fore top gallant yard on April 14. Cresswell struggled with severe seasickness, which he attempted to alleviate by drinking seawater on April 15, finding some relief despite its harsh effects.

The passengers included the Reverend John Baldwin and his brother Thomas, who traveled under false names, claiming to seek better health in Bermuda, and Captain Alexander Knox, a Scotsman bound for Maryland. The group partook in a maritime tradition by toasting their sweethearts with grog.

Cresswell noted the sailors’ curious behaviour: while they frequently used profanity, they prayed sincerely when they did so. On April 17, the parson aboard chose to read about scurvy instead of leading prayers, leaving the sailors to read from their prayer books. By April 18, Cresswell’s seasickness began to subside, and he reported feeling hungry, a sign of recovery. The Molly encountered several grampuses (large marine mammals) during its journey, which Cresswell described as impressive creatures capable of spouting water high into the air. The weather remained sultry and hazy, with light winds and a heavy swell from the north.

On May 14, after 27 days at sea, the ship finally sighted land near Cape Henry, Virginia. Cresswell noted the low, sandy coastline covered with pine trees. A pilot boarded the ship to guide them into Chesapeake Bay. That evening, a sudden storm with thunder, lightning, and heavy rain forced the crew to anchor in six fathoms of water. Following maritime tradition, the passengers provided the sailors with a bottle of rum to celebrate reaching land, leading to widespread drunkenness and rowdy behavior aboard the ship. The next day, May 15, the weather cleared, and Cresswell marveled at the view from the masthead: a flat, pine-covered landscape with numerous rivers flowing into the bay. He counted nineteen ships in the area, describing the scene as one of the finest prospects he had ever seen. The Molly anchored again that evening off Windmill Point. Unfavorable winds and the pilot’s inexperience delayed further progress. During this time, the captain received a letter revealing that the Baldwin brothers, fellow passengers, had fled England to escape debts.

== Arrival in Virginia ==
On May 17, 1774, after 38 days at sea, the Molly anchored near Urbanna, a small village on the Rappahannock River in Virginia. Cresswell, along with Captain Parry, Captain Knox, and the Baldwin brothers, went ashore. Urbanna, home to the local custom house and tobacco warehouses, was described as pleasantly situated on a creek. The Baldwin brothers stayed with a local merchant, while Cresswell and Knox lodged at an inn.

The next day, Cresswell explored the surrounding countryside, noting the sandy, seemingly barren land that nonetheless produced excellent garden crops, including green peas. On May 19, the Molly arrived, and Cresswell and Knox hired a boat to travel to Nanjemoy on the Potomac River, about 60 miles from Alexandria, Virginia. After loading their baggage at Deep Creek, they bid farewell to the Baldwins, who were departing Norfolk.

== Later life and death ==
After a failed attempt to receive a provincial commission from Lord Dunmore, Virginia's British governor, during the American Revolutionary War, Cresswell returned to Edale to resume farming. He died in Idridgehay in 1804.
