= Moors for the Future =

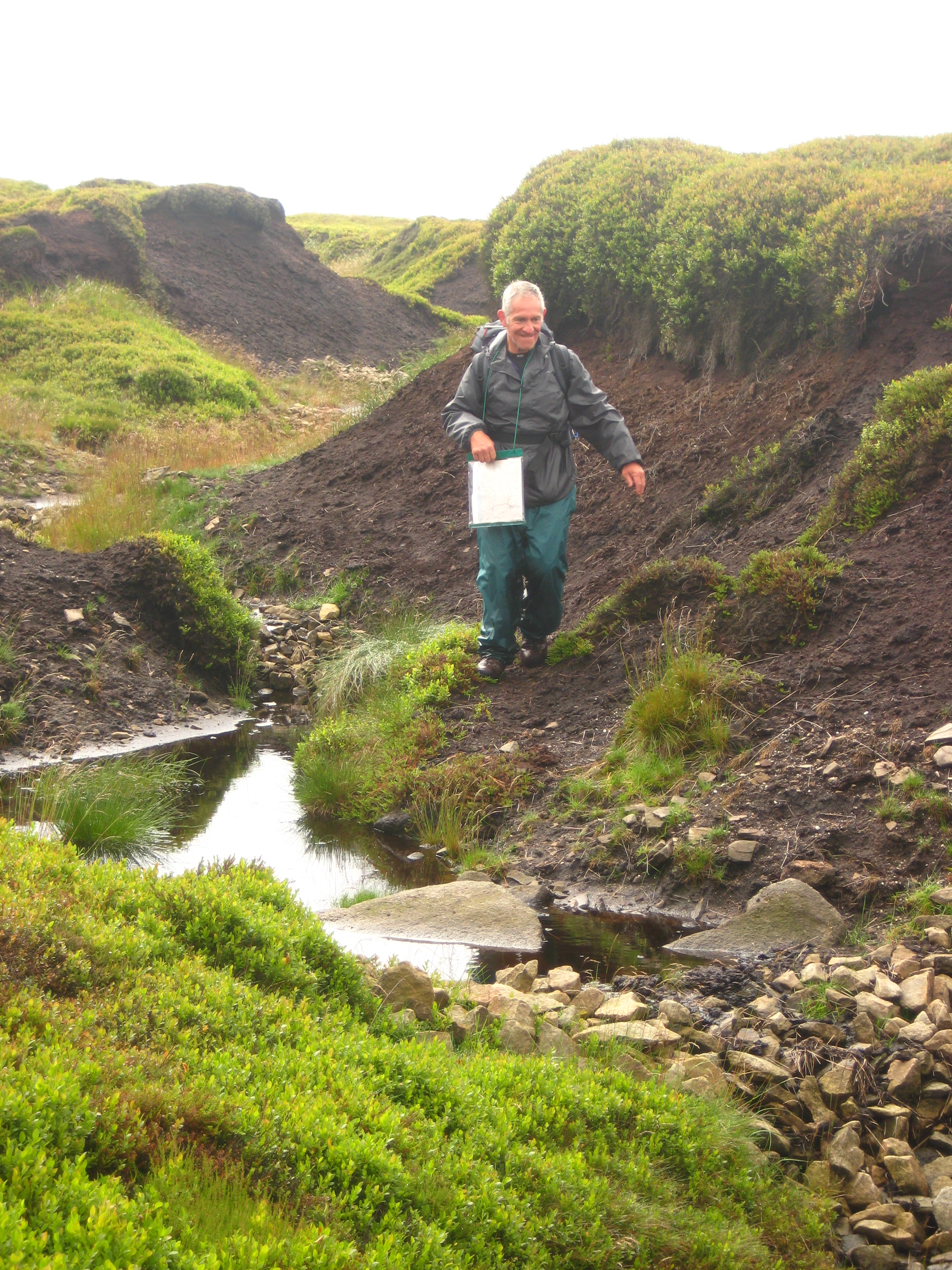
Example of eroded peat moorland, Bleaklow, Derbyshire

Moors for the Future is a partnership of public and private organisation to protect and promote moorland in the United Kingdom. Based in Edale in the Peak District National Park, much of the work carried out by Moors for the Future is in the National Park. The organisation works to promote the moors to the public for recreational use, as well as to raise important issues (such as ground nesting bird disturbance and moorland fires) that are associated with recreational use of the moors.

There is a team of researchers who look at the science of moorland restoration and its benefits. For example, peat is a huge store of carbon, so, if the moors degrade, the carbon could be released into the atmosphere. They also look at the effect climate change will have, and how much extra carbon can be locked up by a healthy growing peat bog.

Moors for the Future also work with land owners and others to restore areas of moorland. There are on-going efforts on Kinder Scout, Bleaklow and Black Hill. Funding of the MoorLife project (2010–15) means this will be extended to other areas of the South Pennines.

== Origins ==
Moors for the Future was launched in 2002 and is a partnership project. It is funded by the Peak District National Park Authority, the National Trust, Natural England, United Utilities, Severn Trent Water, Yorkshire Water, Environment Agency, Derbyshire County Council and Moorland Owners.
