= Rushop =

Village in the Peak District, England

Coordinates: 53.34°N 1.86°W

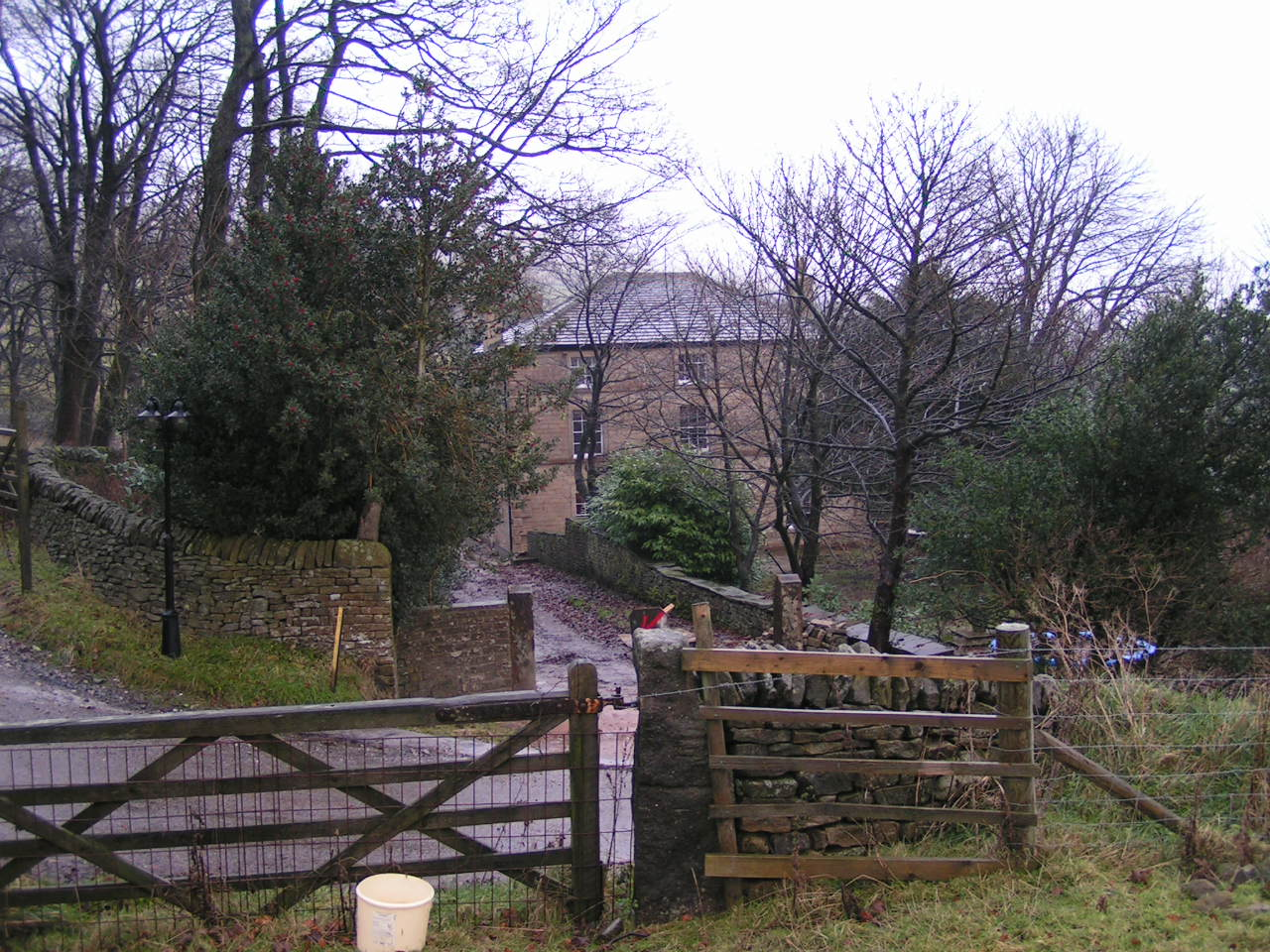
- Rushop Hall

- Location within Derbyshire
- OS grid reference: SK094825
- District: High Peak
- Shire county: Derbyshire
- Region: East Midlands
- Country: England
- Sovereign state: United Kingdom
- Post town: HIGH PEAK
- Postcode district: SK23
- Dialling code: 01298
- Police: Derbyshire
- Fire: Derbyshire
- Ambulance: East Midlands

Rushop or Rushup is a hamlet in Derbyshire, in the parish of Chapel-en-le-Frith. The main cluster of buildings lies on Rushup Lane, which connects the hamlet of Perryfoot to the south and the former A625 road, now unclassified, below Rushup Edge to the north.

There is archaeological and documentary evidence that there was a settlement at this site since before the Roman invasion of Britain. The settlement is alleged to have been a British village, under nominal Anglo Saxon rule after the fall of the area to Angles from Bernicia around 590, mainly due to the lack of Anglo Saxon placenames in the valley and the presence of names, such as Eccles, Inch and Pen-, which have origins in a Brythonic language of Britain.

Rushup Hall was built in the early 19th century and was designated as a Grade II listed building in 1984. The former turnpike road running from east to west north of the hamlet towards Chapel-en-le-Frith was part of the A625 (now A6187) until landslips at Mam Tor led to the closure of the main road in 1979, and the declassification of this section; a 19th-century milestone near the junction with Rushup Lane is also Grade II listed.

The Pennine Bridleway follows Rushup Lane.
