= Great Ridge =

Ridge in Derbyshire, England

Coordinates: 53°21′27″N 1°47′50″W

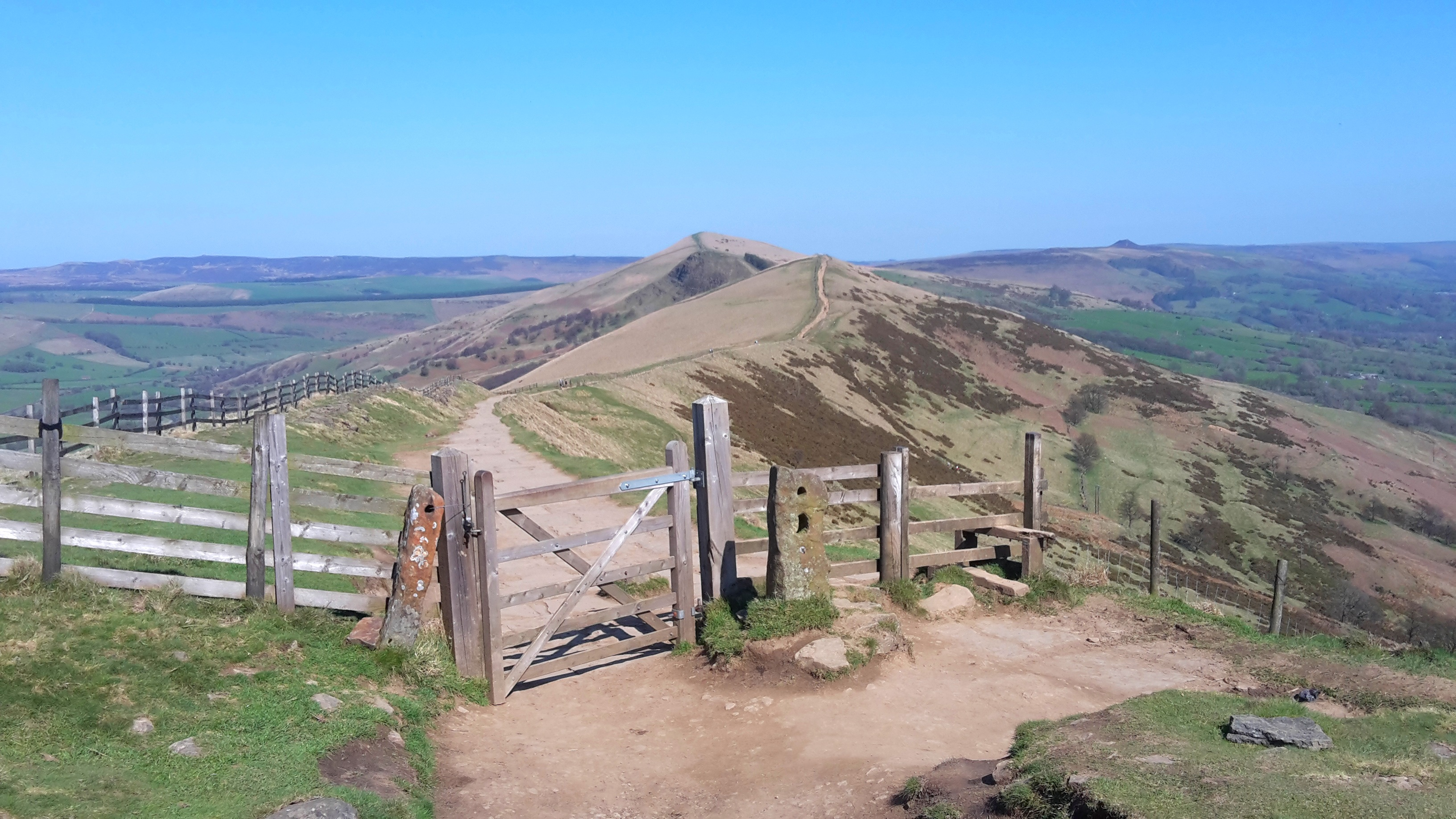
Great Ridge pathway

Great Ridge is a ridge separating the vales of Edale and Castleton in Derbyshire, England. It extends for approximately 3 kilometres (1.9 mi) from Mam Tor at the western end of the ridge to Lose Hill at the eastern end, the lowest point being Hollins Cross.

A path runs along the length of the ridge, and is roughly paved to prevent erosion caused by the large number of visitors. The only steep section of the path is Back Tor, just east of Hollins Cross, which may not be suitable for the very infirm.

West of Mam Tor, the high ground continues, slightly changing direction, as Rushup Edge.

The ridge is featured in the 2018 racing video game Forza Horizon 4 as part of the game's world.
