= Win Hill =

Hill in the Peak District, England

Coordinates: 53.36155°N 1.72198°W

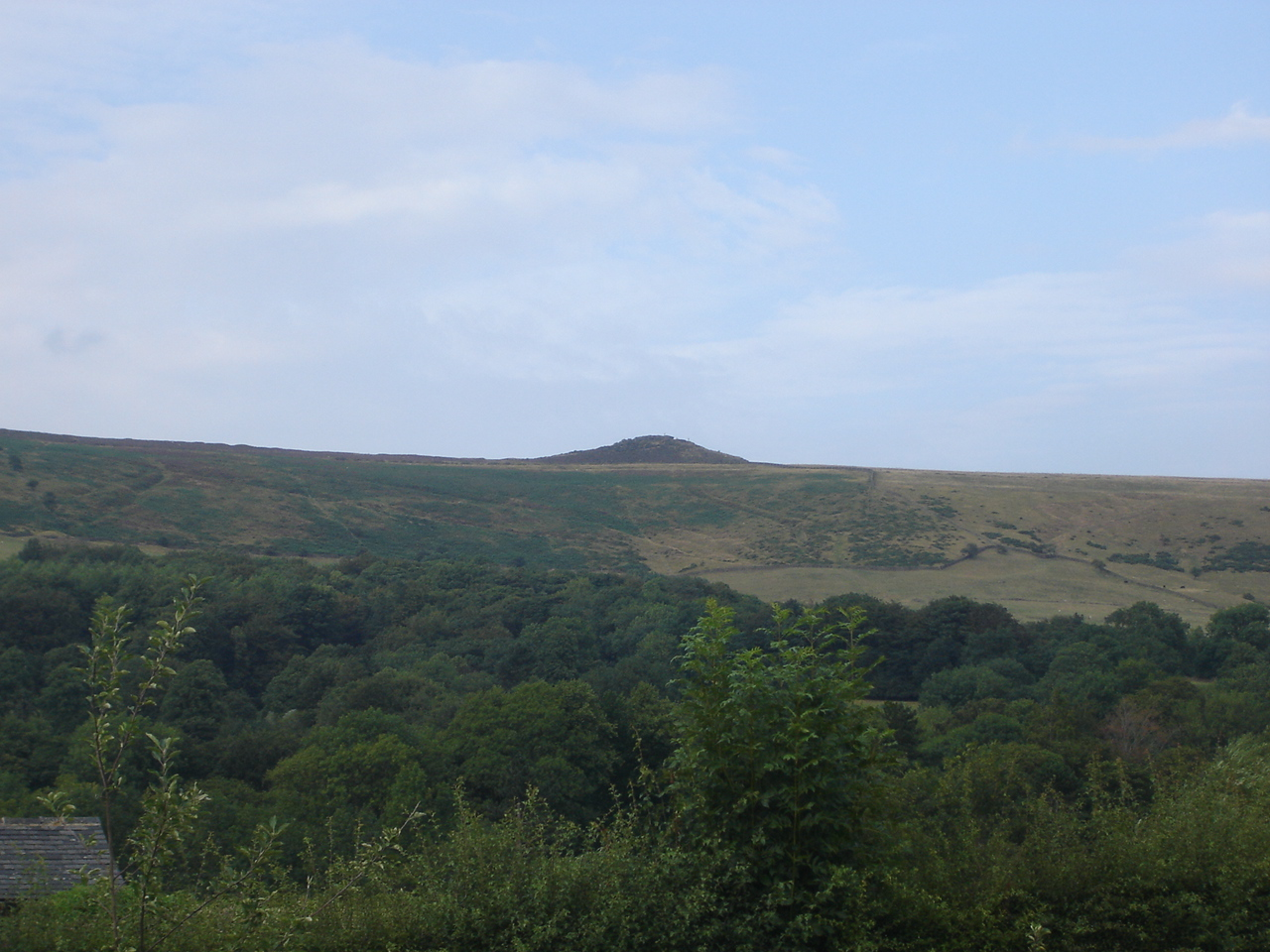

Highest point
- Elevation: 463 m (1,519 ft)
- Prominence: c. 144 m (472 ft)

Geography
- Location: Peak District, England
- OS grid: SK186850
- Topo map: OS Landranger 110

Win Hill is a hill north west of Bamford in the Derbyshire Peak District of England. Its summit is 462 m (1,516 ft) above sea level and it is bounded by the River Derwent to the east, the River Noe to the south west and Ladybower Reservoir to the north, with a ridge running north west linking it to Kinder Scout. The Roman road from Glossop over the Snake Pass crosses the ridge to the north and descends to Hope and the old Roman base of Brough in the Hope Valley, with the Hope Cross, a marker post dating from 1737, at the highest point of the road.

On top of Win Hill lies Win Hill Pike, locally known as the Pimple. Win Hill Pike has an Ordnance Survey triangulation point, or trig point. Sometimes misnamed the Old Witches Knoll, Win Hill Pike is often used for a Duke of Edinburgh Award station.

Win Hill is commonly ascended from Yorkshire Bridge or Hope. The ascent from Yorkshire Bridge is a steep climb of 300 metres (980 ft) in 1.2 km (3/4 mi) by Parkin Clough, first through woods then over the moor to the top. Routes from Hope are gentler, either via Twitchill Farm or the villages of Aston and Thornhill. Depending on direction of travel, Win Hill is either the first or last hill on the Derwent Watershed and Edale Horseshoe challenge walks.

With around 144 m (472 ft) of relative height, Win Hill is only a few metres short of qualifying as a Marilyn.

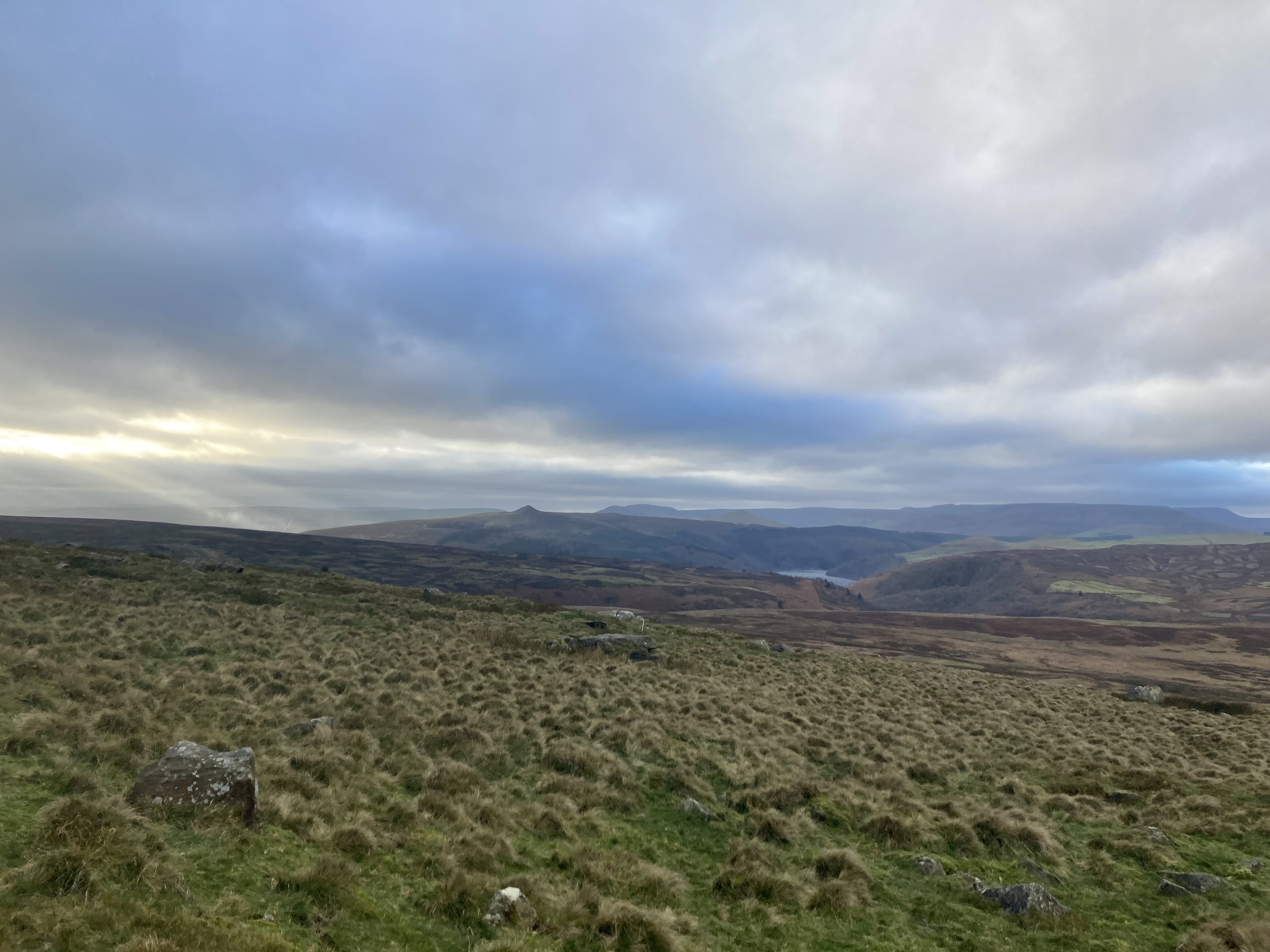
Win Hill from Stanage Edge. Ladybower Reservoir in the foreground, Great Ridge and Kinder Scout in the background.

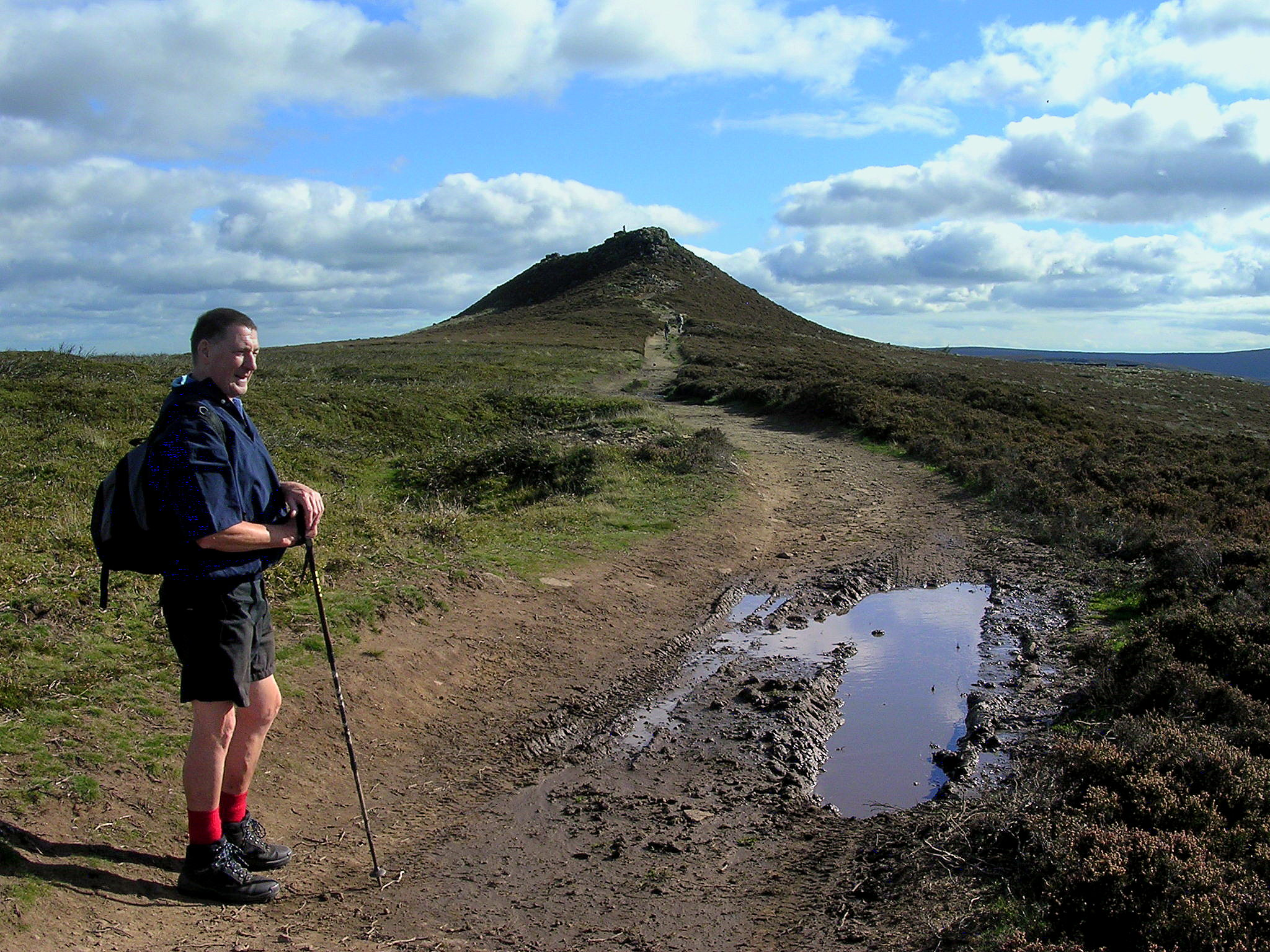
The approach to Win Hill Pike

The hill's counterpart, Lose Hill, lies to the west on the opposite side of the River Noe. In relatively recent times, the two hills' names have prompted a fanciful tale concerning the outcome of an imagined 7th-century battle between the forces of Edwin of Northumbria and Cynegils of Wessex. Edwin's forces occupied Win Hill, while Cynegils' men camped on Lose Hill. As the battle progressed, Cynegils' forces advanced up Win Hill, and Edwin's retreated behind a temporary wall they had built near the summit. They pushed the boulders of the wall downhill, crushing the Wessex soldiers and gaining victory in the battle. However, there is no historical basis for the tale, and no evidence of any battle ever being fought here. A more prosaic explanation for the name is that Win Hill was originally recorded as Wythinehull, meaning "Withy Hill" or "Willow Hill". Fragments of willow can still be found in the otherwise largely coniferous plantation on the approach from Yorkshire Bridge.
