= Edale =

Village and parish in the Peak District, England

Coordinates: 53.366°N 1.816°W

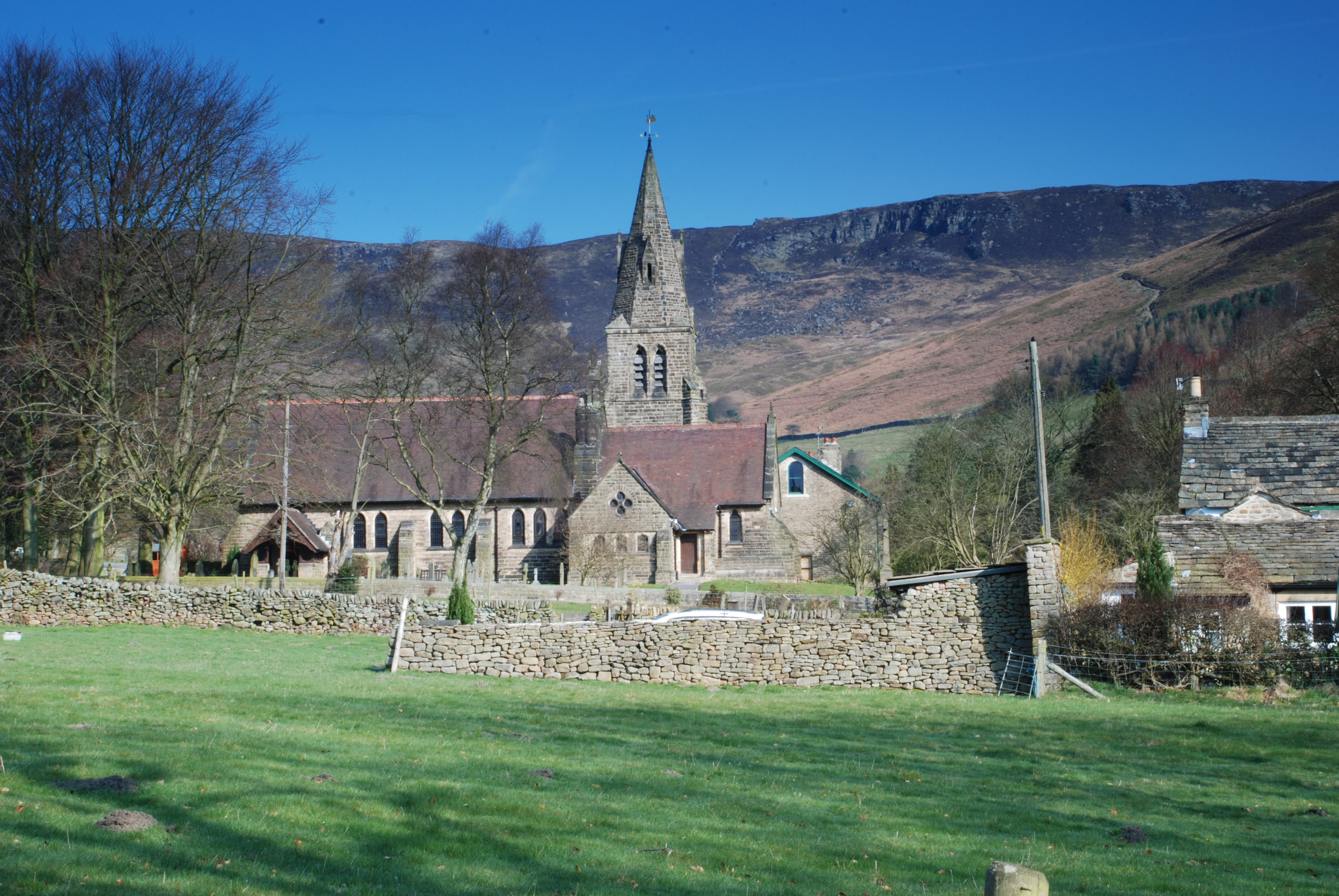
- Holy Trinity parish church

- Location within Derbyshire
- Population: 353 (2011 Census)
- OS grid reference: SK122856
- District: High Peak
- Shire county: Derbyshire
- Region: East Midlands
- Country: England
- Sovereign state: United Kingdom
- Post town: HOPE VALLEY
- Postcode district: S33
- Dialling code: 01433
- Police: Derbyshire
- Fire: Derbyshire
- Ambulance: East Midlands
- UK Parliament: High Peak

Edale /ˈiːdeɪl/ is a village and civil parish in the Peak District, Derbyshire, England, whose population was 353 at the 2011 Census. Edale, with an area of 7,030 acres (2,840 ha), is in the Borough of High Peak.

Edale is best known to walkers as the start, or southern end, of the Pennine Way and, to less ambitious walkers, as a starting point for evening or day walks. The village is accessible by generally hourly railway services from Sheffield and Manchester. There are two pubs serving real ale and food.

== History ==
As spelt, the name is first recorded in 1732. Earlier recorded versions of the name are Aidele (1086), Heydale (1251), Eydale (1275), Eydal (1285) and Edall (1550).

Historically, Edale was the name of the valley of the River Noe. From the Norman Conquest of England it was in the royal Forest of High Peak and at its centre is the Edale Cross, which marked the boundary of the three wards at the Forest, Campana, Hopedale and Longdendale. Settlement in the valley consists of several booths, originally established in the 13th century as 'vaccaries' (cattle farms) along the valley of the River Noe, which have since developed into the hamlets of Upper Booth (once Crowdenley Booth and Over Booth), Barber Booth (once Whitmorely Booth), Grindsbrook Booth, Ollerbrook Booth and Nether Booth (also known as Lady Booth and, formerly, Lower Booth).

=== Cotton mill ===
Edale is the site of a historic cotton mill built in 1795 on the site of a corn mill and tannery by Nicholas Cresswell in partnership with James Harrison, Robert Blackwell and Joseph Fletcher. Workers were brought in from the towns and accommodated in cottages and in a nearby house called Skinner's Hall. Many of the women workers walked each day from Castleton over the thousand-foot Hollins Cross pass. The mill continued spinning cotton until around 1940 but then fell into disuse. It was restored in the early 1970s by the Landmark Trust who have since sold off all of the apartments.

== Countryside ==
As well as being the start of the Pennine Way (the official start is the Old Nag's Head, a former smithy dating back to 1577), the village is surrounded by walking country which is excellent in its own right. The village lies in the Vale of Edale and is surrounded by hills: the plateau of Kinder Scout to the north, where the highest point in the parish is found, the Great Ridge (running west to east between Rushup Edge over Mam Tor to Lose Hill) to the south and east, Win Hill to the east (outside the parish), and Dalehead (Brown Knoll, Horsehill Tor and Colborne) to the west. Almost the entire parish is over 200m above sea level; only along the River Noe east from Carr House does the elevation drop below this level.

The bed and banks of the River Noe from Barber Booth upstream to approximately the 320-metre (1,050 ft) contour constitute the Edale SSSI, cited for geological interest. The "important exposures" of the Edale Shales here contain fossils of technical interest.

== Amenities ==
There is a youth hostel about a mile from the village centre, several B&Bs and both pubs also provide accommodation and food. There are also two cafés and a general store with a post office.

In 2006, a new information and visitor centre was opened at Fieldhead; it was developed by the Moors for the Future partnership and is owned and operated by the Peak District National Park Authority. While Moors for the Future continue to operate on the site, the visitor centre was closed down in 2025.

Edale is also a popular camping village, with two major campsites and numerous others in the surrounding area.

== Media ==
Regional TV news comes from Leeds-based BBC Yorkshire and ITV Yorkshire. Television signals are received from the local relay transmitter.

Local radio stations are BBC Radio Derby and Greatest Hits Radio Derbyshire (High Peak) (formerly High Peak Radio).

The village is served by the local newspapers the Peak Advertiser and the Buxton Advertiser.

== Transport ==
Edale railway station lies on the trans-Pennine Hope Valley Line and receives a reasonably frequent service for such a rural area. The typical off-peak is one train an hour in both directions, with some gaps at certain times of the day, to Sheffield and to Manchester Piccadilly via Marple. Services are operated by Northern Trains.

The short but narrow, twisting and dead-end road to the village centre is not suitable for visitors' cars and parking in the village centre is almost impossible. However, there is a large pay-and-display car park near the village hall and parking for rail users at the railway station. Additional parking near the station is provided at busy times by the Parish Council.

== Notable residents ==
- Nicholas Cresswell (1750–1804), native farmer, explorer and diarist in America 1774–1777
- Anthony Favell (born 1939), politician, MP for Stockport, 1983 to 1992.
- Berlie Doherty (born 1943), novelist, poet, playwright and screenwriter.,
- Peter Cropper (1945–2015), violinist, leader of the Lindsay String Quartet.
- Mark Wallington (born 1953), writer, known for his humorous Boogie travelogues,
- Bella Hardy (born 1984), contemporary folk musician, singer and songwriter.

== See also ==
- Listed buildings in Edale

== Gallery ==
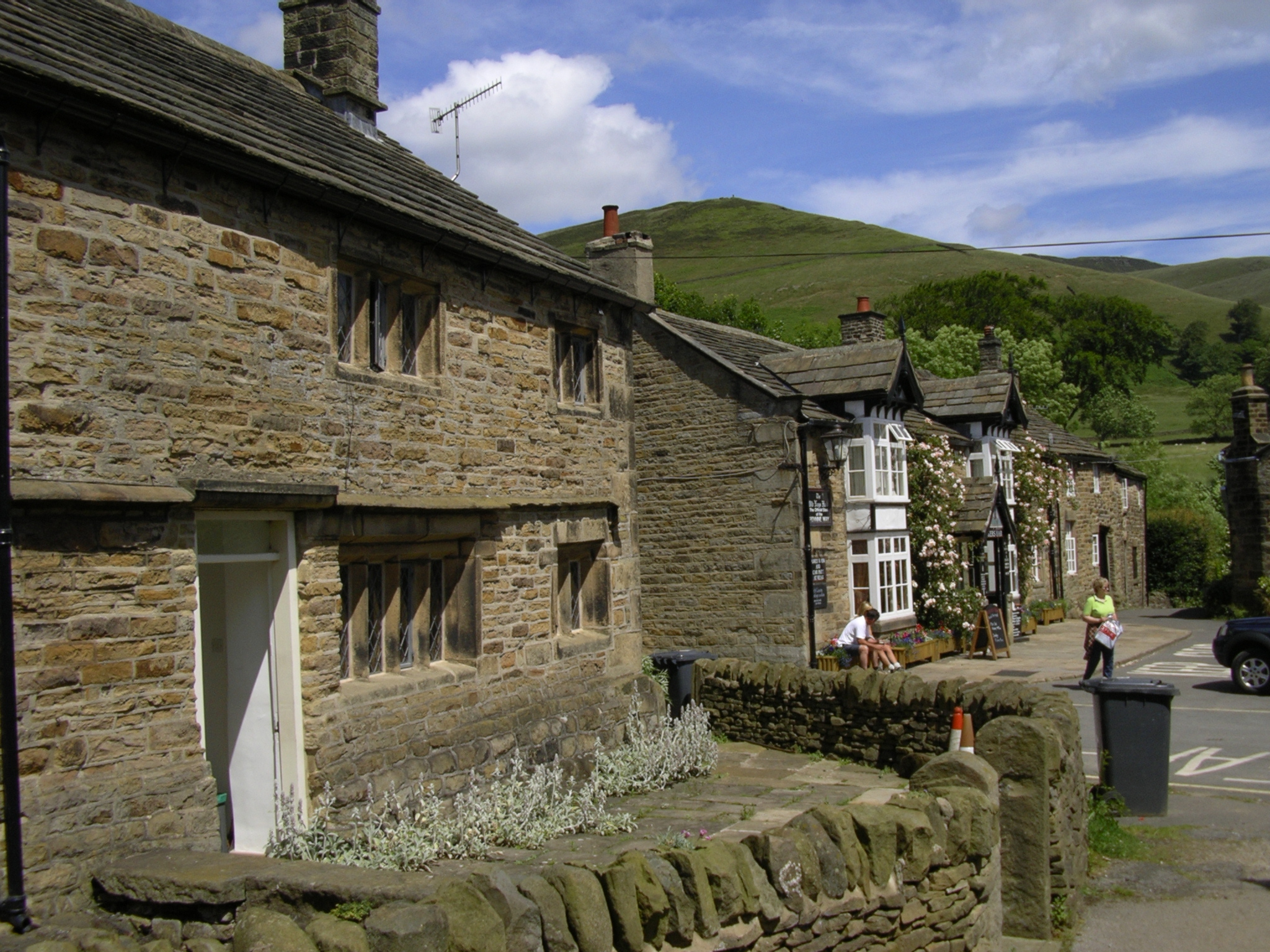
Grindsbrook Booth, Edale

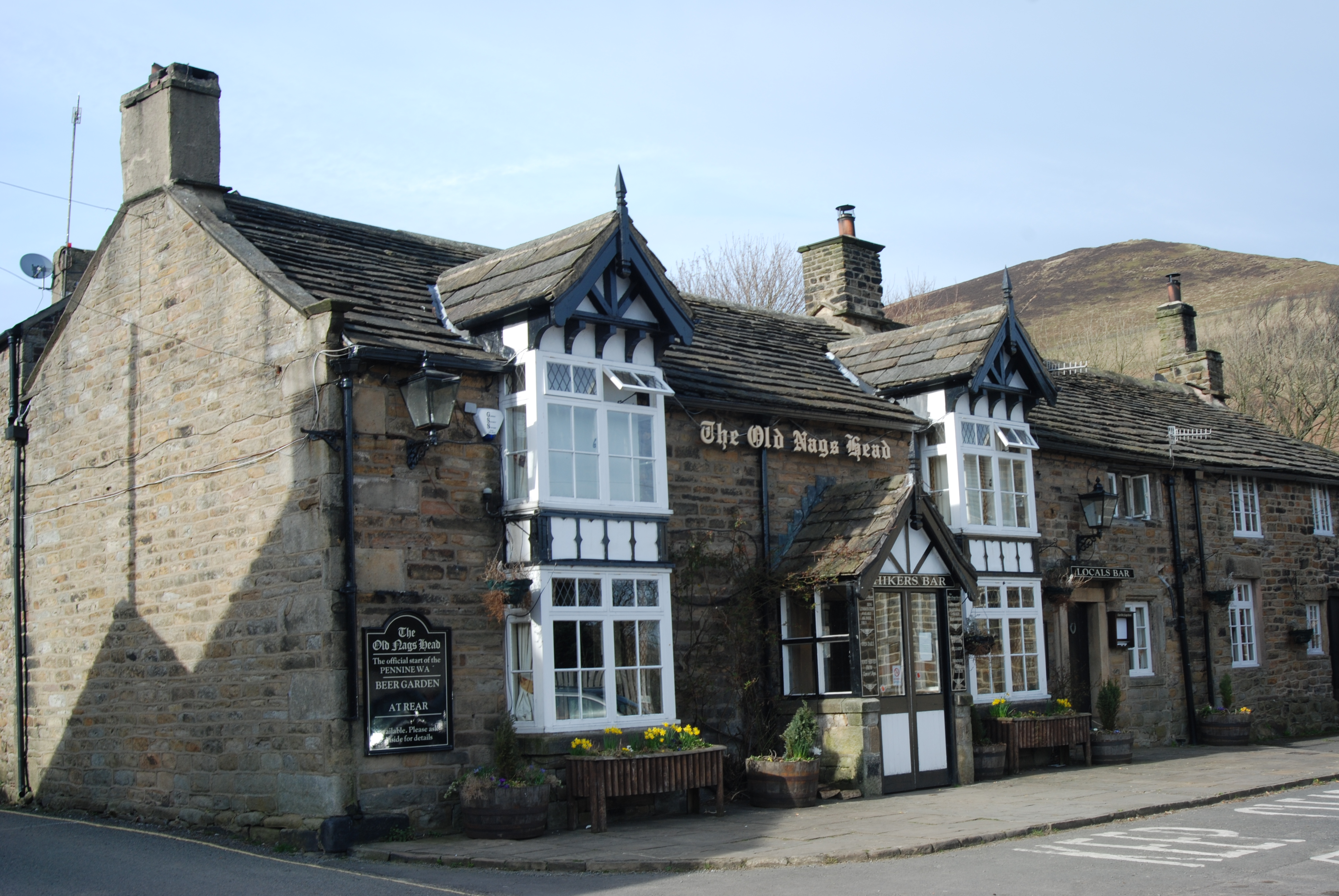
The Old Nags Head pub

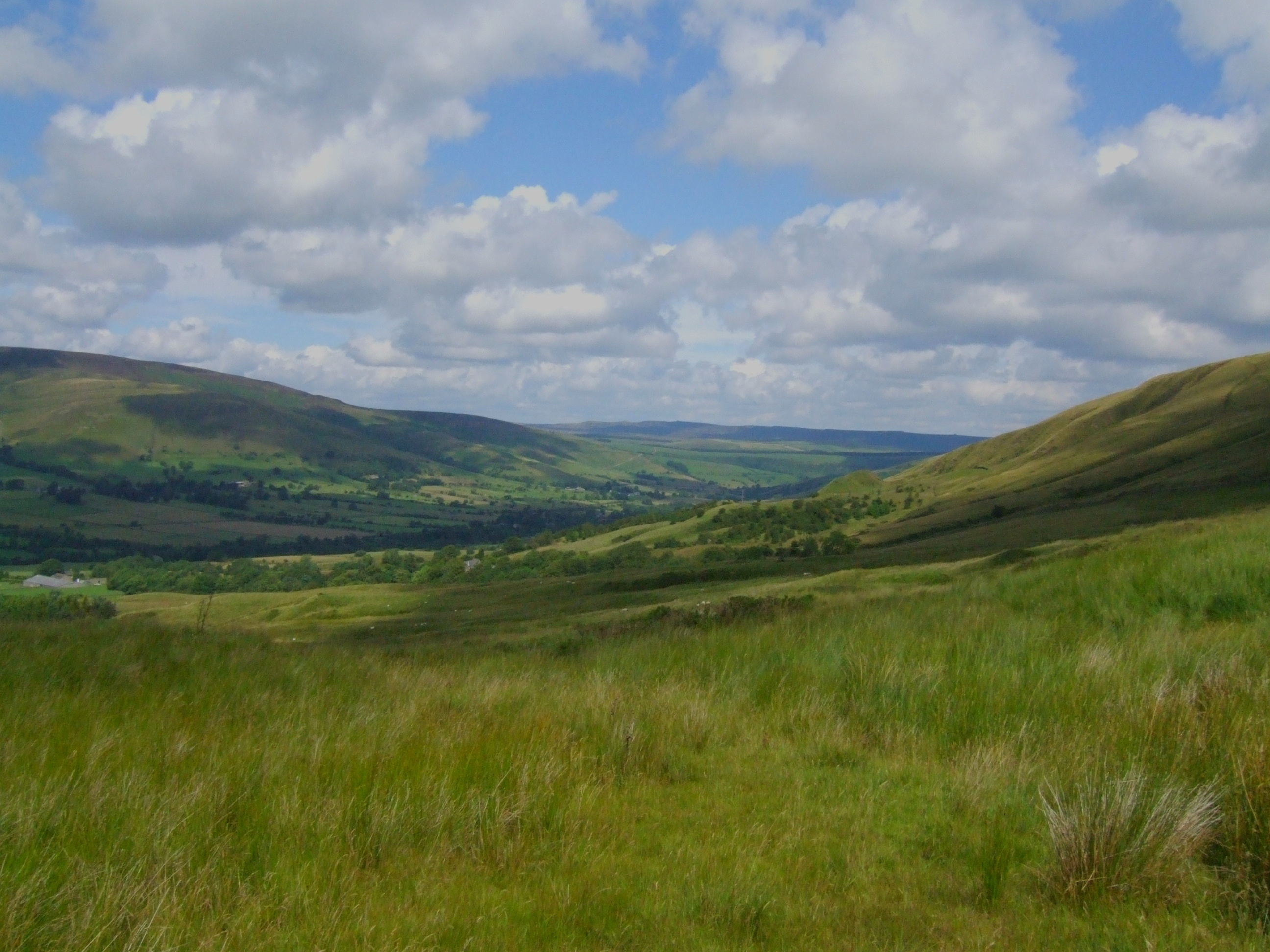
Vale of Edale

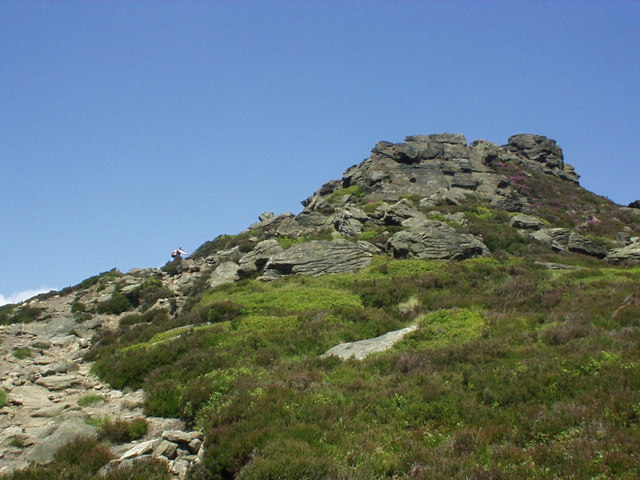
Ringing Roger

== Panorama ==
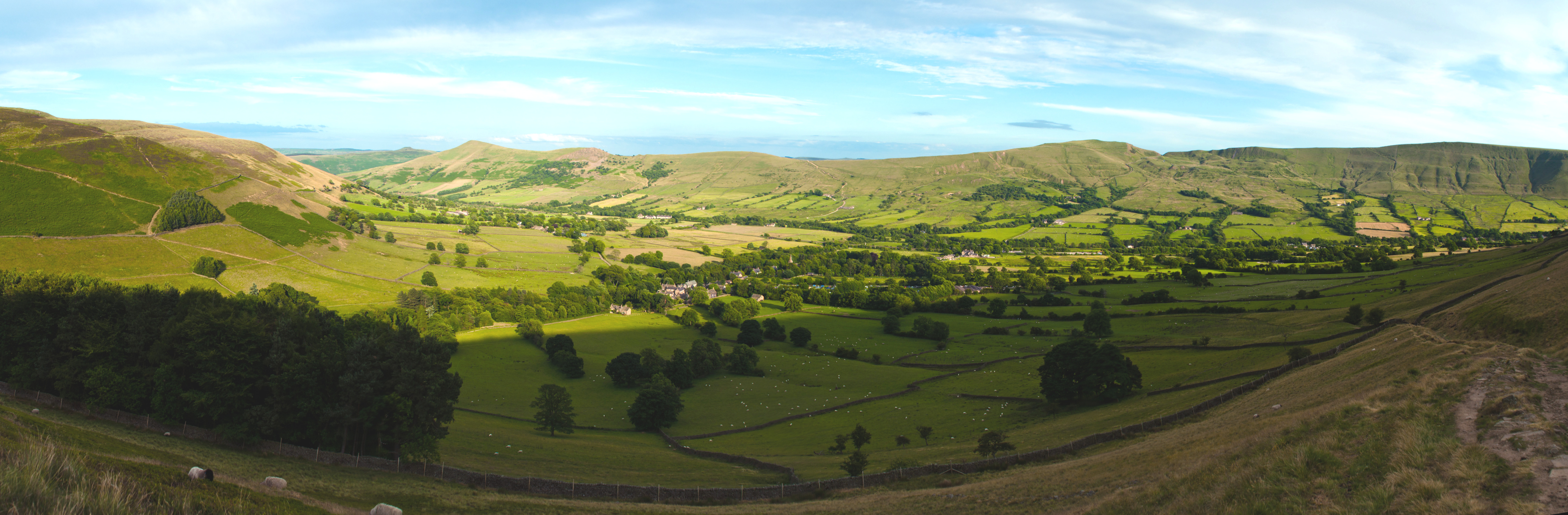
180° view from the Vale of Edale, approximately 1km from the Old Nag's Head. The village is in the centre of the picture partly obscured by trees.
