= Lose Hill =

Hill in Derbyshire, England

Coordinates: 53.36525°N 1.77154°W

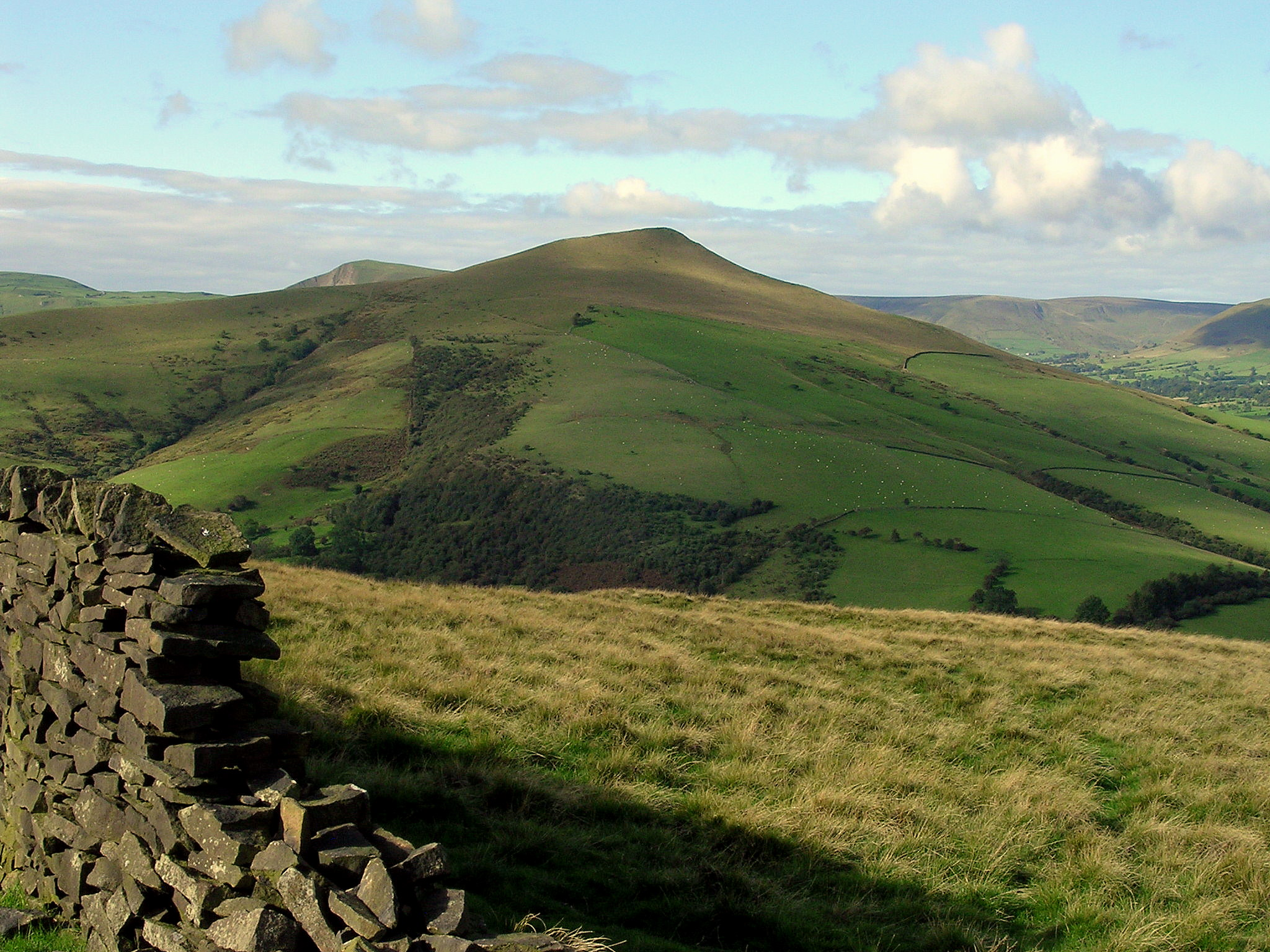
- Lose Hill as seen from approach to Win Hill

Highest point
- Elevation: 476 m (1,562 ft)
- Prominence: 76 m (249 ft)

Geography
- Location: Peak District, England
- OS grid: SK153854
- Topo map: OS Landranger 110

Lose Hill lies in the Derbyshire Peak District. It is the south-east corner of the parish of Edale and the end of the Great Ridge that runs from Rushup Edge to the west (over Mam Tor, Hollins Cross and Back Tor).

Local access activist G. H. B. Ward was given an area of Lose Hill by the Sheffield and District Federation of the Ramblers Association in 1945, which was named Ward's Piece; he subsequently presented this to the National Trust.

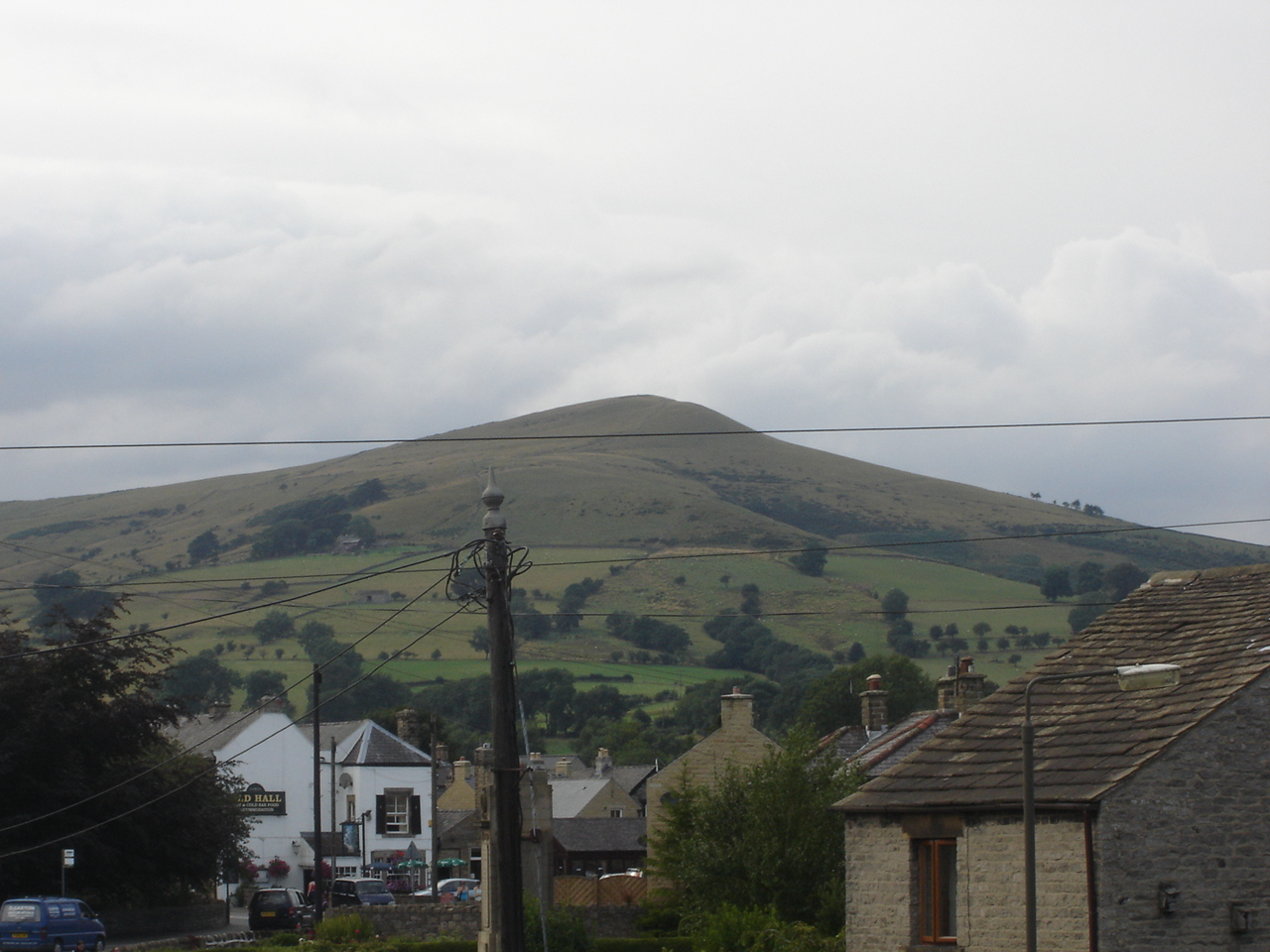
Lose Hill as seen from Hope village

Suggested explanations for the name of Lose Hill include that it derives from the Old English hlose, meaning pigsties, or that it may be a corruption of ‘loose’, as in ‘free land’. Another author (Murray) argues that Lose Hill should actually be called Laws Hill.

The hill's counterpart, Win Hill, lies to the east on the opposite side of the River Noe. In relatively recent times, the two hills' names have prompted a fanciful tale concerning the outcome of an imagined 7th-century battle between the forces of Edwin of Northumbria and Cynegils of Wessex. Edwin's forces occupied Win Hill, while Cynegils' men camped on Lose Hill. As the battle progressed, Cynegils' forces advanced up Win Hill, and Edwin's retreated behind a temporary wall they had built near the summit. They pushed the boulders of the wall downhill, crushing the Wessex soldiers and gaining victory in the battle. However, there is no historical basis for the tale, and no evidence of any battle ever being fought here.

== See also ==
- Win Hill
