= Mam Tor =

Hill near Castleton in the High Peak of Derbyshire, England

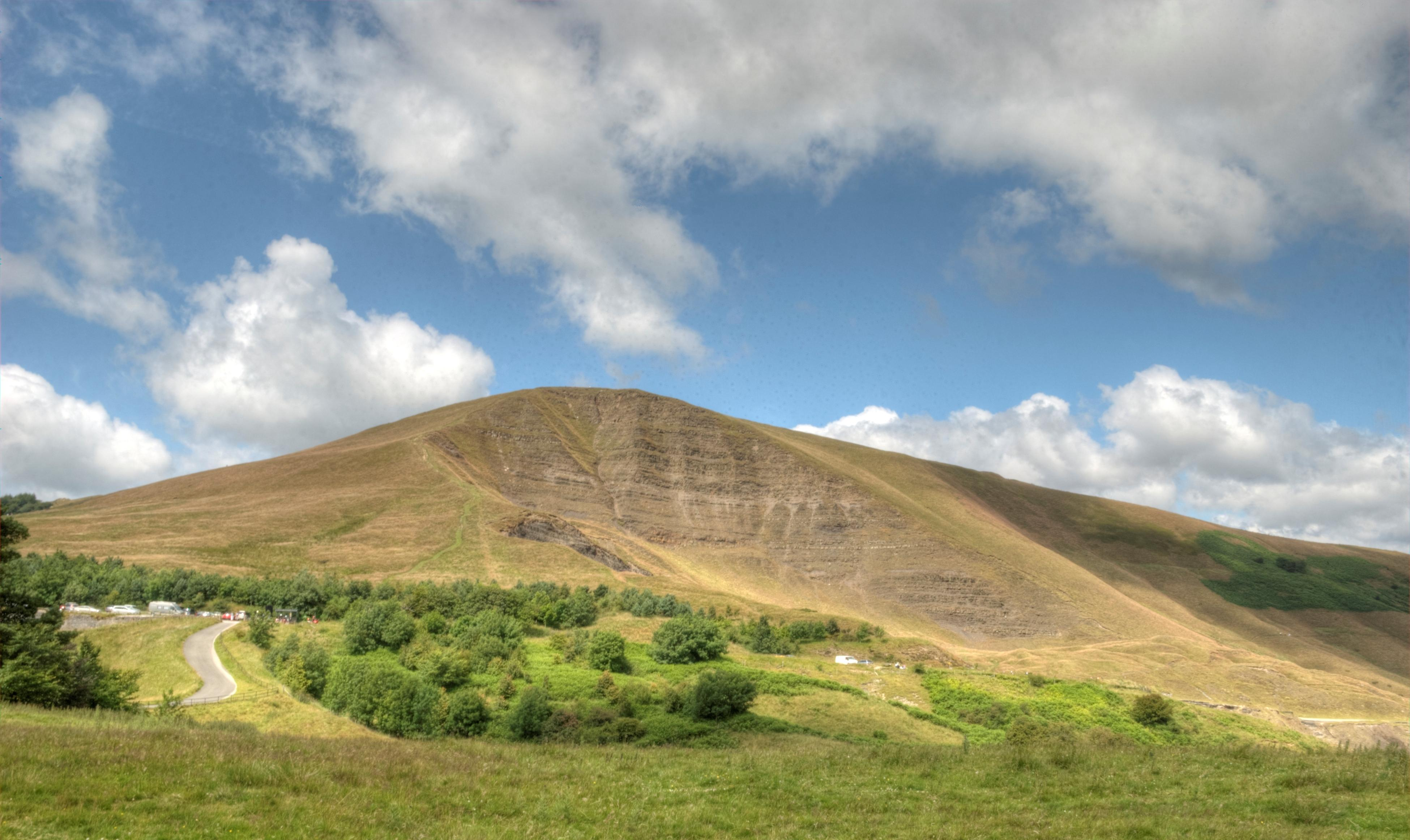
- Mam Tor, July 2011

Highest point
- Elevation: 517 m (1,696 ft)
- Prominence: 62 m (203 ft)
- Parent peak: Kinder Scout
- Listing: Dewey
- Coordinates: 53°20′57″N 1°48′38″W

Geography
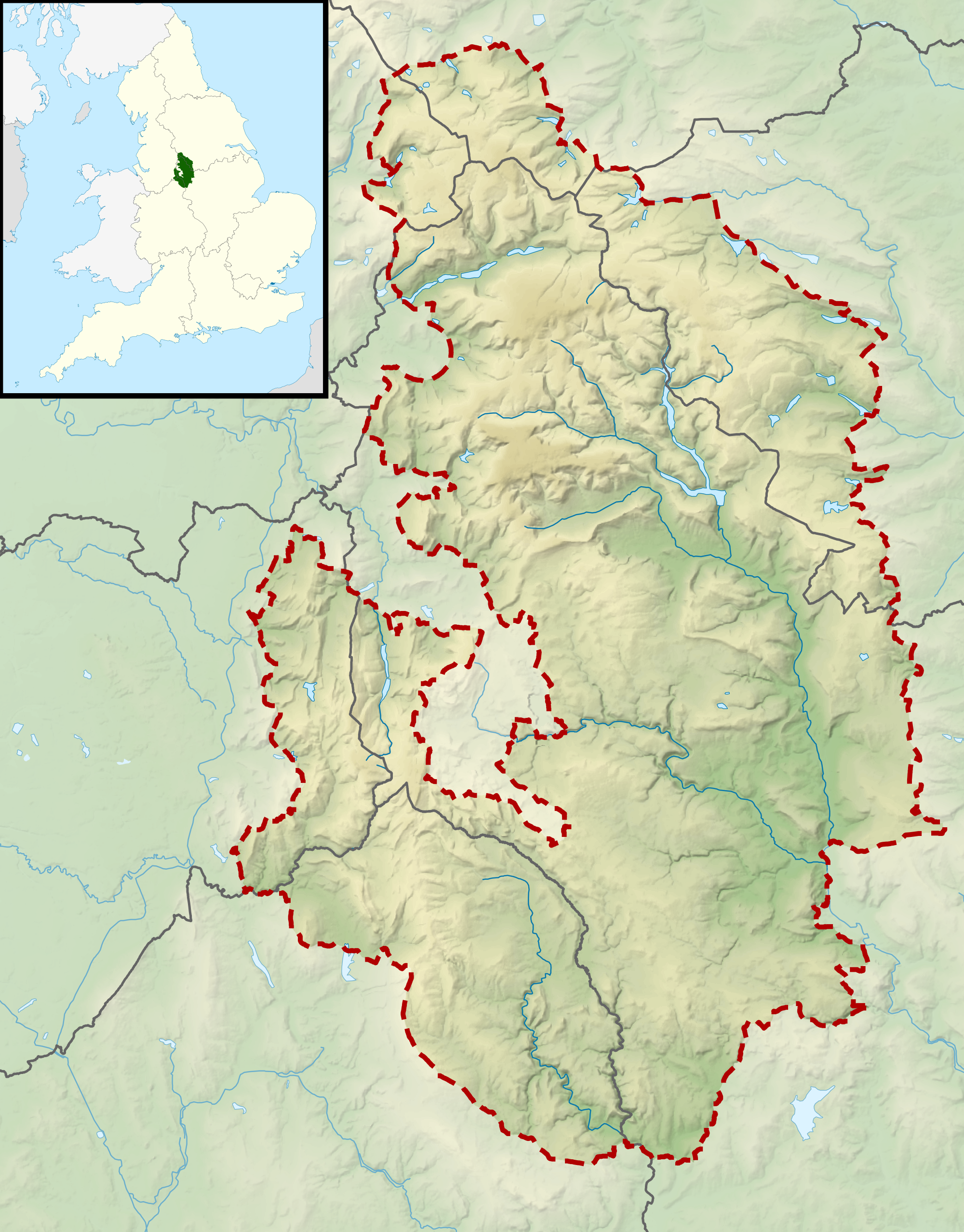
- Location within the Peak District Location within Derbyshire
- Location: Derbyshire, England
- Parent range: Peak District
- OS grid: SK127836
- Topo map: OS Explorer OL1 OS Landranger 110

Mam Tor is a 517 m (1,696 ft) hill near Castleton in the High Peak of Derbyshire, England. Its name means "mother hill", so called because frequent landslips on its eastern face have resulted in a multitude of "mini-hills" beneath it. These landslips, which are caused by unstable lower layers of shale, also give the hill its alternative name of Shivering Mountain.

In 1979, the continual battle to maintain the A625 road (Sheffield to Chapel en le Frith) on the crumbling eastern side of the hill was lost when the road officially closed as a through-route, with the Fox House to Castleton section of the road being re-designated as the A6187.

The hill is crowned by a late Bronze Age and early Iron Age univallate hill fort, and two Bronze Age bowl barrows. At the base of the Tor and nearby are four show caves: Blue John Cavern, Speedwell Cavern, Peak Cavern and Treak Cliff Cavern where lead, Blue John, fluorspar and other minerals were once mined. Mam Tor was declared to be one of the Seven Wonders of the Peak by Thomas Hobbes in his 1636 book De Mirabilibus Pecci.

== Geography ==
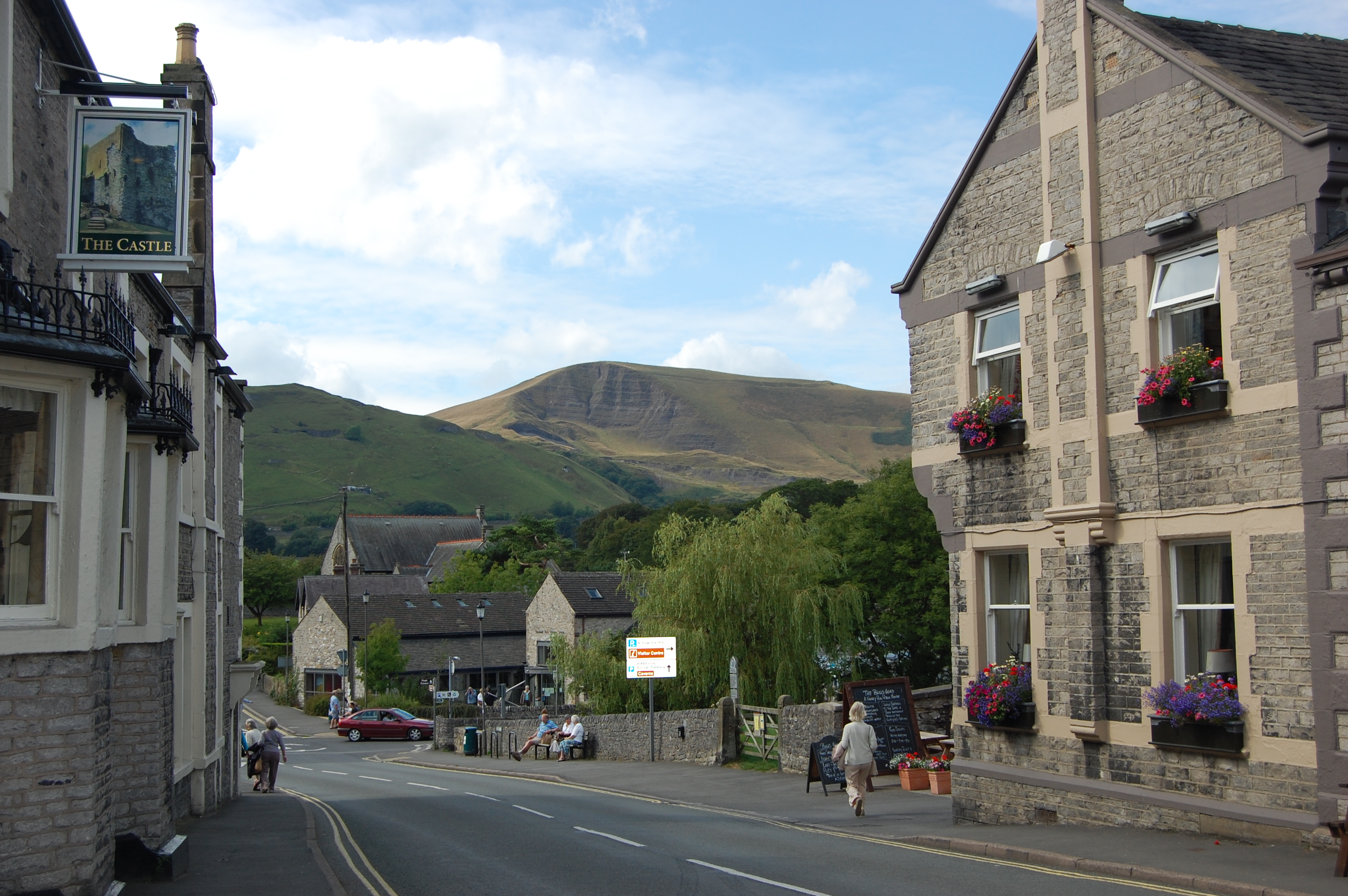
Mam Tor dominates the skyline west of Castleton

Mam Tor is on the southern edge of the Dark Peak (sandstones) and overlooks the White Peak (limestones), including the dry gorge of Winnats Pass. It is a dominating link between the eastern end of Rushup Edge and the western end of the Great Ridge, which together separate the Hope Valley to the south from Edale to the north, and is a popular ridgewalk.

Mam Tor is made of rocks of Carboniferous age, approximately 320 million years old. The base of Mam Tor is composed of black shales of the Bowland Shale Formation of Serpukhovian age overlain by turbiditic sandstone of the Mam Tor Sandstone Formation of Bashkirian age.

== Landslides ==
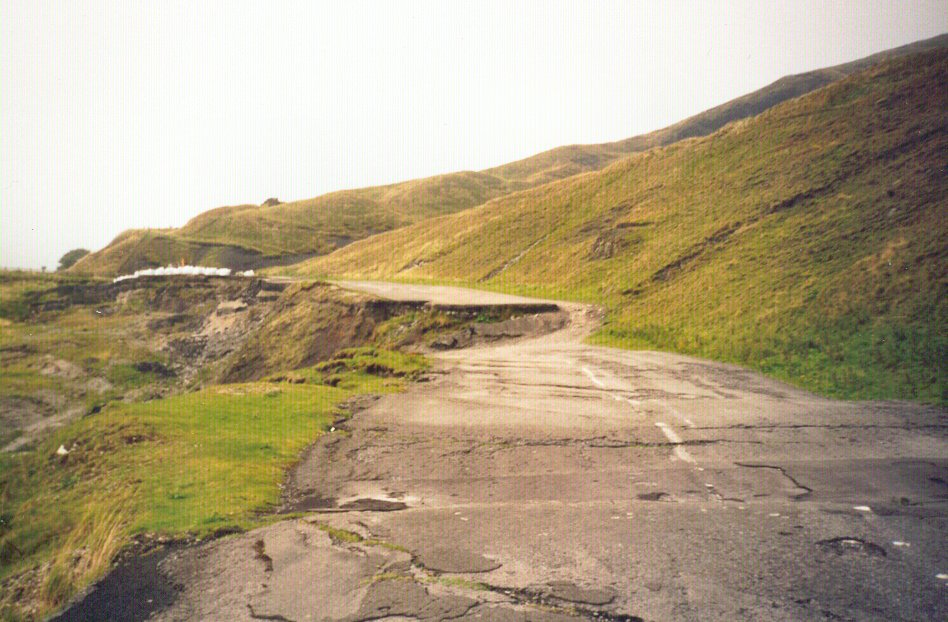
Section of the abandoned road

A feature of Mam Tor is the active landslide which invades its southeast side almost to the summit, and interrupts the ramparts of the hillfort, unless its builders used it as part of the defences. This rotational landslide began roughly 4,000 years ago. The toe is a debris flow. The landslide is due to weak shales underlying sandstones, a common phenomenon all around the Dark Peak, notably at Alport Castles, Longdendale, Glossop and Canyards Hills, Sheffield. Indeed, three larger landslides occur on the north side of Mam Tor, one of them cutting the main ridge at Mam Nick which allows a minor road over into Edale; another creates the striking crag of Back Tor well seen from Mam Tor.

Evidence for the continued movement of the slide mass is demonstrated graphically by the severe damage to the old Mam Tor road that traversed this flow. The road was built at the beginning of the 1800s and was subsequently relaid until local authorities closed it in 1979. Layers of tarmac and gravel are up to 2 metres (6 ft 7 in) thick in places, demonstrating the numerous efforts to keep the road open. A short tunnel could readily have been made avoiding the landslip zone, but the opportunity to exclude heavy business and lorry traffic from the middle of the National Park was preferred. A local diversion for light vehicles follows the limestone gorge of Winnats Pass. This is one of the most extreme cases of geological problems affecting main transport systems in Britain, comparable with the railway at Dawlish.

Current mean annual movement is "up to 0.25 m; this increases greatly when winter rainfalls exceed thresholds of both 210 mm/month and 750 mm in the preceding six months". The debris flow poses no threat to any inhabited buildings; however, small farm buildings lying in the flow's path may soon be overwhelmed assuming a flow rate similar to that of the present. The 2000 study suggests that deep drainage may be the most effective means of stabilising the flow, though this may not completely stop movement.

== Prehistory ==
The summit of Mam Tor is encircled by a late Bronze Age and early Iron Age univallate hill fort. Radiocarbon analysis suggests occupation from around 1200 BC. The earliest remaining features are two Bronze Age burial mounds, one just below the summit and the other on the summit itself, though now buried under the paving. At a later stage over a hundred small platforms were levelled into the hill near the summit, allowing inhabited timber huts to be constructed. The hill fort and burial mounds are a Scheduled Ancient Monument.

== Gallery ==
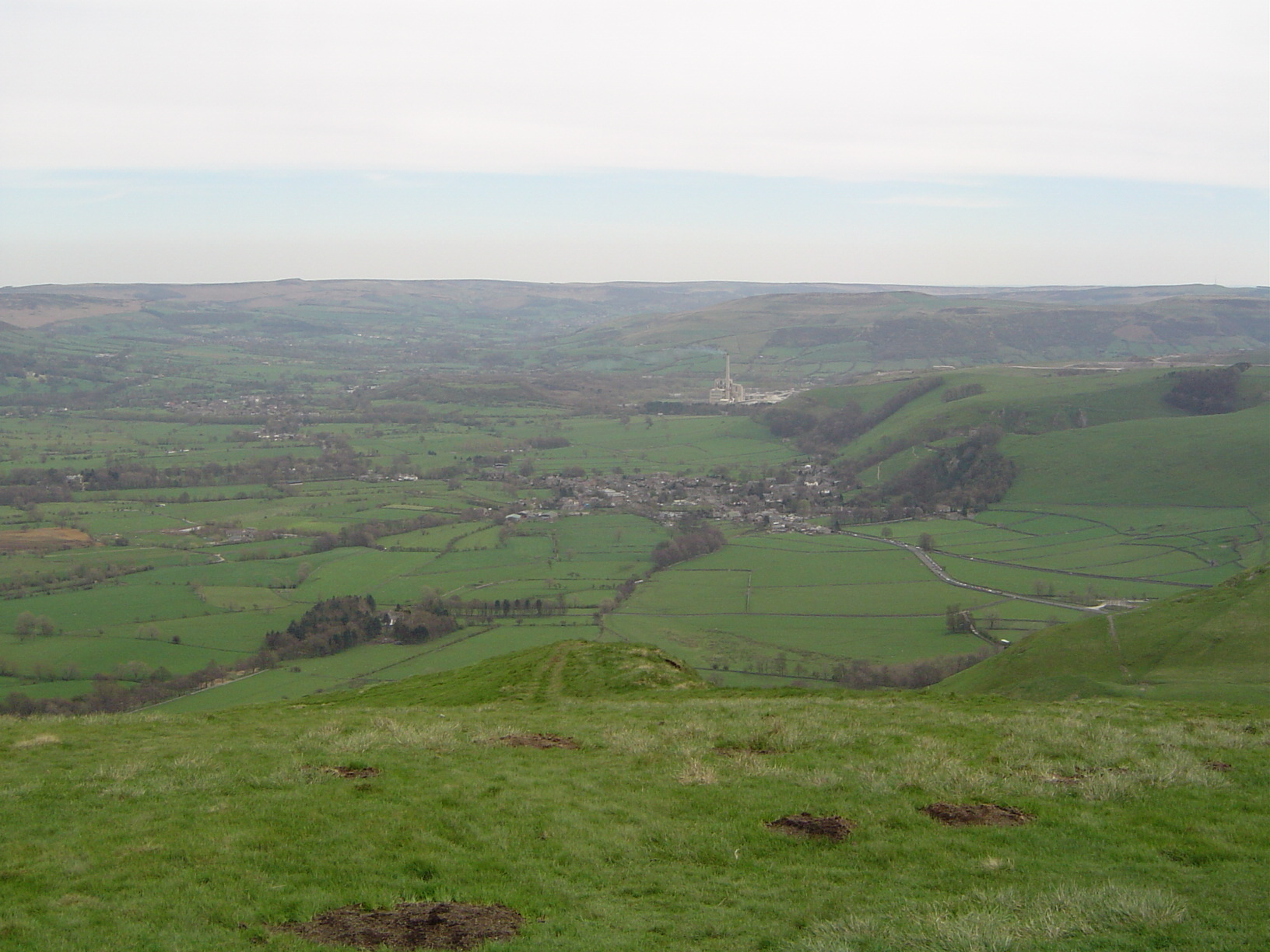
View of the village of Castleton from Mam Tor with Hope cement works in the background

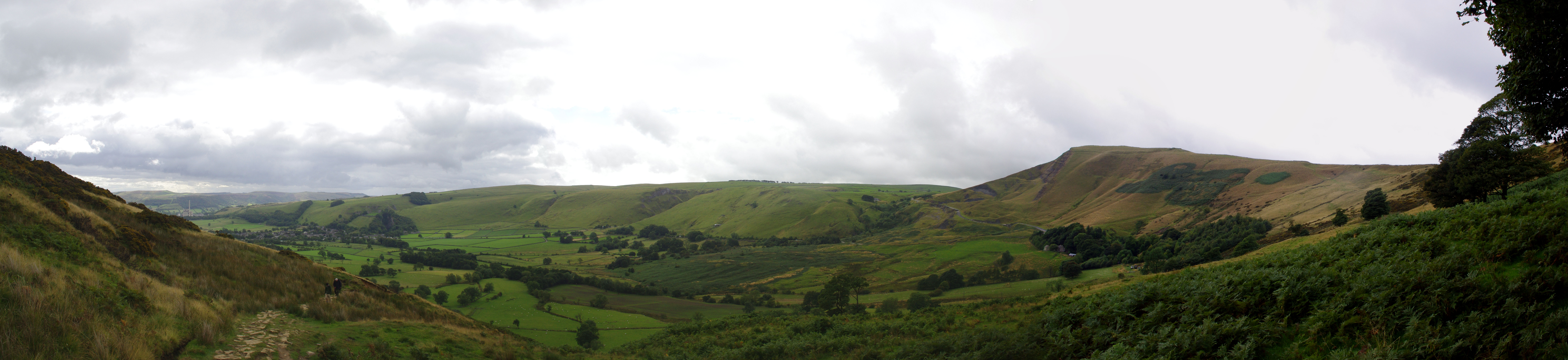
Panoramic view overlooking Hope Valley from a trail heading towards Hollins Cross

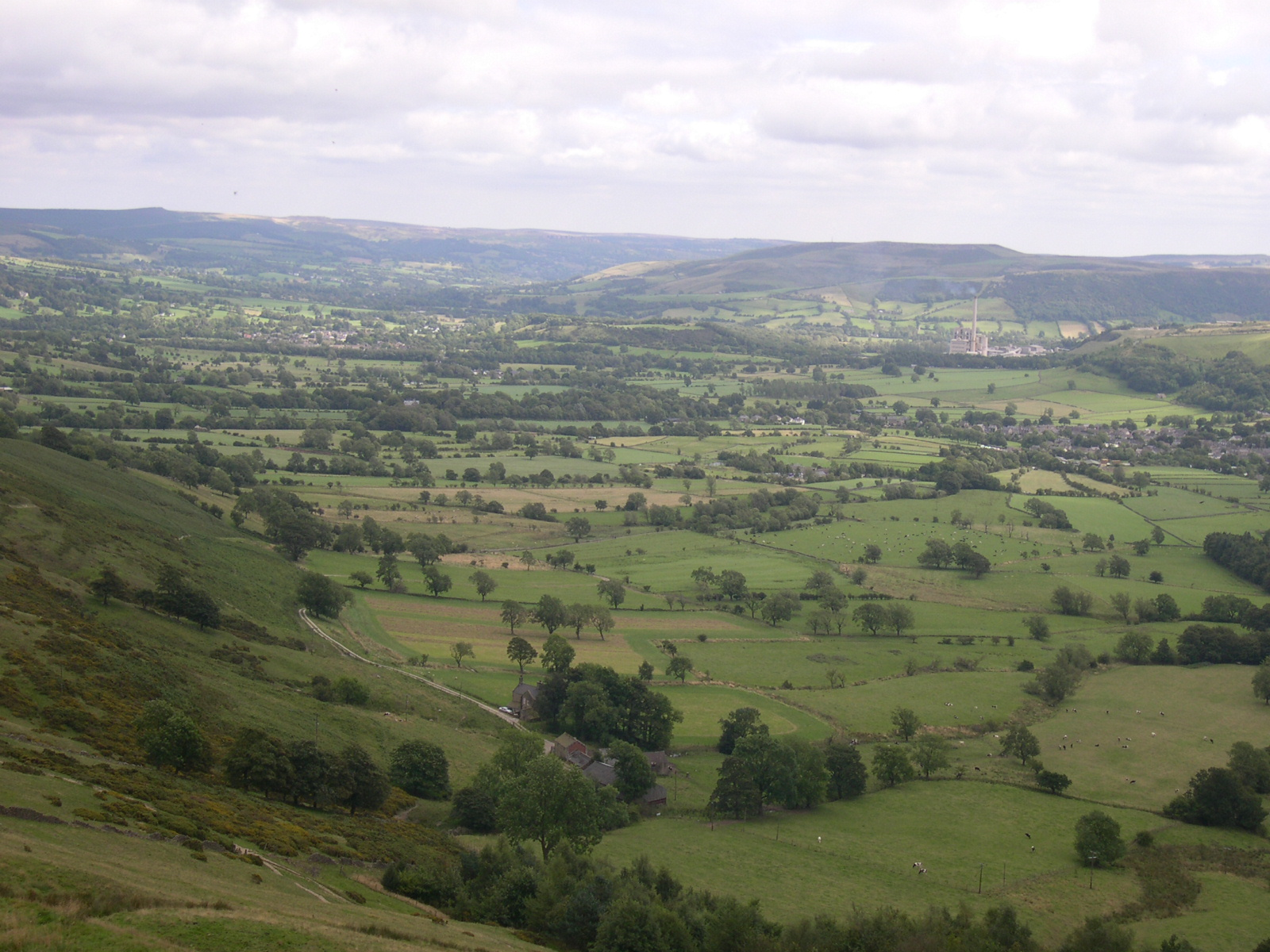
View of the Hope Valley

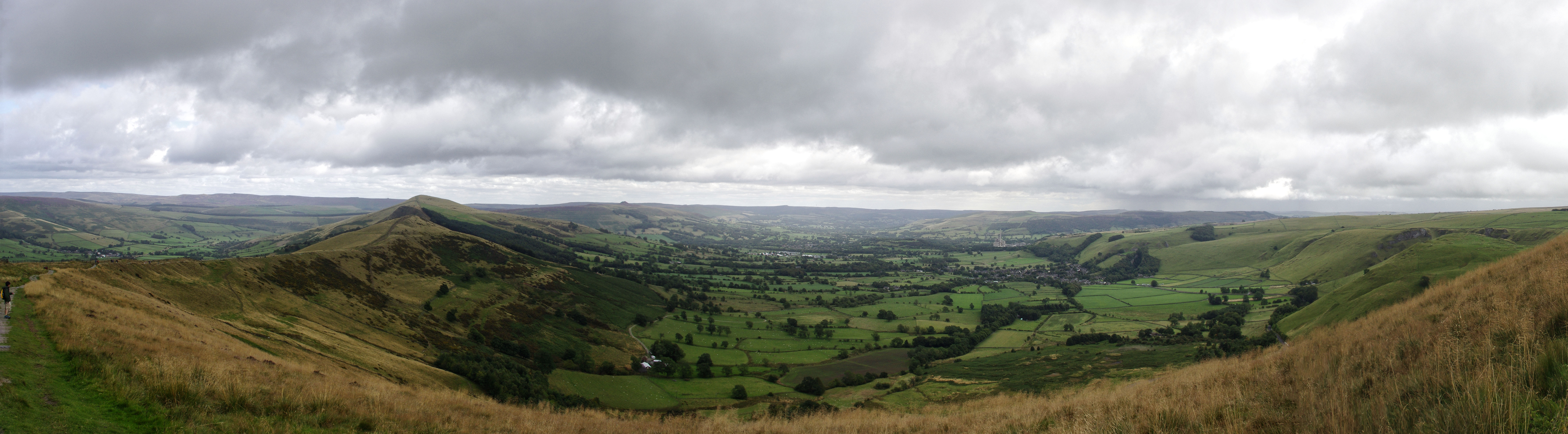
Panoramic view of the Hope Valley and Castleton

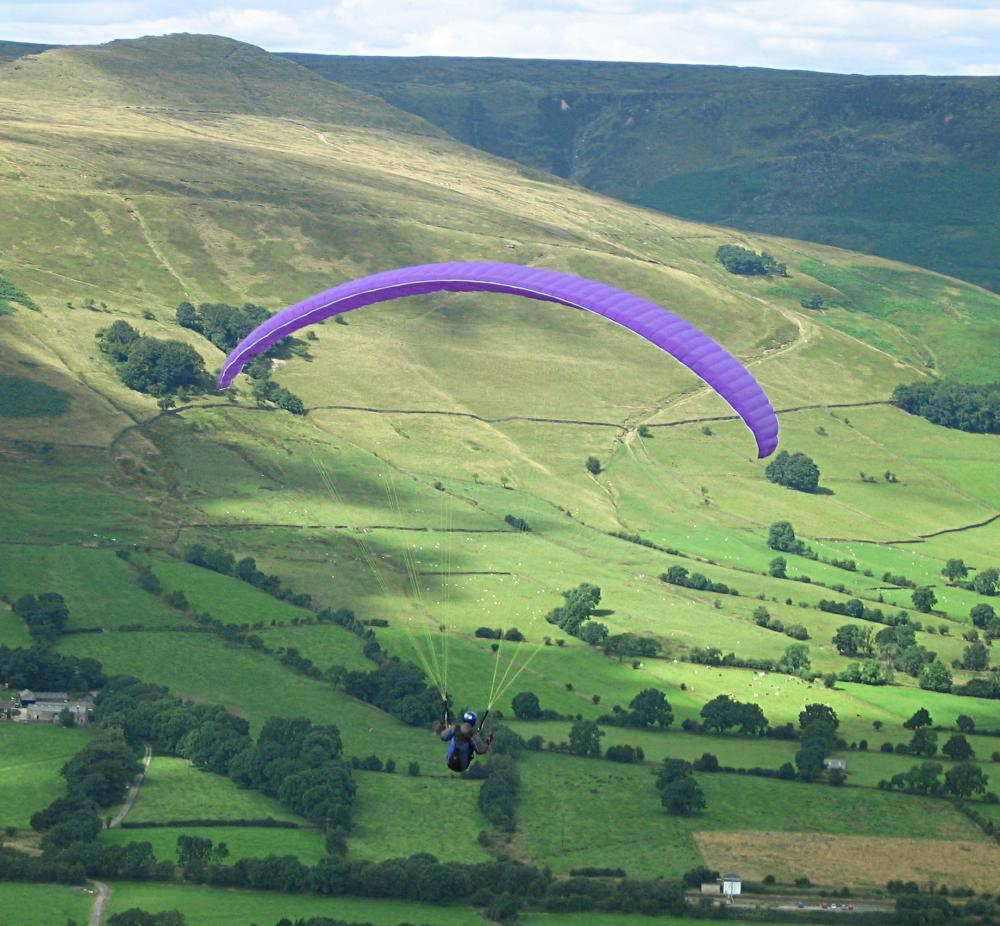
Paragliding from Mam Tor

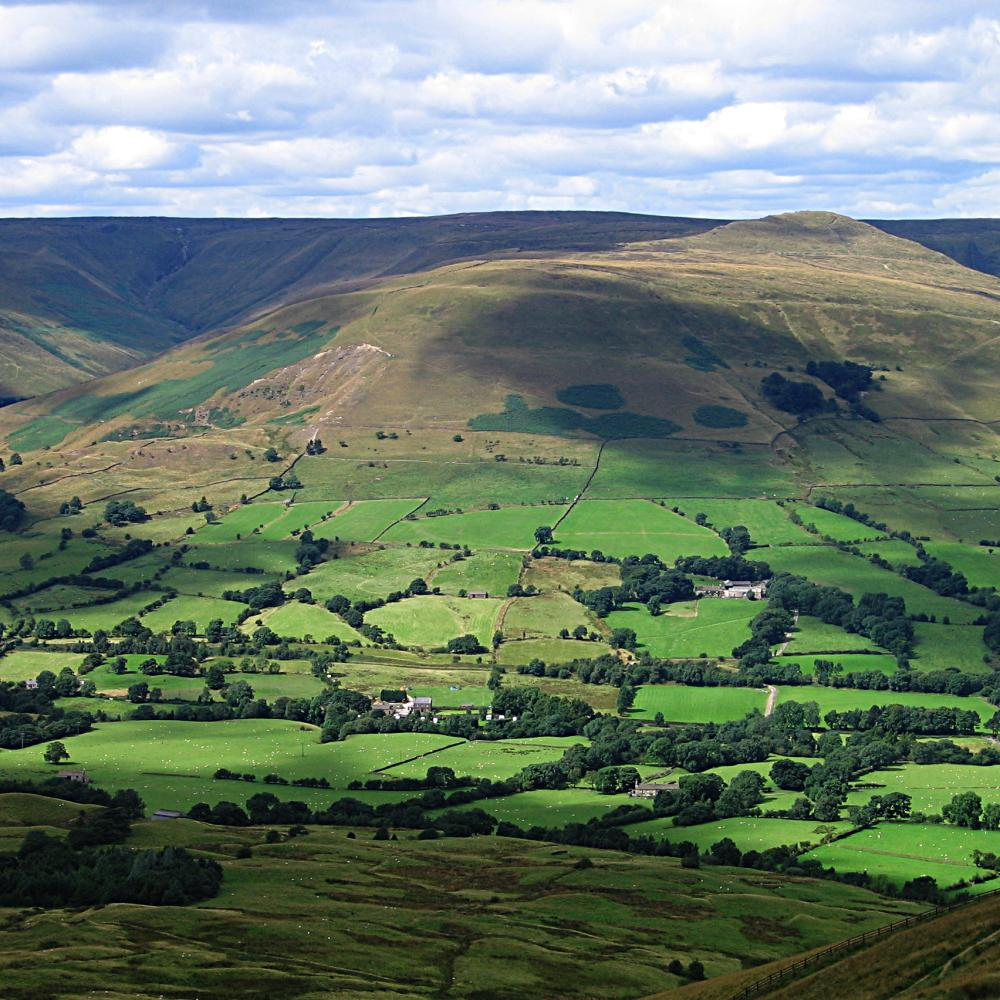
View from Mam Tor looking north towards the Vale of Edale

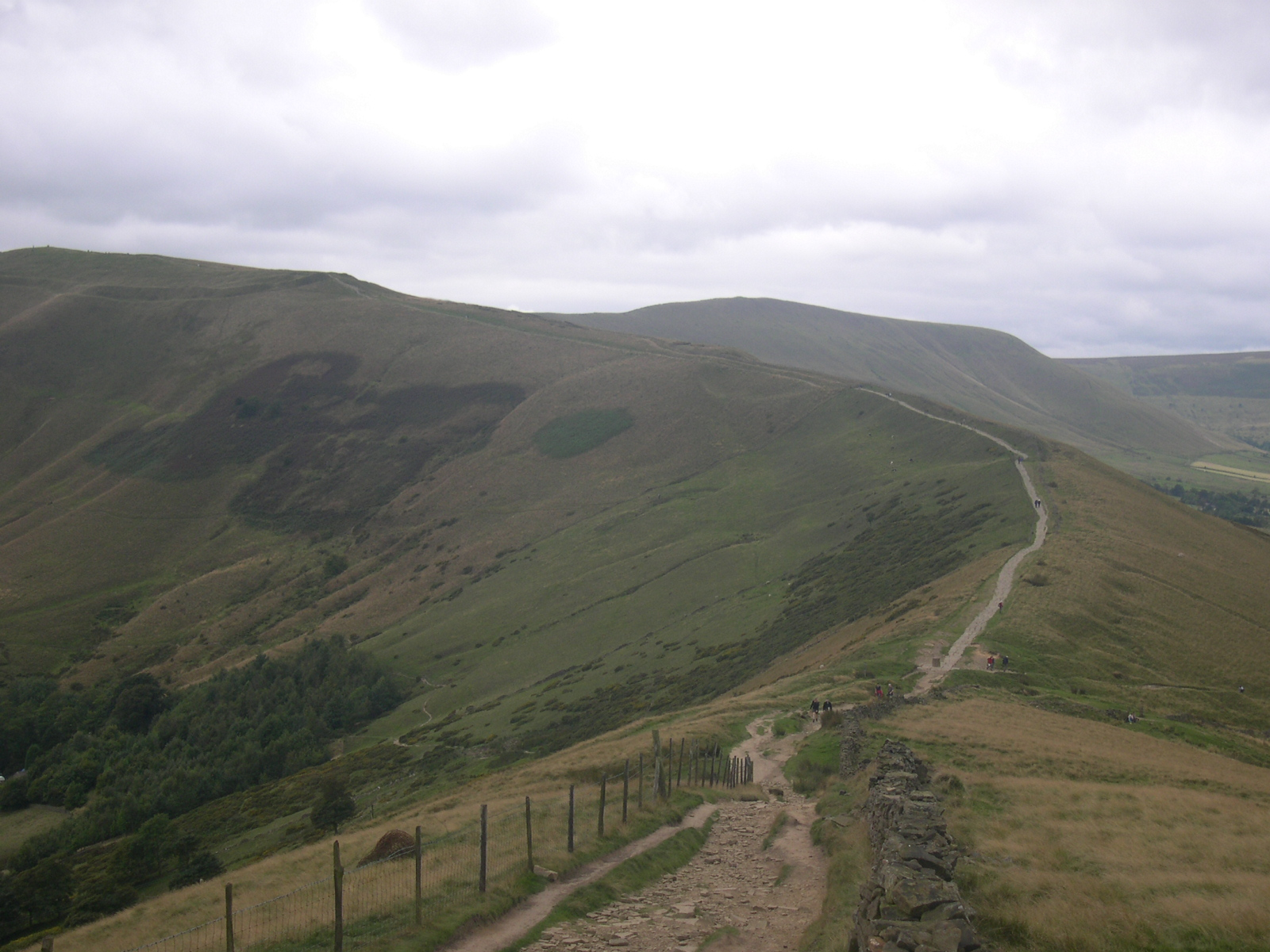
Path leading to Mam Tor from Lose Hill

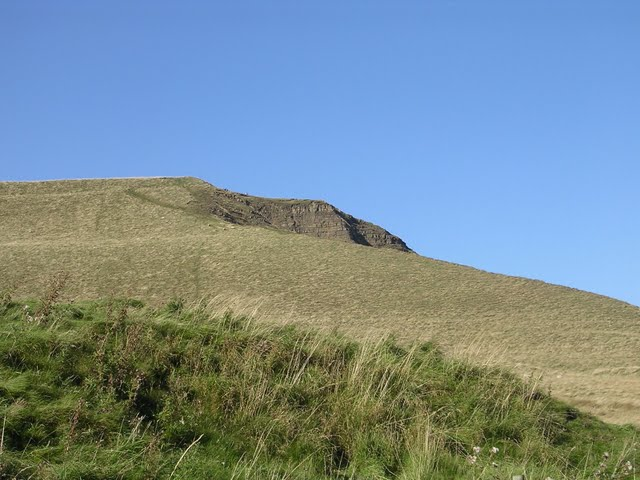
View of the summit from halfway

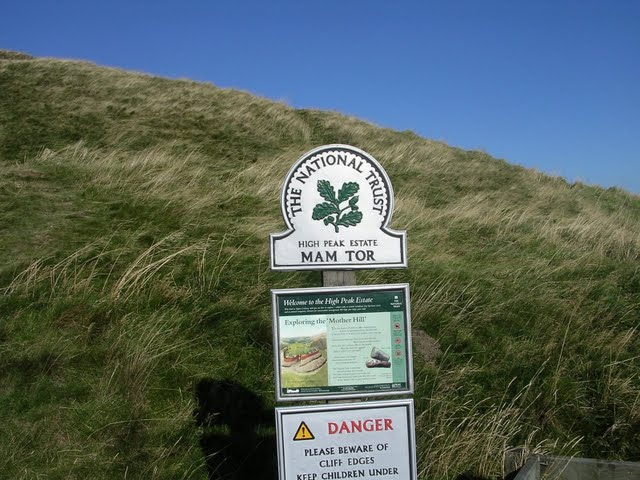
National Trust Sign

== See also ==
- Breast-shaped hill
- List of hill forts in England
- Shining Tor
