= River Noe =

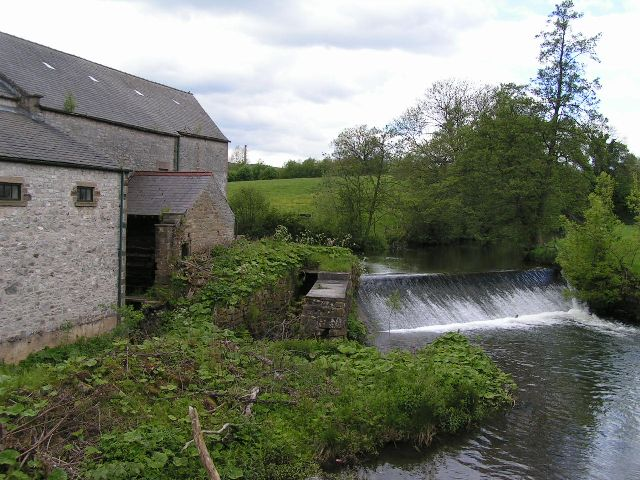
- Watermill on the River Noe, Brough-on-Noe. The waterwheel survives (just visible in the dark entrance in this picture), though it is no longer in use.

- Confluence with Derwent shown in Derbyshire

Location
- Country: England
- Counties: Derbyshire

Physical characteristics
- Source
  - location: Edale Head, Kinder Scout, Derbyshire
  - coordinates: 53.38182°N 1.87901°W
- Mouth
  - location: Bamford, Derbyshire
  - coordinates: 53.33929°N 1.69424°W
- Length: 19 km (12 mi)adjusted length
- Basin size: 73 km^{2} (28 sq mi)

Basin features
- Tributaries
  - left: Grinds Brook, Lady Booth Brook, Jaggers Clough
  - right: Whitemoor Sitch, Peakshole Water, Bradwell Brook

The River Noe is a tributary of the River Derwent in Derbyshire, England. It flows approximately 12 miles (19 km) from its source, the confluence of two streams running off Kinder Scout in the Peak District, east through Edale and then southeast through the village of Hope.

The river's source is at Edale Head from where it runs down the clough alongside Jacob's Ladder footpath and through the Vale of Edale. The river flows into the River Derwent a kilometre south of Bamford. The entire length of the river is closely followed by the Hope Valley (Manchester to Sheffield) railway line.

The portion of the river downstream of Hope, along with the valley of the River Noe's main tributary, Peakshole Water, is known as the Hope Valley.

Like many rivers in Derbyshire, the Noe was used historically to power water mills, originally these were mainly corn mills but during the industrial revolution some were rebuilt for other uses.

One example of this was the cotton mill at Edale; built in the late 18th century it shares a common design with other mills of the period, including multiple floors with large windows and a shallow pitched roof. There was also a corn and saw mill at Hope, driven by an 11 ft water wheel.

At Brough there were a number of mills that used the Noe, including a lace-thread doubling mill, a cotton mill and the corn mill (pictured). The corn mill is notable in that water-powered milling came to an end in 1954, when the flow of the Noe was reduced by the upstream diversion scheme. This was constructed to provide additional inflows for Ladybower Reservoir by the Derwent Valley Water Board.

The Romans established Navio fort overlooking a tight bend on the River Noe at Brough, which means fort in Old English.

== See also ==
- List of rivers in the Peak District
- Rivers of the United Kingdom
