= Hollins Cross =

Coordinates: 53°21′25″N 1°47′49″W

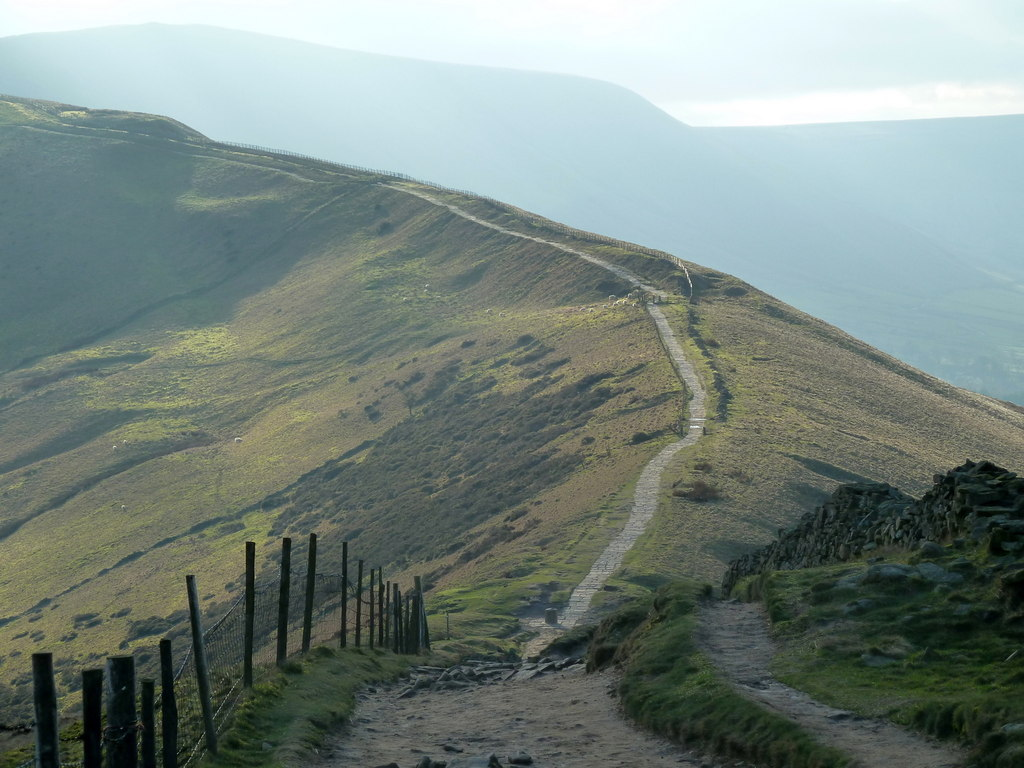
Hollins Cross from the east, looking towards Mam Tor

Hollins Cross lies between Mam Tor and Lose Hill on the Great Ridge that separates Castleton and Edale in Derbyshire, England.

Hollins Cross is the lowest point on the ridge and is therefore a popular route taken by walkers wishing either to cross from one side to the other, or to start a walk along the ridge. It was also the traditional route from Castleton to Edale. Coffins from Edale were taken over Hollins Cross to Hope church until a church was constructed in Edale, leading to the nickname of the "coffin road" for this route.

There are three well-used paths on both sides of the ridge leading to Hollins Cross. The path west of Hollins Cross is a gentle climb on a paved path of around one kilometre to the summit of Mam Tor. The path east is slightly more taxing with the initial climb up Back Tor being unpaved and badly eroded. Beyond Back Tor the path continues on to Lose Hill on a paved surface.

Hollins Cross is named for an actual cross that was raised here, but which had disappeared by 1905. A memorial to Tom Hyett (formerly surmounted by a topograph) was erected by the Long Eaton and District Group of the Ramblers Association in 1964.
