= List of parks and open spaces in Derbyshire =

List of parks in Derbyshire, England

This is a partial list of parks and open spaces in the county of Derbyshire in England. It includes urban parks, country parks, woodlands, commons, lakes, local nature reserves and other green spaces that are open to the public.

== Parks and open spaces in Derbyshire ==
Name	Image	Location	Type	Notes	Refs
Alfreton Park		Alfreton	Urban park		
Allestree Park		Derby	Urban park	Largest city park in Derby. 18th century origins. Largest Local Nature Reserve in Derbyshire.	
Alvaston Park		Derby	Urban park	Riverside park of 85 acres, opened in 1913.	
Ashbourne Recreation Ground		Ashbourne	Urban park		
Ashwood Park		Buxton	Urban park	The public park runs along the side of the River Wye and has a bowling green, two public tennis courts, a children's playground and a multi-use games area. The park was laid out in the 1920s.	
Aston-on-Trent Brickyard Plantation		Aston-on-Trent	Woodland		
Bakewell Recreation Ground		Bakewell	Urban park		
Bankswood Park		Glossop	Urban park	In Hadfield district	
Bath Gardens		Bakewell	Gardens		
Belper Parks		Belper	Urban park and nature reserve	Originally part of the medieval Royal Forest of Duffield Frith	
Belper River Gardens		Belper	Urban park		
Bluebell Wood		Hayfield	Nature reserve		
Buxton Country Park and Grin Woods		Buxton	Country park and woodland	Buxton Country Park is operated by Buxton Civic Association and the park has 100 acres of mature woodland, with a network of woodland trails including a path leading to Solomon's Temple at the summit of Grin Low hill. The country park has a 'Go Ape!' tree-top adventure course with zip wires. In 1820 the 6th Duke of Devonshire commissioned the 'Grin Plantation' to shield the scarred lime-burning landscape from visitors to the spa town.	
Calke Abbey		Ticknall	Park and formal gardens	National Trust estate and deer park. One of four National Nature Reserves in Derbyshire, covering 79.7 hectares (197 acres).	
Carsington Water		Ashbourne	Country park	Walking and cycling trails around the reservoir	
Chaddesden Park		Derby	Urban park		
Chatsworth Estate		Bakewell	Park and formal gardens	1000 acres of parkland by the River Derwent designed by Lancelot 'Capability' Brown in the 1760s. 105 acres of gardens.	
Corbar Woods		Buxton	Woodland	8.7 hectares (21 acres) on Corbar Hill managed by Buxton Civic Association.	
Cote Heath Park		Buxton	Urban park	The public park has a football pitch, a bowling green, a skate park, a multi-use games area and a children's playground	
Cotes Park and Pennytown Plantations		Alfreton	Woodland		
Cray's Hill Queen Elizabeth Park		Swanwick	Urban park		
Crossley Park		Ripley	Urban park	Crossley family donated it to Ripley town in 1901	
Darley Park		Derby	Urban park	Opened in 1931	
Derby Arboretum		Derby	Urban park	Grade II* listed historic park, opened in 1840	
Derwent Gardens		Matlock Bath	Urban park		
Elvaston Castle		Elvaston	Country park	Operated by Derbyshire County Council with public access since 1970. 321 acres of parkland, woodland and formal gardens.	
Eureka Park		Swadlincote	Urban park	Recreation ground since the 1920s	
Frith Wood		Dronfield	Woodland		
Gadley Woods		Buxton	Woodland	2.8 hectares (6.9 acres) managed by Buxton Civic Association.	
Hall Leys Park		Matlock	Urban Park		
Hardwick Hall		Chesterfield	Park and formal gardens	National Trust estate	
Heanor Memorial Park		Heanor	Urban park	Opened in 1951	
Heights of Abraham		Matlock Bath	Urban park	Grade II* listed historic hilltop park with two large caverns. Privately run with admission charge.	
Hogshaw Woods		Buxton		1.1 hectares (2.7 acres) managed by Buxton Civic Association.	
Holmewood Woodlands		Holmewood	Woodland		
Howard Park		Glossop	Urban park		
Kedleston Hall		Derby	Park and formal gardens	National Trust estate with 800 acres of parkland	
Lovers' Walks		Matlock Bath	Urban park	Dates back to the 1740s	
Manners Plantations		Ilkeston	Woodland		
Manor Park		Glossop	Urban park		
Markeaton Park		Derby	Urban park	207 acres, opened in 1931.	
Maurice Lea Memorial Park		Swadlincote	Urban park	Gifted to the town by Herbert Lea, in memory of his son Maurice who was killed in World War I. It was created in 1930 and was restored in 2005.	
Memorial Park		Whaley Bridge	Urban park		
Newhall Park		Swadlincote	Urban park		
Normanton Park		Derby	Urban park	Opened in 1909.	
Pavilion Gardens		Buxton	Urban park	The 23-acre site is a Grade II* listed historic park, landscaped in 1871 by Edward Milner and earlier by Joseph Paxton. Two tributaries of the River Wye run through is with ornamental cascades. The park has a boating lake, 2 other lakes, playgrounds, a miniature railway, a bandstand and a cafe in the Victorian pavilion. There is also a swimming pool and car park.	
Peak District		High Peak and Derbyshire Dales	National park	Established in 1951 as the UK's first national park, covering hundreds of square miles of gritstone moorlands and ridges and limestone hills and dales.	
Poolsbrook Country Park		Chesterfield	Country Park	165 acres of woodland, meadows, lakes and wildlife habitats.	
Queen's Park		Chesterfield	Urban park	Grade II* listed historic park, opened in 1887.	
Riddings Wood		Riddings	Woodland		
Serpentine Walks		Buxton	Urban park	Grade II* listed historic park alongside the River Wye, landscaped in the 1830s by Joseph Paxton.	
Shaw Wood		Oakerthorpe	Woodland		
Sherbrook Wood		Buxton	Woodland	3 acres of woodland managed by the Buxton Civic Association and the southern section is owned by Derbyshire County Council.	
Shipley Country Park		Shipley	Country park	Operated by Derbyshire County Council with public access since 1976. 700 acres of parkland and woodland.	
Sinfin Moor Park and Nature Reserve		Derby	Urban park		
Sleet Moor Wood and Colliery Plantation		Swanwick	Woodland		
Somercotes Park		Somercotes	Urban park		
The Slopes		Buxton	Urban park	Grade II listed public park, laid out by landscape architect Jeffry Wyatville in 1811 opposite The Crescent. The town's war memorial and weather station are location on The Slopes.	
Victoria Park		Ilkeston	Urban park		
West Park		Long Eaton	Urban park		

== See also ==
- List of public art in Derbyshire
- List of Sites of Special Scientific Interest in Derbyshire
- Derbyshire Wildlife Trust - List of nature reserves
- Recreational walks in Derbyshire
