= Corbar Hill =

Hill in the Peak District in Derbyshire, England

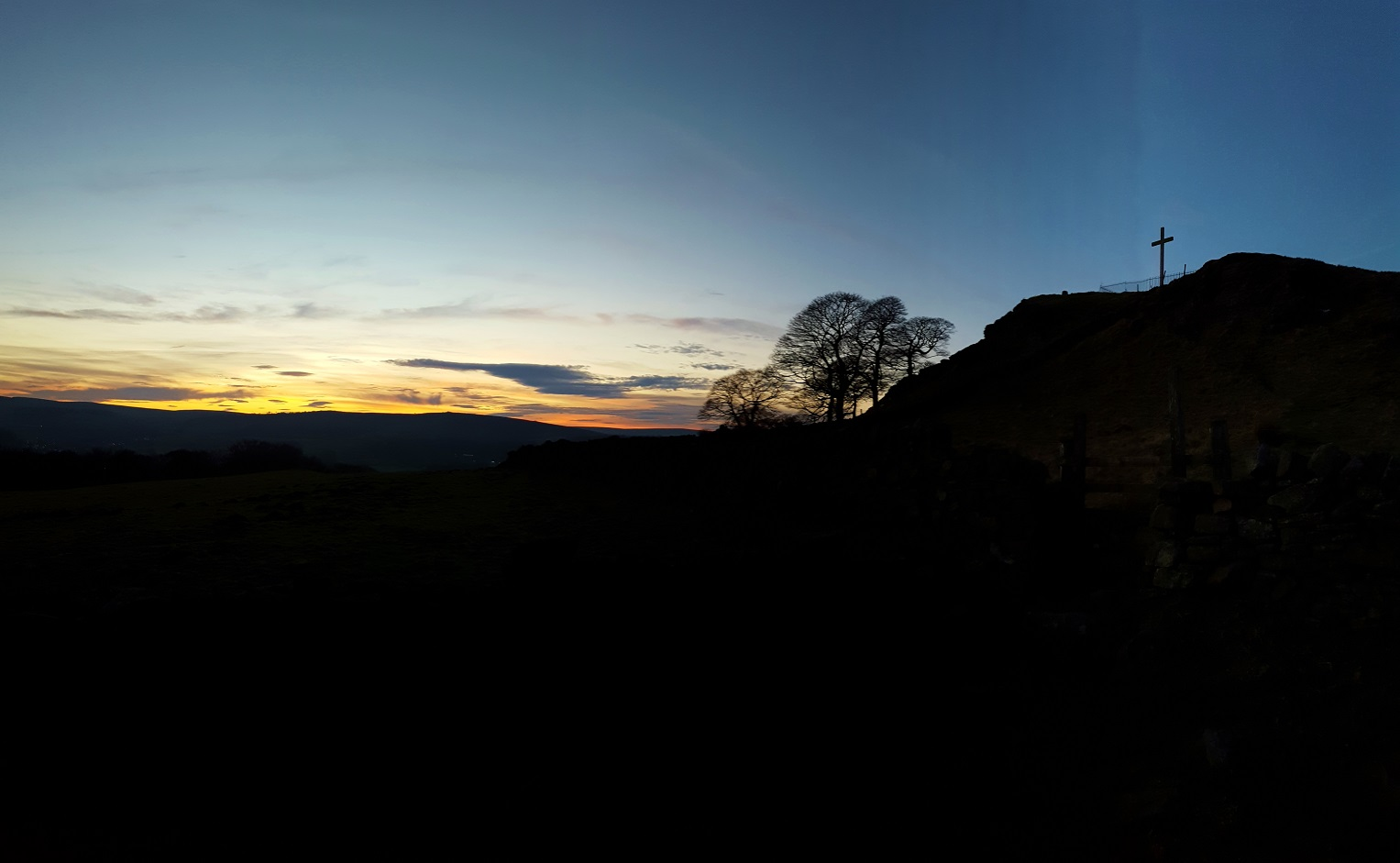
- Corbar Hill at dusk

Highest point
- Elevation: 437 metres (1,434 ft)
- Coordinates: 53°15′57″N 1°55′28″W

Geography
- Location: Peak District, England
- OS grid: SK 051743
- Topo map: OS Explorer OL24

Corbar Hill is a sandstone hill at the south end of Combs Moss, overlooking Buxton in Derbyshire, in the Peak District. The summit (marked by a trig pillar) is 437 metres (1,434 ft) above sea level.

The north west side of the hill (and most of Combs Moss and Black Edge) is designated as "open access" land for the public, following the Countryside and Rights of Way Act 2000.

Corbar Cross was a gift from the Duke of Devonshire to Buxton Catholics, who erected it at the summit in 1950 to mark the Holy Year declared by Pope Pius XII. The cross was painted pink as a prank in the 1990s. Protesters against Pope Benedict XVI's visit to the UK in 2010 cut down the cross. A replacement 6-metre-high (20 ft) solid oak cross was donated by a firm in Lancashire and installed in 2011.

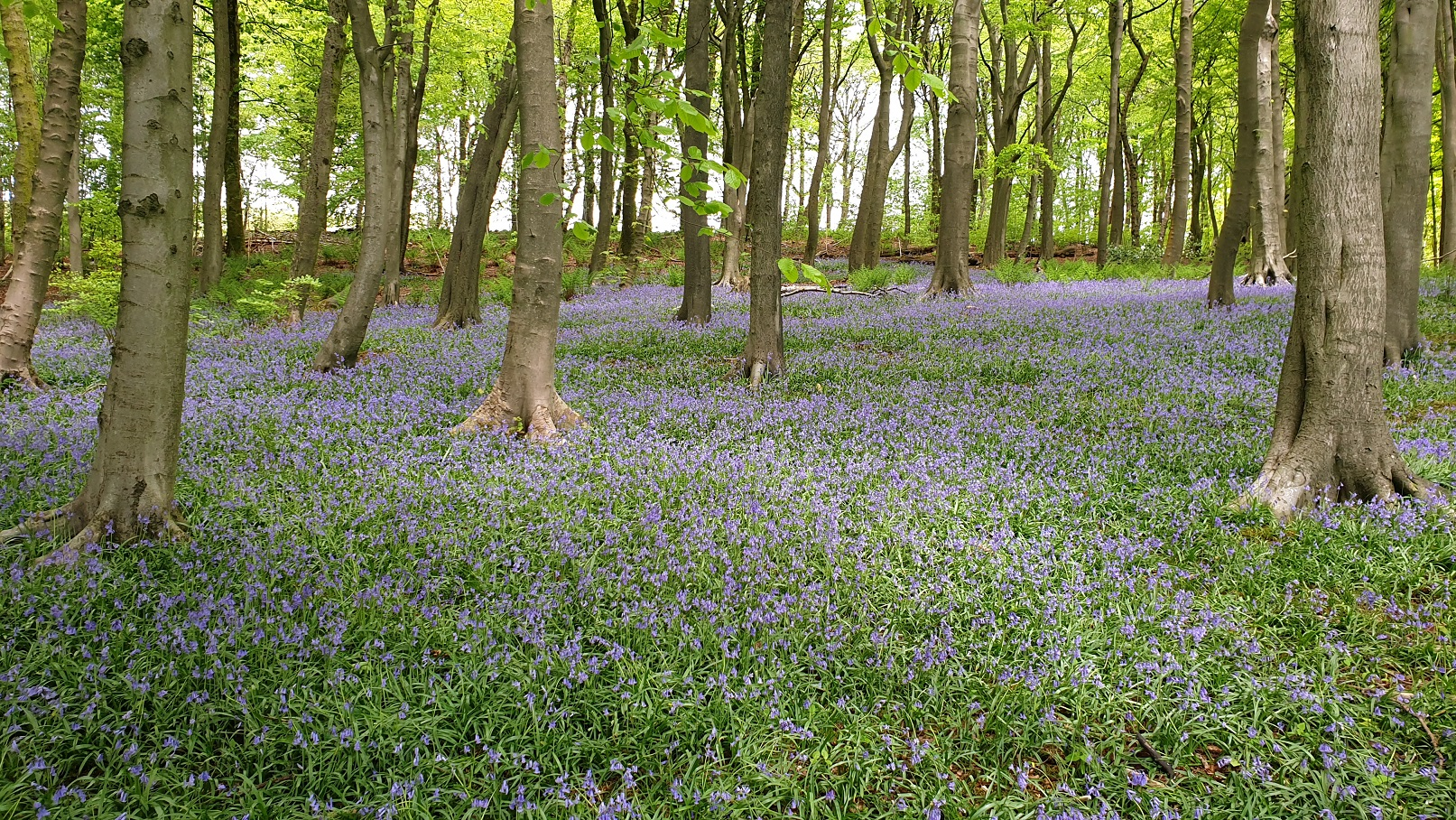
Bluebells in Corbar Woods

Corbar Woods is Buxton's oldest woodland and is included in Buxton's "The Park" conservation area. Its 54 acres are owned and managed by the Buxton Civic Association. The woods were used for coppicing trees in medieval times. There are remains of a white coal pit, which used dried coppice branches to generate the high temperatures needed to smelt lead. The 19th-century paths through the ancient woods, known as the Victorian Swiss Walks, were designed by Joseph Paxton (who also laid out the original Buxton Pavilion Gardens). These paths allowed visitors to the spa town to enjoy views over Buxton's fine buildings from the hilltop. The "Ring of Trees" waymarked walk around Buxton runs through Corbar Wood. The main tree species are beech, yew and oak. The woodland floor at the higher west end of the woods is covered with swathes of bluebells each May. The woods are habitat to common birds (such as thrushes, tits and finches) but are also home to nuthatches and woodpeckers.

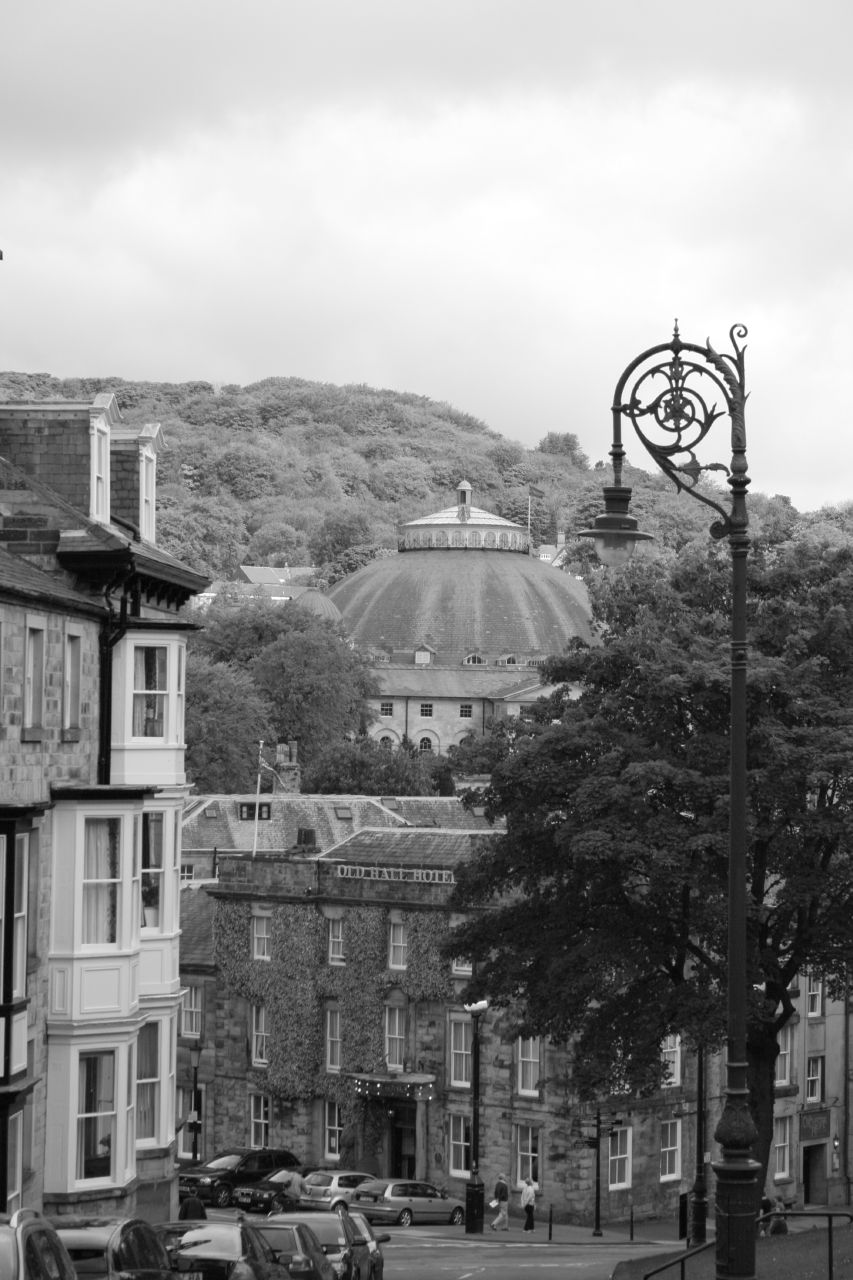
View of Corbar Hill from Buxton

Corbar Hill House (on Corbar Road in Buxton) is a Grade II listed building. It was built in the 19th century in the style of a French château (with a mansard roof and fountain), apparently for the Ryder family. It later became John Duncan School, which closed in 2003. It has now been converted into private apartments. Corbar Hill Hydro was converted from the Clarendon guest house in the 1890s to offer hydropathic treatments. It was sold in the 1930s for nurses' accommodation.

Nithen Quarry on Corbar Hill was used for many years as a source of high quality sandstone for the buildings of Buxton, including the town hall, which was built in the 1890s.
