= List of public art in Derbyshire =

This is a partial list of public art in the Derbyshire county of England. This list applies only to works of public art on permanent display in an outdoor public space. For example, this does not include artworks in museums.

== Alfreton ==
Image	Title / subject	Location and coordinates	Date	Artist / designer	Type	Material	Dimensions	Designation	Owner / administrator	Notes
	War memorial	Market Place 53.097336°N 1.390496°W	1927	William Aumonier Jnr	War memorial	Bronze statue on limestone pedestal	c.3.5m high	Grade II listed	Amber Valley Borough Council	Unveiled by General Sir Horace Smith-Dorrien, commanding officer of the Sherwood Foresters (Nottinghamshire and Derbyshire Regiment).

== Ashbourne ==
Image	Title / subject	Location and coordinates	Date	Artist / designer	Type	Material	Dimensions	Designation	Owner / administrator	Notes
	Shrovetide Hug	Henmore Meadows, Ashbourne 53.444251°N 1.948485°W	2008	Neil Hawksworth	Statue	Steel	4.6m high			Abstract statue of three players fighting for the ball during the traditional annual Shrovetide football game.
	Stones Island	Carsington Water near Ashbourne 53.0600354°N 1.6409255°W	1991	Lewis Knight	Sculpture	Gritstone			Severn Trent Water	Designed in the tradition of Derbyshire hill-top monuments.

== Belper ==
Image	Title / subject	Location and coordinates	Date	Artist / designer	Type	Material	Dimensions	Designation	Owner / administrator	Notes
	Flying Geese	A6 roundabout by Morrisons 53.020740°N 1.48539°W	2000	Paul Margetts	Sculpture	Steel	5m high		Belper Town Council	Inspired by the birds on the River Derwent
	Sacrifice	Belper Memorial Gardens 53.023109°N 1.482485°W	2019	Andy Mayers	Sculpture	Steel			Belper Town Council	The design is of the face of Jim Green, one of 14 Belper soldiers killed on the first day of the Battle of the Somme

== Bolsover ==
Image	Title / subject	Location and coordinates	Date	Artist / designer	Type	Material	Dimensions	Designation	Owner / administrator	Notes
	Venus	Bolsover Castle 53.230648°N 1.296048°W	17th century		Statue	Stone			English Heritage	The main figure of the Venus fountain. Restored in 1999.

== Buxton ==
Image	Title / subject	Location and coordinates	Date	Artist / designer	Type	Material	Dimensions	Designation	Owner / administrator	Notes
	St Ann's Well	The Crescent 53.2588°N 1.9143°W	1940	The bronze statue of St Ann and child is by Palliser	Water fountain	Bronze figures and ashlar gritstone	c.3m high	Grade II listed	High Peak Borough Council	Inscriptions: A WELL OF LIVING WATERS; A TRIBUTE TO THE MEMORY OF EMELIE DOROTHY BOUNDS COUNCILLOR OF THIS BOROUGH
	William Cavendish, 5th Duke of Devonshire	George Street 53.258609°N 1.915906°W	2020	Denise Dutton	Statue	Bronze	2.3m high		High Peak Borough Council	Sponsor of The Crescent in the 1780s. Statue was erected to commemorate the completion of the refurbishment and reopening of the Crescent Hotel in 2020. Statue's benefactors: Bill and Sheila Barratt
More images	Winged Victory War memorial	The Slopes 53.258257°N 1.913767°W	1920	Louis Frederick Roslyn	War memorial	Ashlar obelisk with bronze statue	c.8m high	Grade II listed	High Peak Borough Council	Inscription: PRO PATRIA; 1914 + 1918; 1939 + 1945

== Castleton ==
Image	Title / subject	Location and coordinates	Date	Artist / designer	Type	Material	Dimensions	Designation	Owner / administrator	Notes
	Bow and Arrow	Visitor Centre on Buxton Road 53.343110°N 1.777700°W	2004		Sculpture	Steel			Peak District National Park Authority	Pointing to Peveril Castle

== Chesterfield ==
Image	Title / subject	Location and coordinates	Date	Artist / designer	Type	Material	Dimensions	Designation	Owner / administrator	Notes
	Apple	Between Chesterfield F.C.'s ground and Tesco 53.252544°N 1.425170°W	2011	Michael Johnson	Sculpture	Steel and bronze	5m high		Chesterfield Borough Council	The design reflects new growth, health and well-being. The bronze inlays are inspired by the town's origins, industries and communities.
	George Stephenson	Chesterfield railway station 53.23828°N 1.42015°W	2005	Stephen Hicklin	Statue	Bronze	c.2m tall		Chesterfield Borough Council	Inscribed on the base: "Discovery, Vision and Invention" in the centre, and "George Stephenson 1781-1848. Locomotion, the conquest over space and time" around the outside.
	Growth	Hornsbridge roundabout 53.23077°N 1.42368°W	2014	Melanie Jackson	Sculpture	Steel	c.8m tall and c.8m wide		Chesterfield Borough Council	Designed around the flower of the pomegranate tree (from the town's coat of arms) and the twisted form of the petals inspired by the town's twisted spire.
	James Haslam MP	Outside the former NUM offices in Saltergate 53.237767°N 1.436408°W	1915		Statue	Stone		Grade II listed	Chesterfield Borough Council	Inscription: "Erected by the Derbyshire Miners Association in memory of James Haslam MP. One of the founders of the association and its General Secretary from 1881 to 1913"
	Mollusc	Site of the former Markham & Co. works 53.237036°N 1.417571°W	2003	Liz Lemon	Sculpture	Stainless steel	c.5m high x c.8m wide			Design inspired by ammonite fossil and the shape of casings of the huge water-turbines once made at the Markham works.
	Poise (Wind Sculpture)	West Bars 53.234837°N 1.432518°W	2002	Angela Conner	Sculpture	White onyx-marble dust and resin	c.2.6m high and wide		Royal Mail	The disc is made up of six segments, which move freely in the wind.
	Rosewall Curved Reclining Form	Future Walk, West Bars 53.235093°N 1.434965°W	1960–62	Dame Barbara Hepworth	Sculpture	Nebrasina limestone	c.1m high and 2.3m wide	Grade II listed	Chesterfield Borough Council	Brought to Chesterfield in 1963 by the GPO (later Royal Mail). Bought by the town council in 2009 and moved onto a rectangular plinth set in a shallow tiled pool.
	A System of Support and Balance	Outside the Chesterfield Magistrates Court 53.237637°N 1.424081°W	2004	Paul Lewthwaite	Sculpture	Steel and concrete	6.6m high		Chesterfield Borough Council	Inspired by the archways and columns around the town centre, on a base of piled books.
	Walking Together	Site of the former Markham Colliery at Staveley 53.241933°N 1.335663°W	2013	Stephen Broadbent	Memorial	Steel				Tribute to 106 miners who died in mining disasters at Markham Colliery in 1937, 1938 and 1973.
	William Harvey MP	Outside the former NUM offices in Saltergate 53.237767°N 1.436408°W	1915		Statue	Stone		Grade II listed	Chesterfield Borough Council	Inscription: "Erected by the Derbyshire Miners Association in memory of William Edward Harvey MP one of the founders of the association and an official from 1883 to 1914"

== Derby ==
Image	Title / subject	Location and coordinates	Date	Artist / designer	Type	Material	Dimensions	Designation	Owner / administrator	Notes
	Bonnie Prince Charlie	Cathedral Green 52.925067°N 1.476244°W	1995	Anthony Stones	Statue	Bronze figure on a sandstone ashlar pedestal and base	c.4.5m high		Derby City Council	Prince Charles Edward Stuart on horseback. Erected in 1995 to mark the 250th Anniversary of the Prince's occupation of Derby.
	"Boy and Goose"	Sir Peter Hilton Memorial Garden 52.922972°N 1.475180°W	1926	Alexander Fisher	Sculpture	Bronze				Originally known as "Boy and Gander" and in a fountain in the Market Place; moved to River Gardens in 1933; Council House from 1949; in store from 1971; restored 1977 then inside New Assembly Rooms, current location from 1996.
	"Boy and Ram"	River Gardens 52.922874°N 1.472568°W	1963	Wilfred Edgar Dudeney	Sculpture	Bronze on granite base				First installed in 1963 in the new Main Centre shopping precinct. Moved in 2005 to make way for the construction of Westfield.
More images	Brian Clough and Peter Taylor	Unity Plaza, Pride Park Stadium 52.915189°N 1.449661°W	2008	Andrew Edwards	Statue	Bronze	9 feet (2.7 m) (height)		Derby County Football Club	Clough and Taylor are shown holding the League Championship trophy which they won while managing Derby County F.C. in 1972. Unveiled on 27 August 2010.
	"The Derby Ram"	East Street and Albion Street 52.921290°N 1.474300°W	1995	Michael Pegler	Sculpture	Millstone grit	2m x 2.4 cm x 1.7m			Inspired by the ancient ballad about the mythical creature The Derby Ram.
	Derby War Memorial	Market Place 52.923499°N 1.476458°W	1923	Arthur George Walker	War Memorial	Bronze figure on a sandstone pedestal	c.4m high		Derby City Council	Erected in 1923 opposite the Guildhall.
	Florence Nightingale	In front of the former Derbyshire Royal Infirmary site on London Road 52.912057°N 1.470546°W	1914	Countess Feodora Gleichen	Statue	Stone	c.4.2m high	Grade II listed	Derby City Council	Inscription: "FIAT LVX" meaning let there be light.
	"Florentine Boar"	Derby Arboretum 52.914540°N 1.472900°W	2005	Alex Paxton	Sculpture	Bronze on stone plinth			Derby City Council	Nicknamed Charlie by its creator. Replaced William John Coffee's original 'Florentine Boar' from 1806 and installed in the park when it was opened in 1840 but destroyed in 1941 by a World War II bomb.
	Sir Henry Royce	Riverside Gardens 52.887628°N 1.463034°W	1921	Derwent Wood	Statue	Bronze on a stone plinth		Grade II listed	Derby City Council	Moved from Derby Arboretum in 1972.
	Michael Thomas Bass	Wardwick 52.922933°N 1.480508°W	1885	Joseph Edgar Boehm	Statue	Bronze		Grade II listed	Derby City Council	Inscription: "Michael Thomas Bass MP for Derby 1848 to 1888"
	Queen Victoria	Former Derbyshire Royal Infirmary site on London Road 52.9155306°N 1.468056°W	1906	Charles Bell Birch	Statue	Bronze on a granite pedestal		Grade II listed	Derby City Council	Unveiled by King Edward VII in 1906.

== Glossop ==
Image	Title / subject	Location and coordinates	Date	Artist / designer	Type	Material	Dimensions	Designation	Owner / administrator	Notes
	Glossop Cenotaph	Norfolk Square 53.4434156°N 1.9501061°W	1921	Vernon March	War memorial	Bronze statue on sandstone pedestal	c.5m high	Grade II listed	High Peak Borough Council	Winged Victory figure. Unveiled by Fracis Edward, Lord Howard in 1922.
	Howard Lion	Glossop railway station 53.444251°N 1.948485°W	1847		Statue	Stone				The Howard Lion (named after Lord Howard) stands above Glossop Central station, designed by Hadfield and Weightman, completed in 1847.

== Matlock Bath ==
Image	Title / subject	Location and coordinates	Date	Artist / designer	Type	Material	Dimensions	Designation	Owner / administrator	Notes
More images	War Memorial	North Parade 53.121700°N 1.559565°W	1921		War memorial				Derbyshire Dales District Council	The war memorial was unveiled on 21 May 1921
	Sir Richard Arkwright	Masson Mills Shopping Village 53.112840°N 1.561829°W			Statue	Bronze			Masson Mills Shopping Village	

== Swadlincote ==
Image	Title / subject	Location and coordinates	Date	Artist / designer	Type	Material	Dimensions	Designation	Owner / administrator	Notes
	Don't Worry Son	Town centre DE11 9FQ 52.771659°N 1.555527°W	2011	Ray Londsdale	Sculpture	Steel				Inscription of miner's words: Don't worry son, it's just a hole in the ground where you'll find your roots.
