= 2023 High Peak Borough Council election =

2023 UK local government election

- 4 May 2023

All 43 seats to High Peak Borough Council 22 seats needed for a majority
- Turnout: 39.5%

	First party	Second party	Third party
Leader	Anthony McKeown	Tony Ashton	Joanna Collins
Party	Labour	Conservative	Green
Leader's seat	Gamesley	Sett	Hope Valley
Last election	22 seats, 34.9%	16 seats, 33.2%	2 seats, 15.1%
Seats before	19	16	2
Seats after	29	10	2
Seat change	+10	-6	-
	Fourth party	Fifth party	Sixth party
Leader	David Lomax
Party	Liberal Democrats	Independent	Vacant
Leader's seat	Whaley Bridge
Last election	3 seats, 14.9%	0 seats, 0.8%
Seats before	3	1	2
Seats after	1	1
Seat change	-2	-
- Results by ward
Leader before election
Anthony McKeown
Labour
No overall control
Leader after election
Anthony McKeown
Labour

The 2023 High Peak Borough Council election took place on 4 May 2023 to elect members of High Peak Borough Council in Derbyshire, England. This was on the same day as other local elections in England.

The council was under no overall control prior to the election. Labour had won a majority at the previous full council election in 2019, but lost its majority in 2022 following a by-election in Cote Heath ward. Labour regained a majority at the 2023 election, winning 29 of the 43 seats on the council.

== Summary ==
=== Election result ===
The overall results were as follows, with vote and candidate totals compiled from the declarations of result of poll for each ward:

2023 High Peak Borough Council election
Party	Candidates	Seats	Gains	Losses	Net gain/loss	Seats %	Votes %	Votes	+/−
Labour	41	29	8	1	▲7	67.4	48.3	22,999	
Conservative	43	10	1	7	▼6	23.3	32.9	15,655	
Green	23	2	0	0	Steady	4.7	9.8	4,674	
Liberal Democrats	13	1	0	2	▼2	2.3	7.4	3,499	
Independent	1	1	1	0	▲1	2.3	1.4	677	
Reform	1	0	0	0	Steady	0	0.2	78	

== Ward results ==
The Statement of Persons Nominated, which details the candidates standing in each ward, was released by High Peak Borough Council following the close of nominations on 5 April 2023.

Incumbent councillors are marked with an asterisk. The results for each ward were:

=== Barms ===
Barms
Party	Candidate	Votes	%	±%
Labour	Rachael Quinn*	246	53.7	+4.8
Conservative	Colin Woodhouse	166	36.2	+2.2
Green	Ben Evens	42	9.2	−7.9
Majority		80	17.5	
Rejected ballots		4	0.9	
Turnout		458	34.05	
Registered electors		1,345		
Labour hold		Swing		

=== Blackbrook ===
Blackbrook (2 seats)
Party	Candidate	Votes	%	±%
Independent	Dan Capper	677	38.1	N/A
Labour	Angela Benham	634	35.7	N/A
Labour	Penny Took	627	35.3	+5.4
Conservative	John Kappes	465	26.2	−5.8
Liberal Democrats	Edith Longden*	456	25.6	−11.9
Conservative	Mark Stafford	402	22.6	−12.6
Majority		7	0.4	
Rejected ballots		4	0.2	
Turnout		1778	49.06	
Registered electors		3,624		
Labour gain from Conservative		Swing		
Independent gain from Liberal Democrats		Swing		

=== Burbage ===
Burbage
Party	Candidate	Votes	%	±%
Labour	Chris Payne	264	44.9	+12.3
Conservative	Steve Clark	242	41.2	−2.0
Green	Samantha Flower*	80	13.6	−29.6
Majority		22	3.7	
Rejected ballots		2	0.3	
Turnout		588	37.26	
Registered electors		1,578		
Labour gain from Conservative		Swing		

=== Buxton Central ===
Buxton Central (2 seats)
Party	Candidate	Votes	%	±%
Labour	Jean Todd*	576	54.9	+1.7
Labour	Payge Hacking	573	54.6	−4.5
Conservative	Michael Hunter	324	30.9	+5.9
Conservative	Julie Butterworth	297	28.3	+7.0
Green	Lisa Adamson	219	20.9	−6.5
Majority		249	23.7	
Rejected ballots		5	0.5	
Turnout		1050	36.01	
Registered electors		2,916		
Labour hold		Swing		
Labour hold		Swing		

=== Chapel East ===
Chapel East
Party	Candidate	Votes	%	±%
Conservative	Nigel Gourlay	272	44.9	+1.7
Labour	Jim Lambert	265	43.7	+10.4
Green	Chris Williams	46	7.6	−4.7
Liberal Democrats	Jane Simm	21	3.5	−7.6
Majority		7	1.2	
Rejected ballots		1	0.2	
Turnout		606	35.88	
Registered electors		1,689		
Conservative hold		Swing		

=== Chapel West ===
Chapel West (2 seats)
Party	Candidate	Votes	%	±%
Labour	Sally De Pee	743	49.2	+23.2
Conservative	Kath Sizeland*	720	47.7	+4.0
Labour	Timmy Norton	650	43.0	+20.2
Conservative	Stewart Young*	596	39.4	+4.6
Green	Jeremy Wight	184	12.2	−1.2
Majority		70	4.6	
Rejected ballots		8	0.5	
Turnout		1511	38.9	
Registered electors		3,884		
Labour gain from Conservative		Swing		
Conservative hold		Swing		

=== Corbar ===
Corbar (2 seats)
Party	Candidate	Votes	%	±%
Labour Co-op	Madeline Hall*	569	41.0	+6.4
Conservative	Chris Morten	427	30.7	−4.7
Labour Co-op	Graham Winter	422	30.4	N/A
Green	Chris Hallam	384	27.6	−5.8
Conservative	Mark Wilson	362	26.1	−4.7
Green	Eileen Reynolds	318	22.9	N/A
Liberal Democrats	Stanley Heptinstall	114	8.2	−12.9
Reform	Melandra Smith	78	5.6	N/A
Majority		5	0.4	
Rejected ballots		1	0.1	
Turnout		1389	45.32	
Registered electors		3,065		
Labour hold		Swing		
Conservative hold		Swing		

=== Cote Heath ===
Cote Heath (2 seats)
Party	Candidate	Votes	%	±%
Conservative	Linda Grooby*	595	46.1	−1.7
Conservative	Kev Kirkham*	569	44.0	+3.2
Labour	Alan Smith	569	44.0	−3.6
Labour	Mary Dunk	537	41.6	−3.7
Green	David Busby	178	13.8	N/A
Majority		0	0.0	
Rejected ballots		5	0.4	
Turnout		1292	36.22	
Registered electors		3,567		
Conservative gain from Labour		Swing		
Conservative hold		Swing		

Kev Kirkham and Labour candidate Alan Smith tied on 569 votes for the second seat. Kirkham was elected after his name was drawn from a ballot box.

=== Dinting ===
Dinting
Party	Candidate	Votes	%	±%
Conservative	Dominic Elliott-Starkey	423	43.4	+0.1
Labour	Rachel Sloman	406	41.7	+10.2
Green	Holly McBride	78	8.0	−6.4
Liberal Democrats	Stephen Worrall	61	6.3	−4.5
Majority		17	1.7	
Rejected ballots		5	0.5	
Turnout		974	50.81	
Registered electors		1,917		
Conservative hold		Swing		

=== Gamesley ===
Gamesley
Party	Candidate	Votes	%	±%
Labour Co-op	Anthony McKeown*	205	75.4	−9.4
Conservative	Mick Reddy	39	14.3	−0.9
Green	Matthew Firth	27	9.9	N/A
Majority		166	61.0	
Rejected ballots		1	0.4	
Turnout		272	16.06	
Registered electors		1,694		
Labour hold		Swing		

=== Hadfield North ===
Hadfield North
Party	Candidate	Votes	%	±%
Labour	Gillian Cross	296	65.8	+10.1
Conservative	David Cadwell	111	24.7	+5.8
Green	Neil Best	42	9.4	−15.9
Majority		185	41.1	
Rejected ballots		1	0.2	
Turnout		450	26.36	
Registered electors		1,707		
Labour hold		Swing		

=== Hadfield South ===
Hadfield South (2 seats)
Party	Candidate	Votes	%	±%
Labour Co-op	Edward Siddall*	656	59.4	+9.9
Labour Co-op	Bob McKeown*	601	54.4	+8.3
Conservative	Julie Conlan	333	30.1	+7.3
Conservative	Tom Wynne	318	28.8	+7.2
Green	Robert Hodgetts-Haley	166	15.0	−4.3
Majority		268	24.3	
Rejected ballots		5	0.5	
Turnout		1105	33.31	
Registered electors		3,317		
Labour hold		Swing		
Labour hold		Swing		

=== Hayfield ===
Hayfield
Party	Candidate	Votes	%	±%
Labour Co-op	Gill Scott	530	59.8	+23.6
Conservative	Eva Lawson*	270	30.4	−7.2
Liberal Democrats	Sarah High	77	8.7	−6.8
Majority		260	29.3	
Rejected ballots		10	1.1	
Turnout		887	53.24	
Registered electors		1,666		
Labour gain from Conservative		Swing		

=== Hope Valley ===
Hope Valley (2 seats)
Party	Candidate	Votes	%	±%
Green	Charlotte Farrell*	812	52.7	+6.8
Green	Joanna Collins*	753	48.9	+4.9
Conservative	Fredrick Walton	557	36.1	−6.9
Conservative	Hayley Dalton	530	34.4	−7.7
Labour	David Owen	244	15.8	N/A
Majority		196	12.7	
Rejected ballots		5	0.3	
Turnout		1541	50.72	
Registered electors		3,038		
Green hold		Swing		
Green hold		Swing		

=== Howard Town ===
Howard Town (2 seats)
Party	Candidate	Votes	%	±%
Labour	Damien Greenhalgh*	892	68.8	+9.0
Labour	Godfrey Claff	819	63.1	+9.1
Green	Linda Walker	279	21.5	−6.4
Conservative	Lesley Morgan	255	19.7	+4.7
Conservative	Anne Thornley	252	19.4	+8.1
Majority		540	41.6	
Rejected ballots		4	0.3	
Turnout		1297	35.68	
Registered electors		3,635		
Labour hold		Swing		
Labour hold		Swing		

=== Limestone Peak ===
Limestone Peak
Party	Candidate	Votes	%	±%
Conservative	Peter Roberts*	352	60.6	+3.5
Labour	Caitlin Bisknell	161	27.7	+1.4
Green	Daniel Wimberley	68	11.7	−4.9
Majority		191	32.8	
Rejected ballots		2	0.3	
Turnout		583	32.53	
Registered electors		1,792		
Conservative hold		Swing		

=== New Mills East ===
New Mills East (2 seats)
Party	Candidate	Votes	%	±%
Labour	Alan Barrow*	508	56.1	+13.2
Labour	Ian Huddlestone*	506	55.9	+12.0
Liberal Democrats	Paul Adrio	258	28.5	−8.0
Liberal Democrats	Charles Jevon	206	22.8	N/A
Conservative	Sally Gibson	133	14.7	−4.7
Conservative	Ginny Priestley	122	13.5	+5.4
Majority		248	27.4	
Rejected ballots		6	0.7	
Turnout		905	29.18	
Registered electors		3,101		
Labour hold		Swing		
Labour hold		Swing		

=== New Mills West ===
New Mills West (2 seats)
Party	Candidate	Votes	%	±%
Labour	Simon Evans	737	53.2	+10.4
Labour	Jenni Benzer	673	48.6	+12.4
Liberal Democrats	Ray Atkins*	345	24.9	−12.9
Green	John Payne	250	18.1	−3.7
Liberal Democrats	Anthony Adrio	244	17.6	−4.4
Conservative	Jill Woodacre	207	14.9	+0.7
Conservative	Brian Sidebottom	193	13.9	+3.0
Majority		328	23.7	
Rejected ballots		10	0.7	
Turnout		1385	40.75	
Registered electors		3,399		
Labour gain from Liberal Democrats		Swing		
Labour hold		Swing		

=== Old Glossop ===
Old Glossop (2 seats)
Party	Candidate	Votes	%	±%
Conservative	Paul Hardy*	800	43.9	+8.7
Conservative	Adrian Hopkinson	789	43.3	+7.7
Labour	Linda Rundle	773	42.4	+9.3
Labour	Sebastian Andrews	658	36.1	+6.0
Green	Paul Bohan	360	19.8	−7.6
Majority		16	0.9	
Rejected ballots		8	0.4	
Turnout		1822	49.44	
Registered electors		3,685		
Conservative hold		Swing		
Conservative hold		Swing		

=== Padfield ===
Padfield
Party	Candidate	Votes	%	±%
Labour	Ollie Cross*	550	76.3	+30.0
Conservative	Leo Parker	126	17.5	−16.7
Green	Lucas Jones	43	6.0	−13.5
Majority		424	58.8	
Rejected ballots		2	0.3	
Turnout		721	38.83	
Registered electors		1,857		
Labour hold		Swing		

=== Sett ===
Sett
Party	Candidate	Votes	%	±%
Labour	Peter Inman	446	54.8	+17.6
Conservative	Jacky Sidebottom-Every	299	36.7	−6.2
Liberal Democrats	Rachel Barber	66	8.1	N/A
Majority		147	18.1	
Rejected ballots		3	0.4	
Turnout		814	51.52	
Registered electors		1,580		
Labour gain from Conservative		Swing		

=== Simmondley ===
Simmondley (2 seats)
Party	Candidate	Votes	%	±%
Labour	Stewart Gardner*	848	55.5	+13.7
Labour	Pam Mackie	772	50.5	N/A
Conservative	Stephen Marsden	683	44.7	+5.9
Conservative	Hector Marchetti Urena	676	44.2	+9.7
Majority		89	5.8	
Rejected ballots		8	0.5	
Turnout		1529	45.79	
Registered electors		3,339		
Labour gain from Conservative		Swing		
Labour hold		Swing		

=== St John's ===
St John's
Party	Candidate	Votes	%	±%
Labour	Pauline Bell	378	55.2	+21.6
Conservative	Ryan Elliott-Starkey	304	44.4	−8.4
Majority		74	10.8	
Rejected ballots		3	0.4	
Turnout		685	44.39	
Registered electors		1,543		
Labour gain from Conservative		Swing		

=== Stone Bench ===
Stone Bench (2 seats)
Party	Candidate	Votes	%	±%
Labour	Fiona Sloman*	484	61.0	+11.1
Labour	Matt Taylor	441	55.5	+2.0
Conservative	Michael Hampson	250	31.5	+5.8
Conservative	David McDowell	193	24.3	+1.4
Green	Peter Crook	125	15.7	−3.0
Majority		191	24.1	
Rejected ballots		7		
Turnout		794	24.23	0.9
Registered electors		3,277		
Labour hold		Swing		
Labour hold		Swing		

=== Temple ===
Temple
Party	Candidate	Votes	%	±%
Conservative	Pam Reddy	407	44.0	−0.1
Labour	Tony Riddington	339	36.6	+5.0
Green	David Newton	117	12.6	−11.8
Liberal Democrats	Louise Glasscoe	59	6.4	N/A
Majority		68	7.3	
Rejected ballots		4	7.3	
Turnout		926	51.99	
Registered electors		1,781		
Conservative hold		Swing		

=== Tintwistle ===
Tintwistle
Party	Candidate	Votes	%	±%
Labour	Rob Baker*	407	70.9	+20.2
Conservative	Ann Flavell	114	19.9	−13.7
Green	Robyn Hodgetts-Haley	50	8.7	−7.0
Majority		293	51.0	
Rejected ballots		3	0.5	
Turnout		574	32.88	
Registered electors		1,746		
Labour hold		Swing		

=== Whaley Bridge ===
Whaley Bridge (3 seats)
Party	Candidate	Votes	%	±%
Labour Co-op	Neville Clarke	1,353	59.9	+24.5
Labour Co-op	Joanne Taylor	1,249	55.3	+22.0
Liberal Democrats	David Lomax*	837	37.1	−3.3
Liberal Democrats	Andy Thomson	755	33.4	+5.9
Conservative	Lisa Hartington	486	21.5	−9.2
Conservative	David Hartington	460	20.4	−7.1
Conservative	Lewis King	447	19.8	−0.3
Majority		82	3.6	
Rejected ballots		6	0.3	
Turnout		2259	43.23	
Registered electors		5,225		
Liberal Democrats hold		Swing		
Labour hold		Swing		
Labour hold		Swing		

=== Whitfield ===
Whitfield
Party	Candidate	Votes	%	±%
Labour	Barbara Hastings-Asatourian	392	73.1	+12.9
Conservative	Norma Fozard	89	16.6	+1.3
Green	Philip Taylor	53	9.9	−3.6
Majority		303	56.5	
Rejected ballots		2	0.4	
Turnout		536	30.18	
Registered electors		1,776		
Labour hold		Swing		

== Changes 2023–2027 ==
- Kev Kirkham, elected as a Conservative in Cote Heath, left the party for Reform UK between 30 April and 16 May 2025; the council listed him as a Reform UK member until at least 18 July 2025. He subsequently left Reform UK, and by 13 August 2025 was listed as an independent.
- By April 2026, Neville Clarke, elected for Labour and Co-operative in Whaley Bridge, was sitting as an independent.
- By the end of April 2026, Madeline Hall, representing Corbar, had left Labour to sit as an independent. She cited dissatisfaction with national Labour politics and concerns about decisions affecting Buxton.
- By early June 2026, Rachael Quinn, representing Barms, had left Labour to sit as an independent. Her departure followed concerns about the future of Buxton Town Hall.
- By 19 June 2026, Chris Payne, representing Burbage, had left Labour to sit as an independent, citing concerns about the handling of Capital&Centric's plans for Buxton town centre and the opportunities for scrutiny and public consultation.
- Linda Grooby, elected as a Conservative in Cote Heath, ceased to belong to any political group on the council. She had led the Conservative group in opposition, and by August 2026, when Adrian Hopkinson was elected to succeed her as group leader, she was listed by the council as non-aligned.
