= Manor Park, Glossop =

English public park

Manor Park
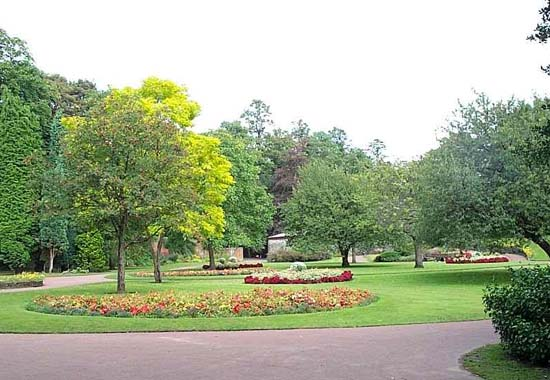
- Interactive map of Manor Park
- Type: Park
- Location: Glossop, Derbyshire, England
- Coordinates: 53°26′50″N 1°56′27″W
- Area: 60 acres
- Created: 1927
- Operator: High Peak Borough Council
- Open: All year

Manor Park is a city park in Glossop, Derbyshire, England.

== History ==
The park was originally part of the now demolished Glossop Hall, formerly called Royle Hall, and built circa 1729 by Kimberley Rose Clayton. In the mid-19th century the hall was extended and the roads around the hall re-routed. The site on which the hall resided was bought by Glossop Borough Council in April 1927 and Manor Park was officially opened in September 1927.

== Features ==
The park has formal landscaping, a lake, floral displays, specimen trees, borders and shrubs, woodland walks, a pavilion, a cafe, crown green bowling, a skate park, a statue, a miniature railway and train which you can go on and it takes you through the woodlands, a children's play area, tennis courts, basketball courts, football pitches and a sensory garden. There is a ridable miniature railway. Glossop Parkrun takes place in the park every Saturday morning at 9 a.m.

== Gallery ==
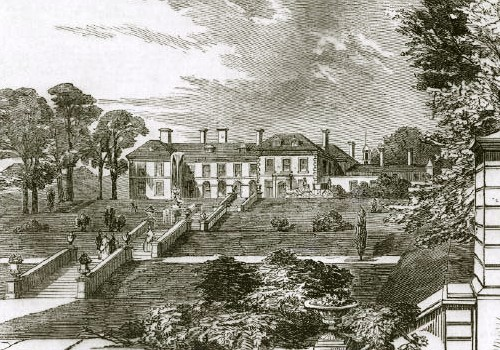
Glossop Hall formerly Royle Hall in the 1800s.

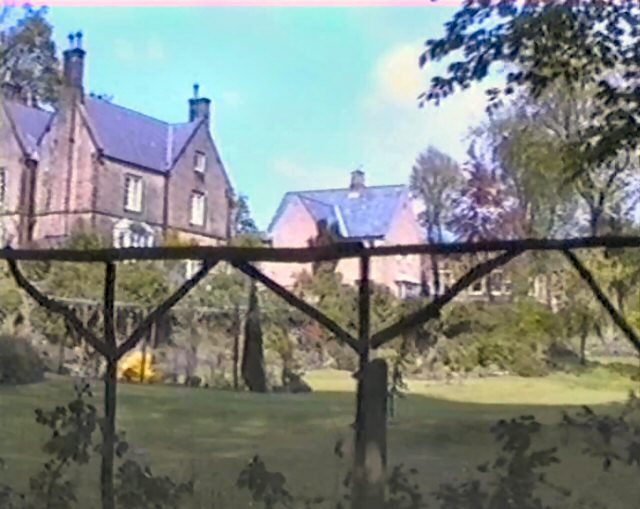
Manor Park Houses behind Manor Park.

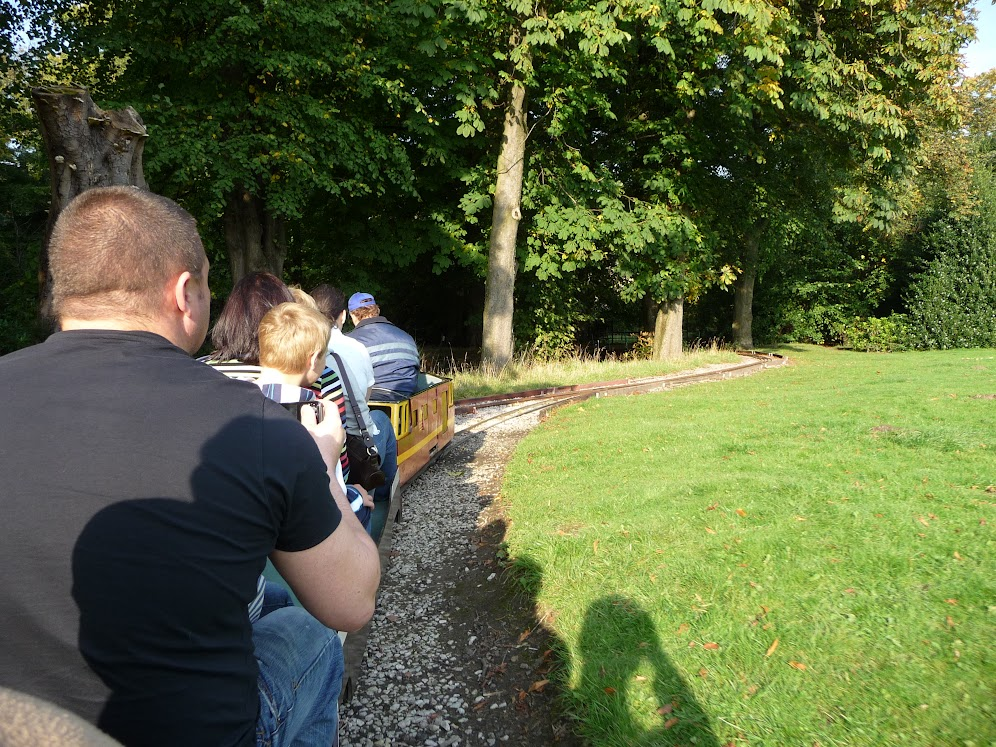
Riding on the Miniature railway.

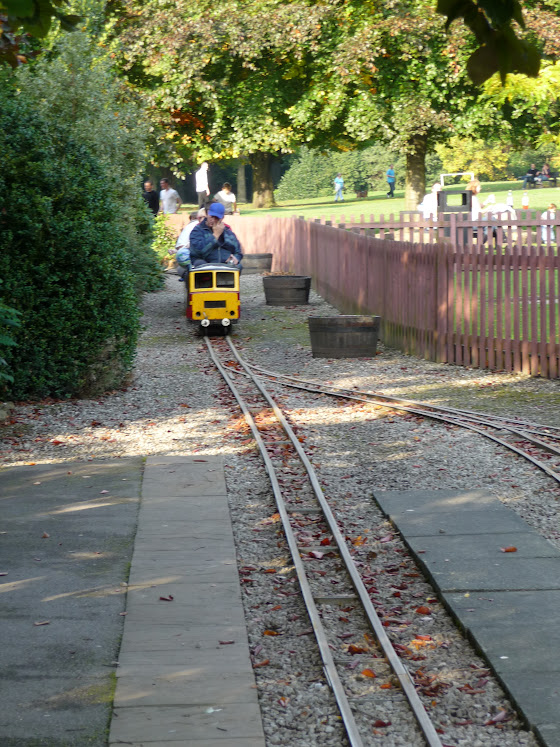
Miniature railway after a trip
