= Chapel en le Frith Rural District =

Historical rural district in Derbyshire, England

Chapel en le Frith
- Chapel en le Frith Rural District shown within Derbyshire in 1970.
- Area
  - 1911: 78,723 acres (318.58 km^{2})
  - 1961: 103,393 acres (418.42 km^{2})
- Population
  - 1911: 16,557
  - 1961: 18,385
- History
  - Created: 1894
  - Abolished: 1974
  - Succeeded by: High Peak
- Status: Rural district
- Government: Chapel en le Frith Rural District Council

Chapel en le Frith was a rural district in Derbyshire, England, from 1894 to 1974. It was named after the town of Chapel-en-le-Frith and created under the Local Government Act 1894.

It was enlarged to over 100,000 acres (40,000 ha) in 1934 when Glossop Dale Rural District and Hayfield Rural District were abolished and amalgamated into the district. The district was abolished in 1974 under the Local Government Act 1972 and combined with various other local government districts in northern Derbyshire to form the new High Peak district.

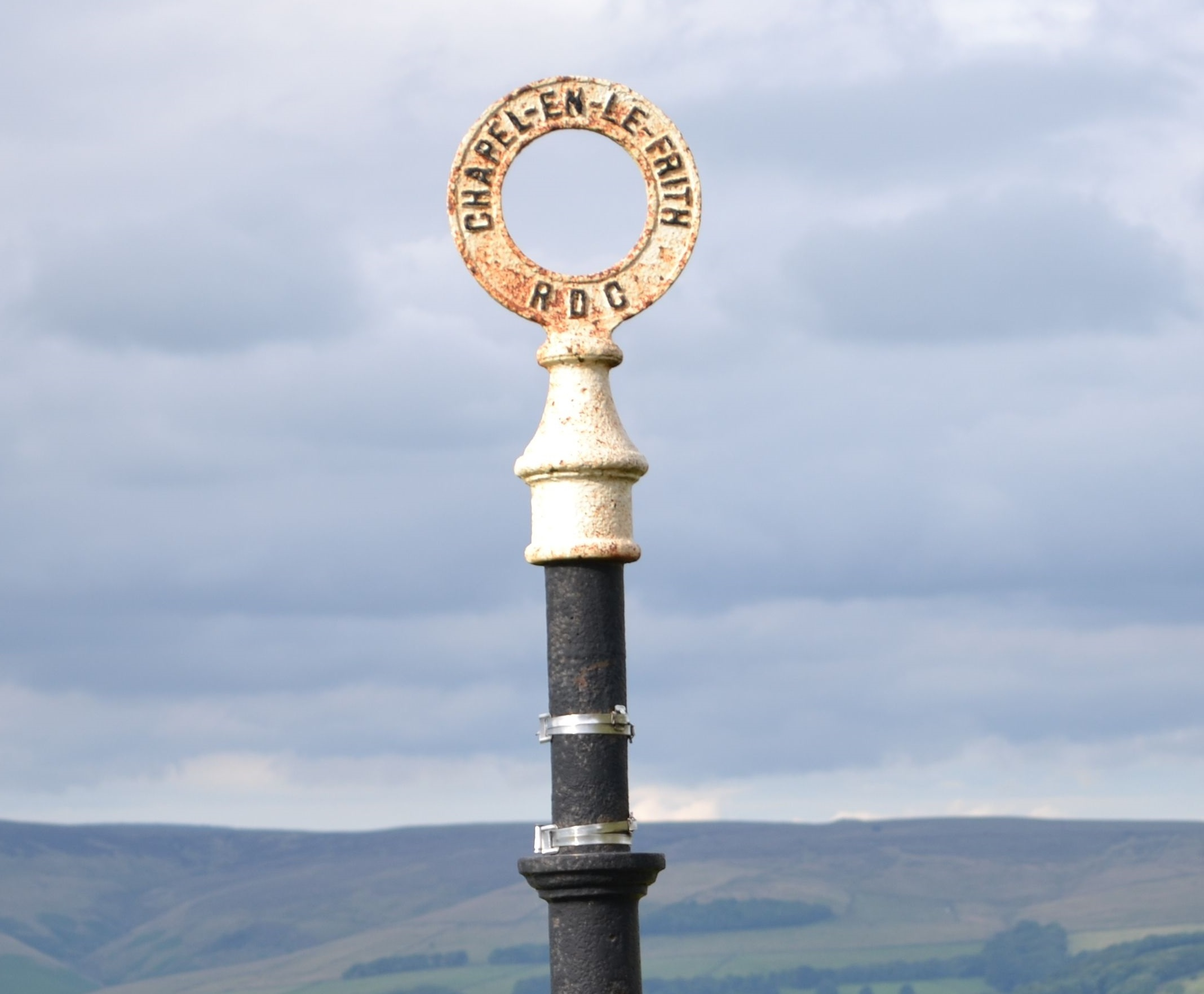
Old Chapel-en-le-Frith Rural District Council signpost on Cowlow Lane.

The Rural District Council used a complex of offices at Chinley, which had been built in 1902 as an isolation hospital and had been bought by the rural district council in 1953 and converted to become its offices. High Peak Borough Council inherited the site in 1974 and used the buildings as its main offices and meeting place until 2010.
