= High Peak Borough Council =

UK non-metropolitan district council

Type
- Type: Non-metropolitan district

Leadership
- Mayor: Barbara Hastings-Asatourian, Labour since 7 May 2026
- Leader: Anthony McKeown, Labour since 15 May 2019
- Chief Executive: Andrew Stokes since September 2020

Structure
- Seats: 43 councillors
- Graph of the party split among 43 seats.
- Political groups: Admistration (25) Labour (25) Other parties (18) Conservative (9) Green (2) Liberal Democrats (1) Reform (1) Independent (5)

Elections
- Voting system: First past the post
- Last election: 4 May 2023
- Next election: 6 May 2027

Meeting place
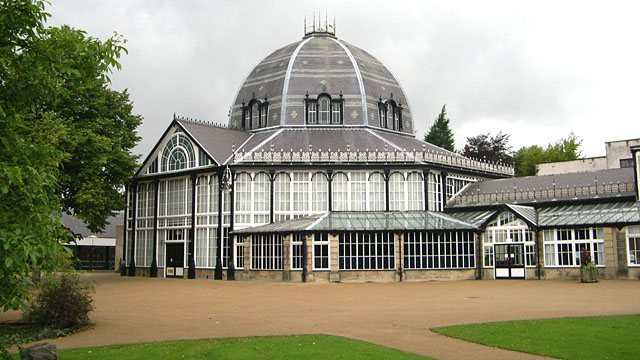
- Pavilion Gardens, St John's Road, Buxton, SK17 6BE

Website
- highpeak.gov.uk

High Peak Borough Council is the local authority for High Peak, a non-metropolitan district with borough status in Derbyshire, England. The administrative offices of High Peak Borough Council are split between sites in the towns of Buxton and Glossop. Full council meetings are usually held at the Pavilion Gardens in Buxton. The council is elected every four years. The council has been under Labour majority control since 2023.

== History ==
High Peak Borough Council was formed on 1 April 1974 under the Local Government Act 1972. The new council replaced the councils of six former districts, which were all abolished at the same time:

- Buxton Municipal Borough
- Chapel-en-le-Frith Rural District,
- Glossop Municipal Borough
- New Mills Urban District
- Tintwistle Rural District (which had been in the administrative county of Cheshire)
- Whaley Bridge Urban District

The new district was named "High Peak" after the medieval hundred of High Peak, which had covered much of the area. The district was granted borough status from its creation, allowing the chair of the council to take the title of mayor.

In February 2008, the council formed a strategic alliance with the neighbouring Staffordshire Moorlands District Council to share a number of services and staff as a way of reducing costs, including a shared chief executive and senior management team.

== Governance ==
High Peak Borough Council provides district-level services. County-level services are provided by Derbyshire County Council. Much of the borough is also covered by civil parishes, which form a third tier of local government. The towns of Buxton and Glossop are unparished areas, with High Peak Borough Council performing functions in those towns that would otherwise be the responsibility of parish councils.

Large parts of the borough are within the Peak District National Park. In those areas, town planning is the responsibility of the Peak District National Park Authority. The borough council appoints two of its councillors to serve on the 30-person National Park Authority.

=== Political control ===
The council has been under Labour majority control since the 2023 election.

The first election to the council was held in 1973, initially operating as a shadow authority alongside the outgoing authorities until the new arrangements came into effect on 1 April 1974. Political control of the council since 1974 has been as follows:

Party in control	Years
No overall control	1974–1976
Conservative	1976–1979
No overall control	1979–1995
Labour	1995–2003
No overall control	2003–2007
Conservative	2007–2011
No overall control	2011–2015
Conservative	2015–2019
Labour	2019–2022
No overall control	2022–2023
Labour	2023–present

=== Leadership ===
The role of Mayor of High Peak is largely ceremonial. Political leadership is instead provided by the leader of the council. The leaders since 2003 have been:

Councillor	Party	From	To
David Lomax	Liberal Democrats	2003	2007
John Faulkner	Conservative	May 2007	13 May 2008
Tony Ashton	Conservative	2008	May 2011
Caitlin Bisknell	Labour	May 2011	May 2015
Tony Ashton	Conservative	19 May 2015	May 2019
Anthony McKeown	Labour	15 May 2019	

=== Composition ===
Following the 2023 election, and subsequent changes of allegiance up to June 2026, the composition of the council was:

Party	Councillors
Labour	25
Conservative	9
Green	2
Liberal Democrats	1
Reform	1
Independent	5
Total	43

The next election is due in 2027.

== Premises ==
Full council meetings are generally held at the Pavilion Gardens in Buxton. The council's office functions are split between Buxton Town Hall and the Municipal Buildings in Glossop, both buildings having been inherited from the council's predecessor authorities.

The council also inherited offices at Chinley from Chapel-en-le-Frith Rural District Council. The Chinley complex had been built in 1902 as an isolation hospital and had been bought by the rural district council in 1953 and converted to become its offices. High Peak Borough Council used the Chinley buildings as its main offices and meeting place with the other buildings serving as additional offices until 2010, when the Chinley site was closed and subsequently sold as a cost-saving measure.

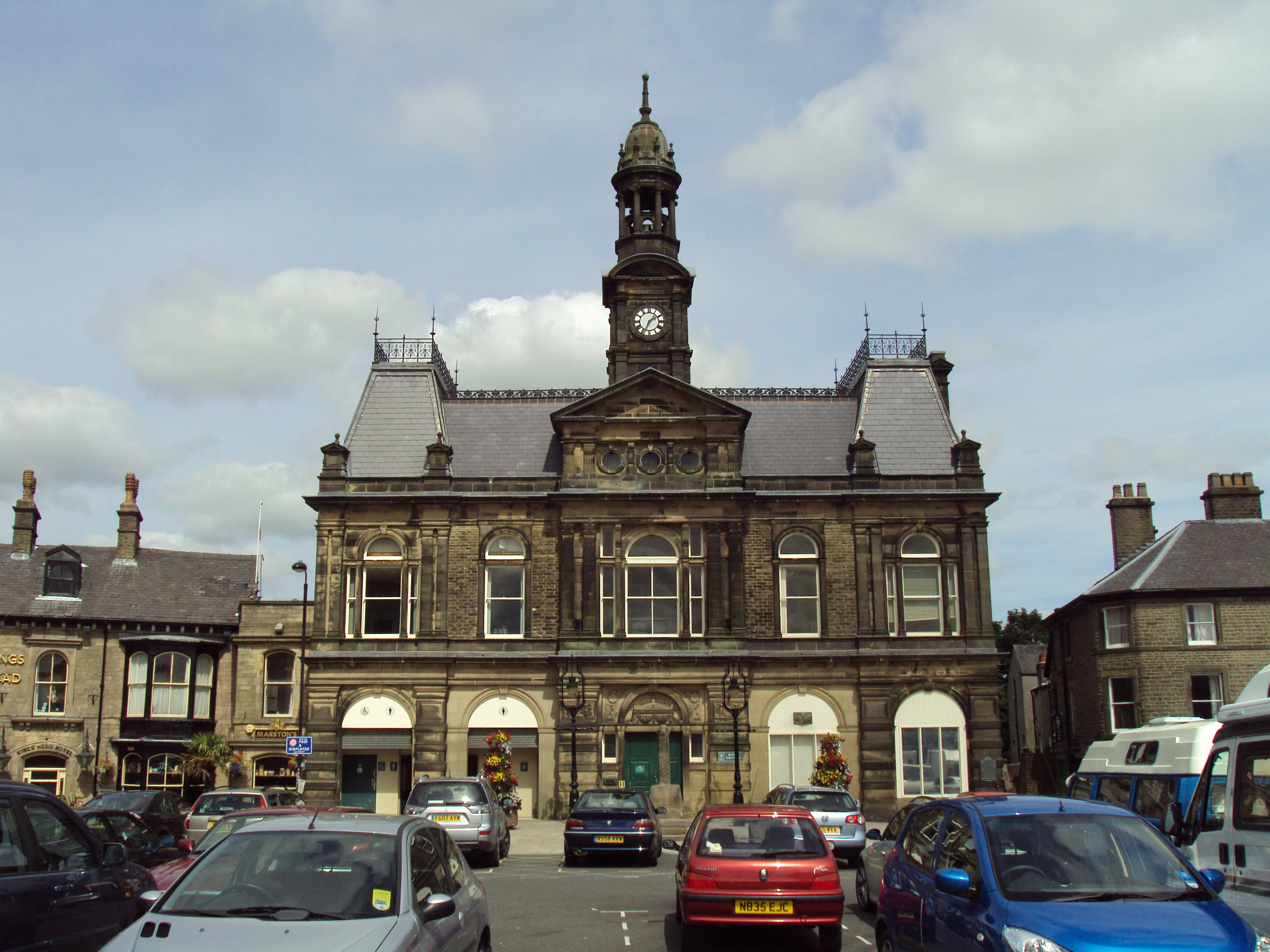
Buxton Town Hall

Municipal Buildings, Glossop

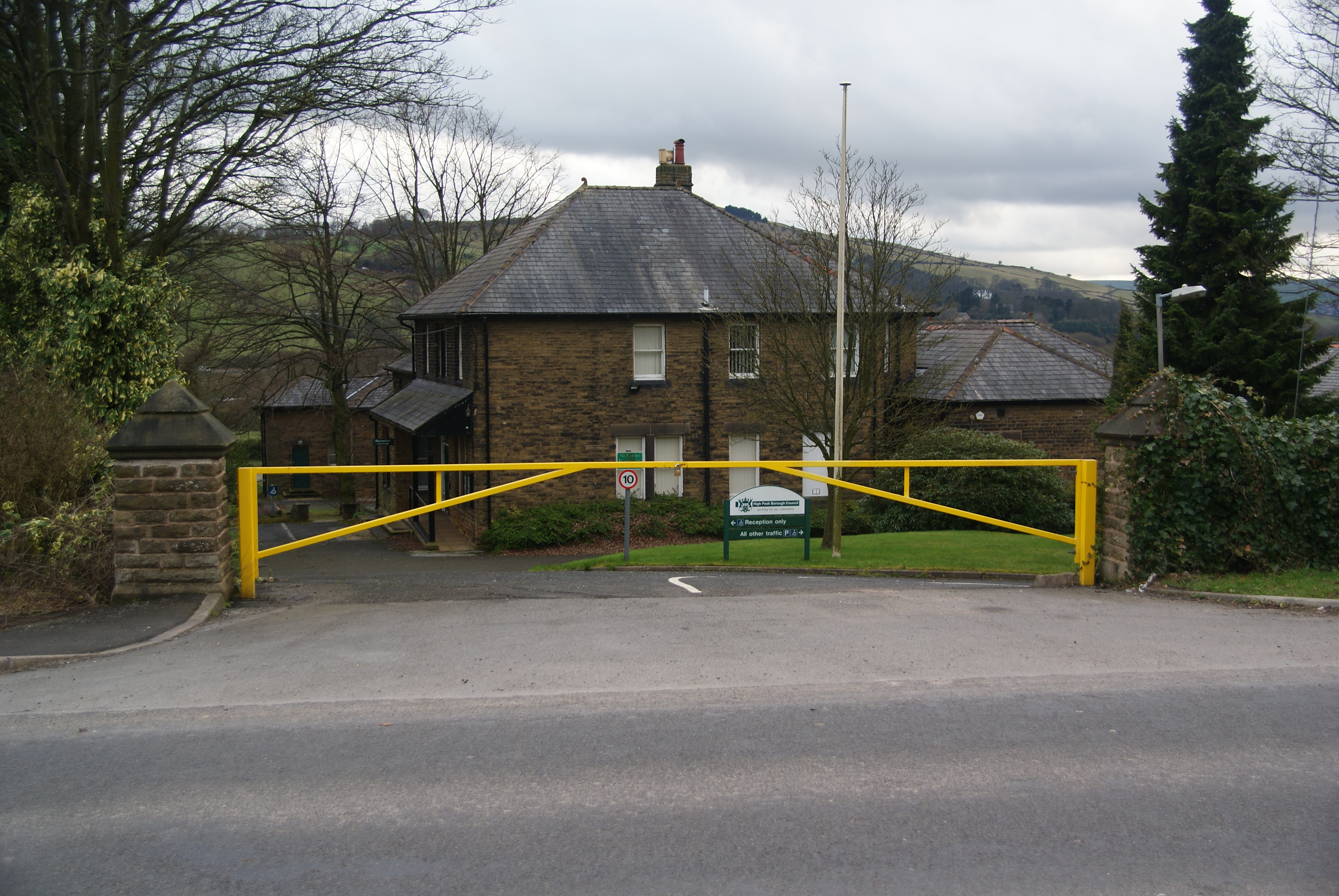
Former council offices at Chinley, closed 2010

== Mayor of High Peak ==
The mayor presides at meetings of the council and acts as first citizen of the borough. The role is usually held by a different councillor each year. They are expected to be politically impartial during their term of office as mayor, although they do get an additional casting vote in the event of a tie. Former mayors include:

- 2010–11: Graham Oakley
- 2011–12: David Lomax
- 2012–13: Pat Jenner
- 2013–14: Tony Kemp
- 2014–15: Alan Barrow
- 2015–16: Stuart Young
- 2016–17: George Wharmby
- 2017–18: Matt Stone
- 2018–19: Linda Grooby
- 2019–21: Ed Kelly (Note: Served two years due to the COVID-19 pandemic)
- 2021–22: Paul Hardy
- 2022–23: Ollie Cross
- 2023–24: Peter Inman
- 2024–25: Stewart Gardner
- 2025–26: Dom Starkey
- 2026–: Barbara Hastings-Assatourian

== Elections ==
Map of electoral wards in High Peak

Since the last boundary changes in 2015 the council has comprised 43 councillors elected from 28 wards, with each ward electing one, two or three councillors. Elections are held every four years.

== Arms ==
Coat of arms of High Peak Borough Council

Notes
Granted 1976
Crest
On a wreath Or and Vert a piece of Blue john stone Proper within a chevron Sable.
Escutcheon
Sable three piles Or on a base enarched Vert fimbrated Or a fountain.
Supporters
On either side a stag Or attired and unguled Sable gorged with a mural crown Vert and resting the interior hind leg on a piece of Blue John Stone Proper.
Motto
Consilio Semper Publico (Ever in the Public Interest)
Badge
A fountain within a triangle Sable.
