= Black Edge =

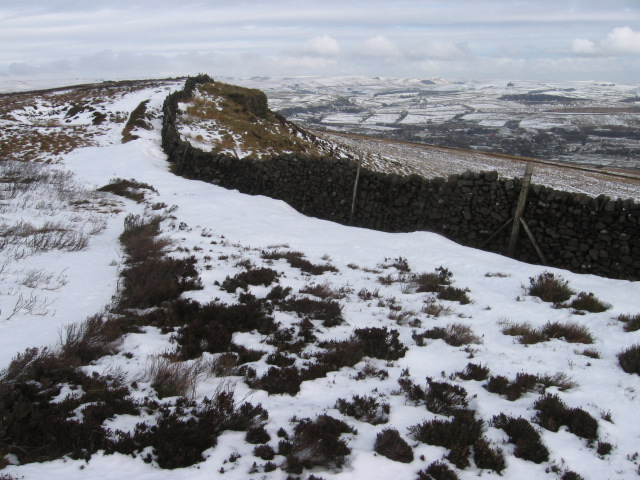
- Black Edge on Combs Moss

Highest point
- Elevation: 507 m (1,663 ft)
- Prominence: 99 m
- Parent peak: Shining Tor
- Listing: Dewey, SubHuMP
- Coordinates: 53.2898°N 1.9081°W

Geography
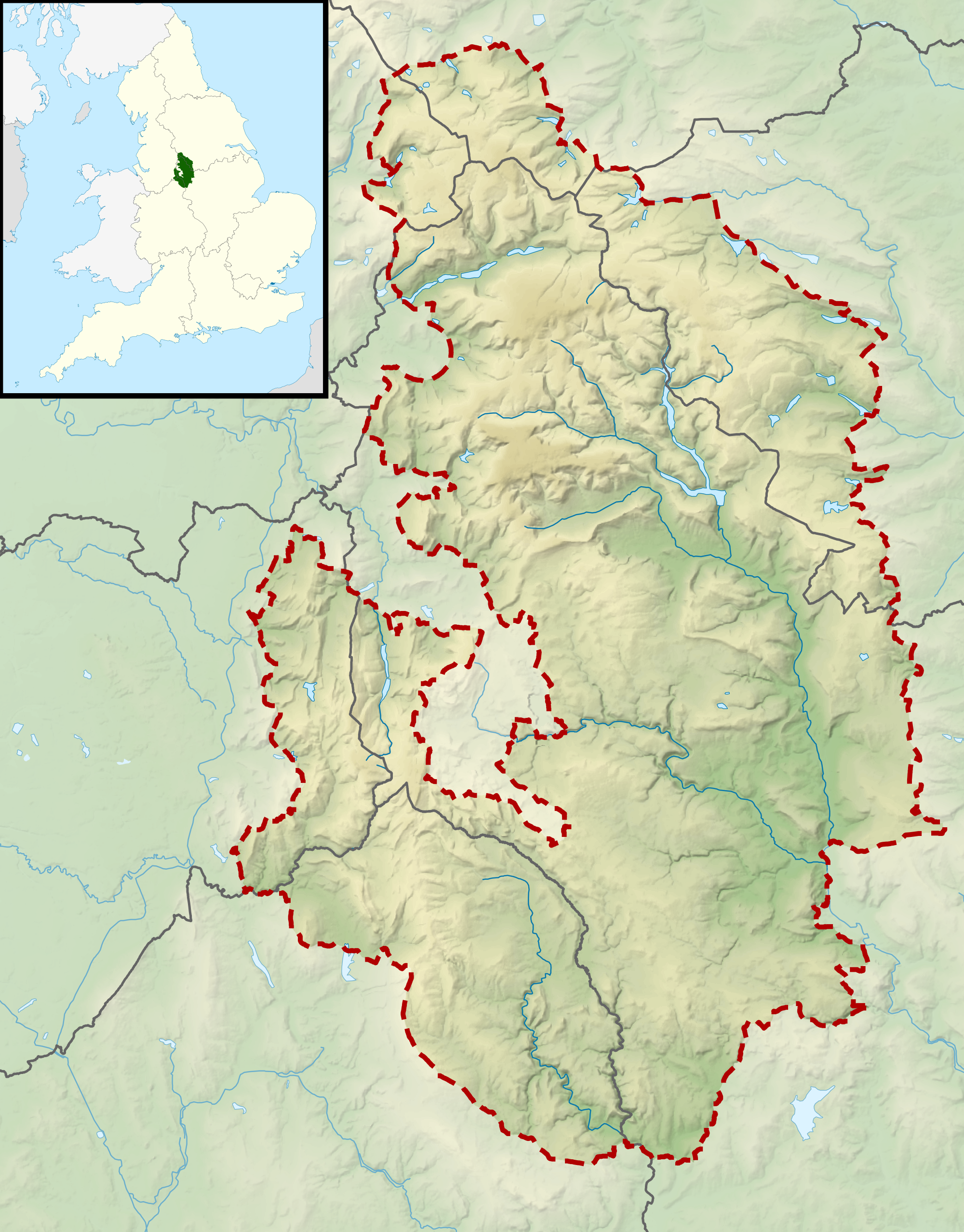
- Location within the Peak District Location within Derbyshire
- Location: Derbyshire, England
- Parent range: Peak District
- OS grid: SK062770
- Topo map: OS Landranger 119; OL24W

Black Edge is a summit, 507 metres (1,663 ft) high, on a sharp ridgeline above the village of Dove Holes in the Dark Peak area of the Peak District in the county of Derbyshire in England.

== Geography ==
=== Location ===
The summit of Black Edge is marked by a trig point which is about 1.8 kilometres (1.1 mi) southwest of Dove Holes and 3.5 kilometres (2.2 mi) north of the historic spa town of Buxton. It lies in open moorland on the gritstone crest of the eponymous escarpment that runs roughly north to south. There are alternative summits at SK062771 and SK060763. In addition the ground 130 metres to the north and the ruined building 650 metres south-southeast are at the same height as the summit.

=== Surrounding area ===
Nine hundred metres further north, also on the crest, is Hob Tor. Here the escarpment swings northwest, while a short spur, on which there is a tumulus known as Lady Low, heads northeast. To the west of Black Edge the heather-clad terrain of Combs Moss descends initially slowly for about a kilometre before dropping steeply into the valley south of Combs Reservoir. To the east of Black Edge, the escarpment dives into the lowlands north of Buxton. A railway line hugs the foot of the scarp slope and is paralleled to the east by the A6.
