= Combs Moss =

Hill in the Derbyshire Peak District

Coordinates: 53°16′55″N 1°55′53″W

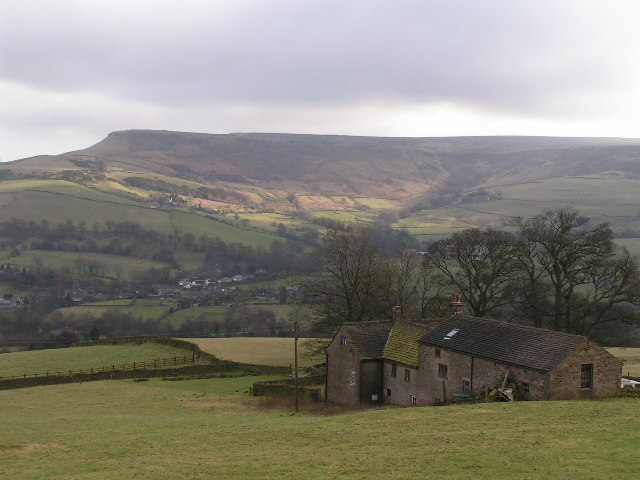
- Combs Moss from Thorny Lee

Highest point
- Elevation: 503 metres (1,650 ft)

Geography
- Location: Peak District, England
- OS grid: SK0476
- Topo map: OS Explorer OL24

Combs Moss is a plateau-topped hill between Chapel-en-le-Frith and Buxton in Derbyshire, in the Peak District. The summit, Combs Head, is 503 metres (1,650 ft) above sea level. At its northern tip is a prehistoric promontory fort called Castle Naze.

The moorland plateau is flanked by Combs Edge and the Goyt Valley to the west, the village of Combs to the north, Black Edge and Dove Holes to the east and Buxton to the south. The Midshires Way long-distance footpath follows a Roman Road across the southwestern end of Combs Moss.

Much of Combs Moss is a privately owned grouse moor, with a shooting hut and grouse butts. Following the Countryside and Rights of Way Act 2000, the area was designated as "Open Access" land for the public.

Combs Moss is named after the nearby village of Combs. The Old English word "combe" (pronounced as "coom") means small valley, often on the side of a hill. "Moss" is a term for a moorland or peat bog.

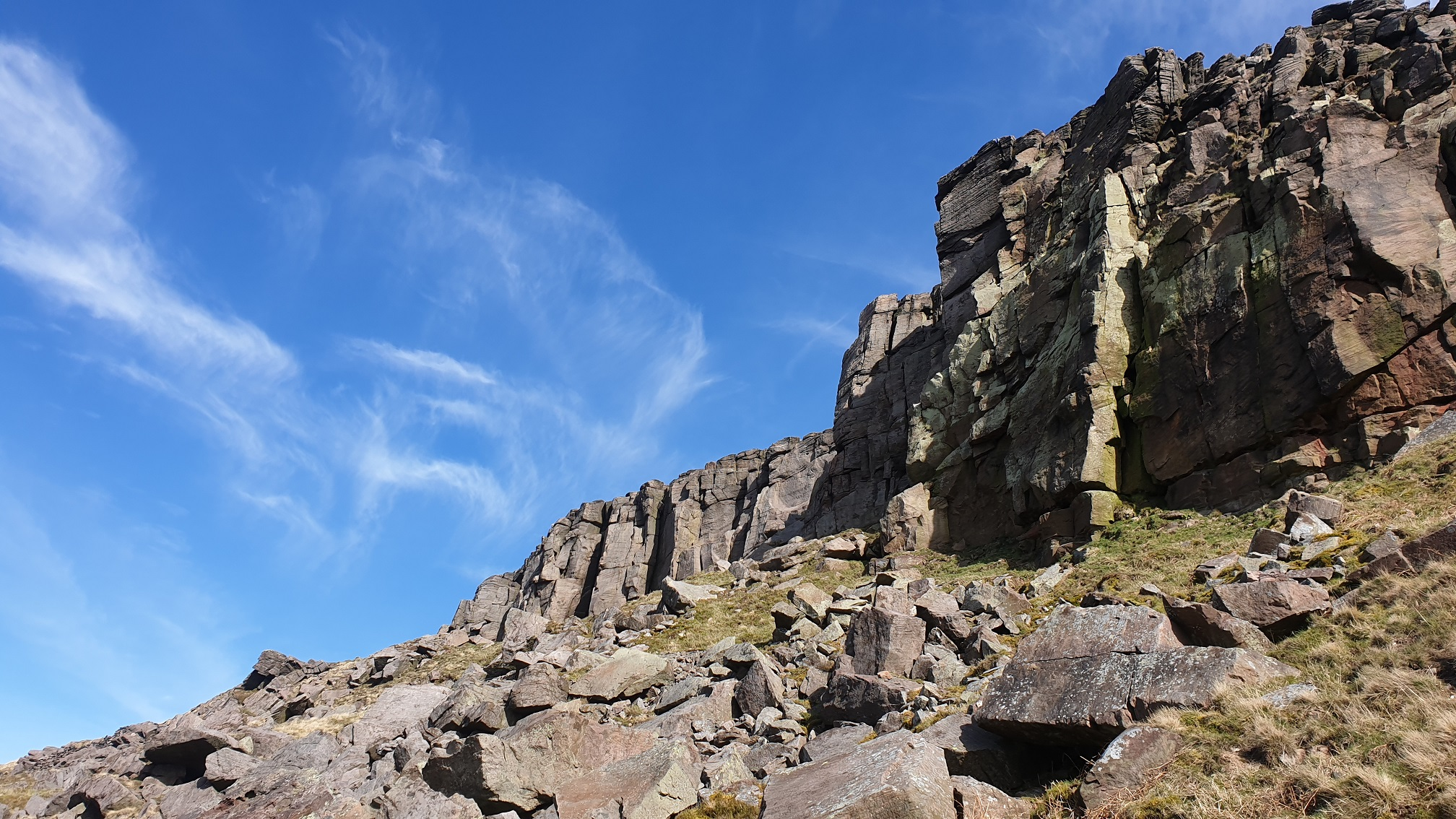
Castle Naze Crags on Combs Moss

== Castle Naze ==
Castle Naze is the site of a prehistoric hillfort at the northwest edge of Combs Moss, overlooking Combs Reservoir (a designated Site of Special Scientific Interest). The fort is over 2 acres (0.81 ha) in extent with a triangular layout. There is a substantial defensive double rampant on the southeast side and protective rock edges on the other sides. The is a clear causeway up the hillside to the former entrance to the fort. In 1873 a Roman coin of Emperor Constantine the Great and Romano-British pottery were found. Nottingham University students conducted a survey of the site in 1957 and concluded that the fort had been built during the Iron Age period and was reconstructed in Medieval times. Buried remains were uncovered of pits, hearths, workshops and the postholes and foundations of buildings. Castle Naze hillfort is a protected Scheduled Monument. The place-name "Naze" derives from Old English næss "ness, promontory, headland".

The gritstone escarpment at Castle Naze is a popular location for crag climbers.
