= Buxton Pavilion Gardens =

Historic landscaped park in Buxton, Derbyshire, England

The Pavilion Gardens
- formerly Serpentine Walks
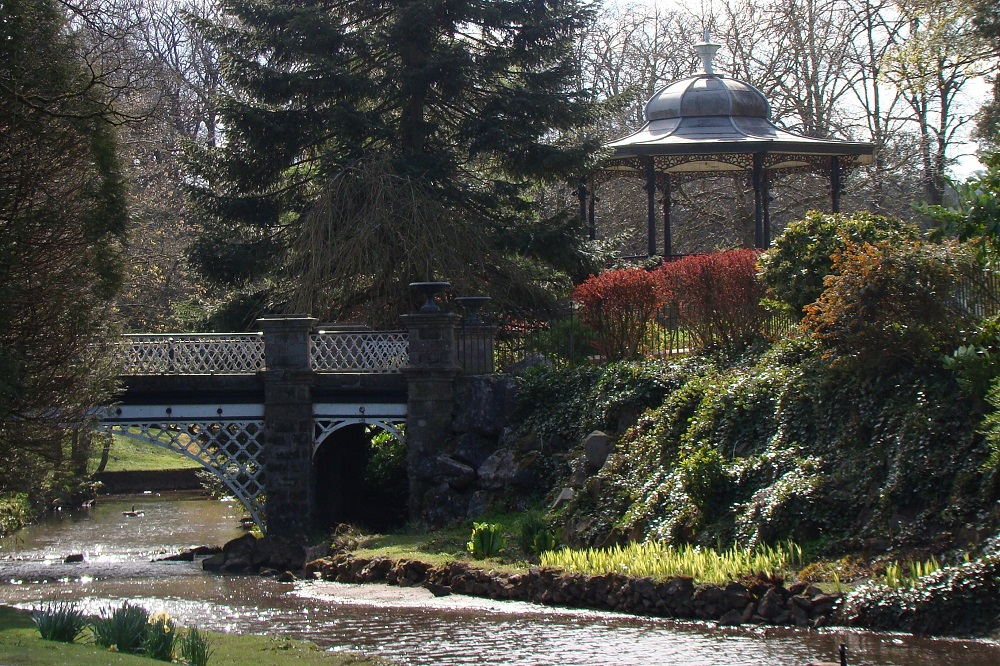
- Milner Bridge over River Wye and Bandstand
- Interactive map of The Pavilion Gardens
- Location: Buxton, Derbyshire
- Coordinates: 53°15′N 1°56′W
- Area: 14 hectares (35 acres)
- Elevation: 300 m (980 ft)
- Created: 1871
- Designer: Edward Milner
- Designation: Grade II* Listed Park

Buxton Pavilion Gardens is a Victorian landscaped public park in the spa town of Buxton in Derbyshire. The River Wye flows through the gardens, which are a Grade II* listed public park of Special Historic Interest.

== Features ==
The 9.5-hectare (23-acre) site of the Pavilion Gardens lies in the valley of the River Wye. Two tributaries of the river run through the park along landscaped courses. The northern branch spills over cascades and under footbridges whilst the southern branch connects three man-made lakes, the last of which has a fountain. The listed park covers a longer stretch of the River Wye valley, covering 14 hectares (35 acres) in total including the adjoining Serpentine park and Branksome Woods.

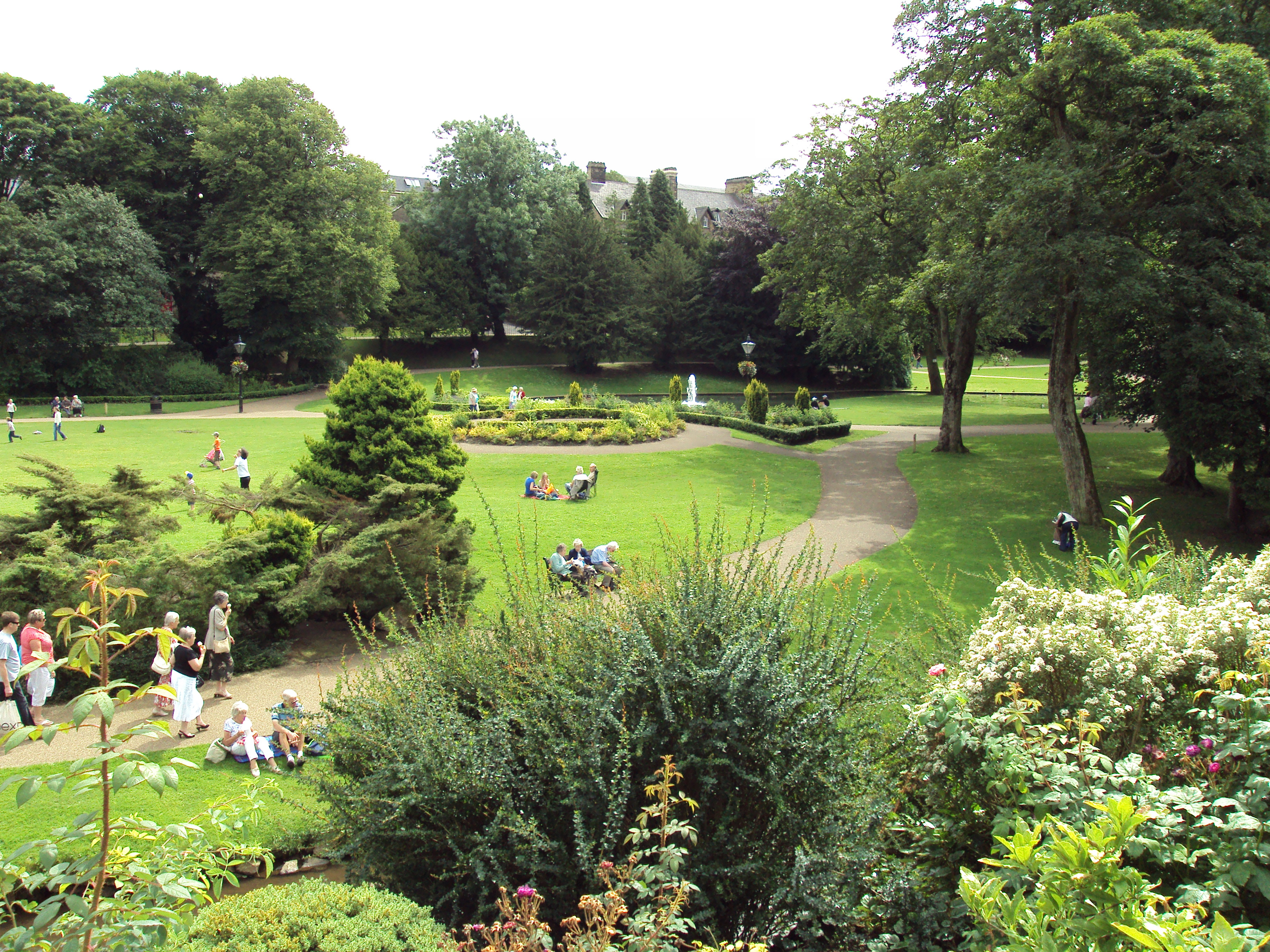
Landscaped gardens

In 2004 a major restoration of the Pavilion Gardens was completed with a contribution of £3.3m from Heritage Lottery funding. New facilities included a Victorian-style bandstand (used for summer band concerts and weddings), play areas, an outdoor gym and a children's miniature railway ride. The pavilion café, ice cream parlour, visitor shop and art gallery are housed in the main pavilion building. The Buxton Cinema is located in the adjoining Pavilion Arts Centre. Next to the pavilion buildings is an indoor public swimming pool and fitness centre overlooking the gardens and a public car park (the entrance is on Burlington Road).

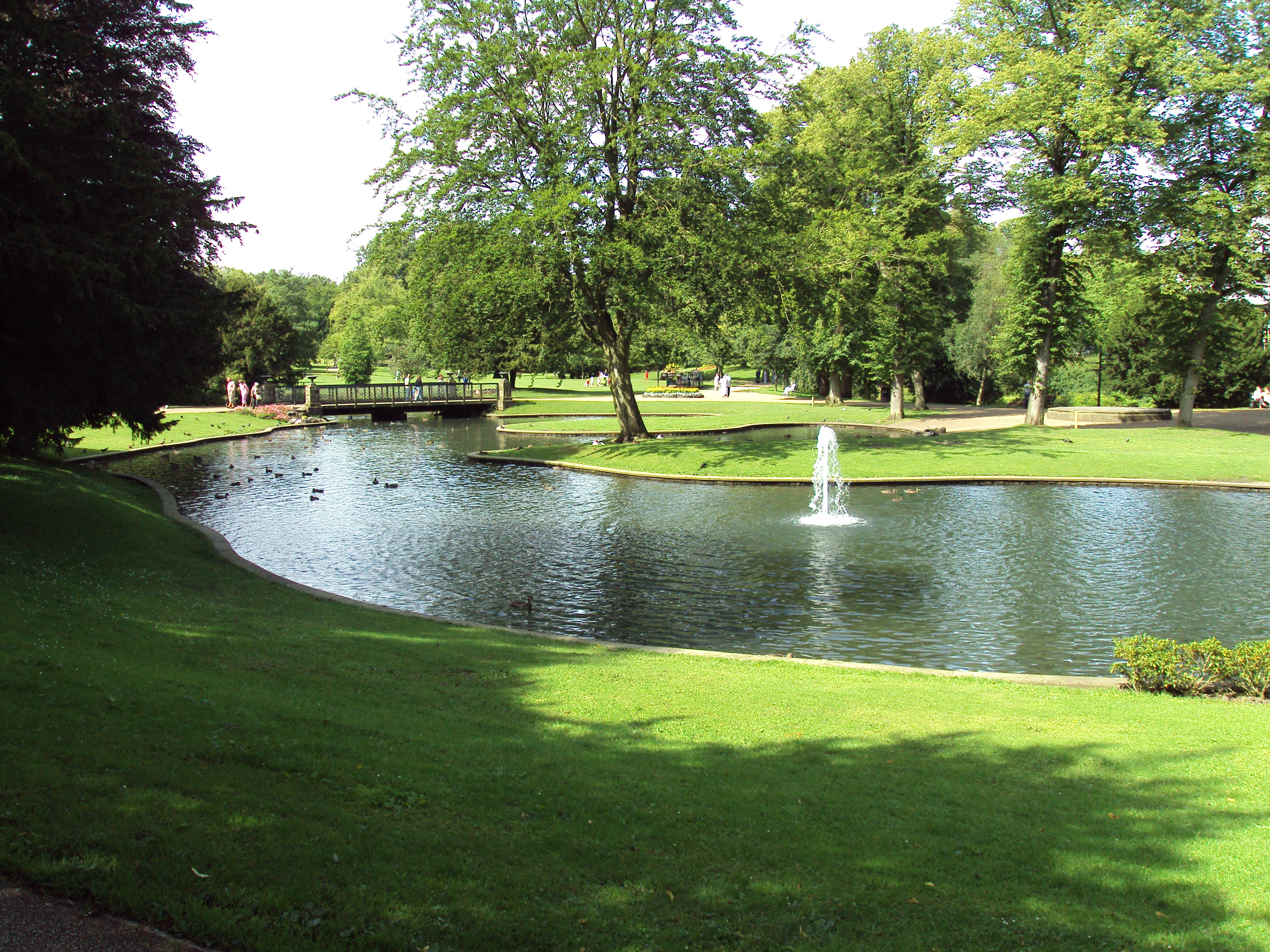
Lower lake

The river, lakes, trees and plants are a haven for birds including native ducks, Muscovy ducks, mandarin ducks, tufted ducks, Canada geese, moorhens, coots, goosanders, wrens, nuthatches, finches, tits and herons. The river provides habitat for brown trout, water voles and crayfish.

In 2015, author Bill Bryson declared:

"The Pavilion Gardens ... must be the most delightful town park in the country."

On the south east boundary of the Pavilion Gardens is the Broadwalk promenade which was constructed as Cavendish Terrace in 1857.

== History ==
The park was designed by Edward Milner for the Buxton Improvements Company, following the arrival of the railway to Buxton in 1863. It was opened in August 1871 on a 12-acre site (on the land of the Hall Gardens, given by the 7th Duke of Devonshire) and in 1876 was extended to its present 23 acres of gardens and lakes. There was originally an admission charge to enter the gardens via a ticket office with turnstiles. Milner's design was a development of the 1830s landscape design of the Serpentine Walks (along the River Wye) by Joseph Paxton for the 6th Duke of Devonshire, on what was previously the private gardens of Buxton Old Hall. The three original rustic bridges were removed in Milner's design, with the introduction of ornate iron footbridges, the main one known as the Milner Bridge.

King Edward VII and Queen Alexandra took a tour of the Pavilion Gardens when they visited Buxton in January 1905. During World War I Royal Engineers soldiers based in Buxton used the Pavilion Garden lakes for training exercises to build pontoon bridges. In 1927 responsibility for the Pavilion Gardens was transferred from the Buxton Gardens Company to the Buxton Borough Council.

The old bandstand platform is all that is left of an ancient Celtic temple. It was described in 1755 as having an octagonal base and a faint inscription appearing as 'Aeona'. It was concluded that the temple was dedicated to either Epona (goddess of horses) or more appropriately Apona (goddess of healing waters). When Edward Milner remodelled the Pavilion Gardens in 1871 the 2,000-year-old temple was demolished and only the base now remains.

== Buildings ==
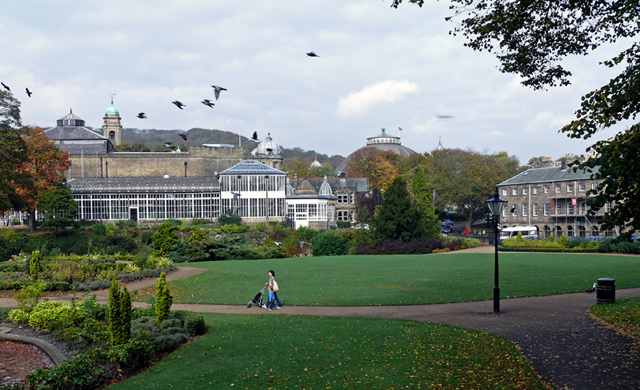
Conservatory and Opera House

A series of Grade II listed Victorian buildings overlook the Gardens from its northern boundary with a wide promenade in front. The main Pavilion and Conservatory are cast-iron and glass structures from 1870, designed by Milner in the style of London's Crystal Palace. The two-storey central hall of the Pavilion (which now houses the café) was rebuilt in 1983 after a fire. The Conservatory was originally used as a small concert hall with a stage and organ. In 1982 it was remodelled as a greenhouse conservatory with tropical plants and a fish pond.

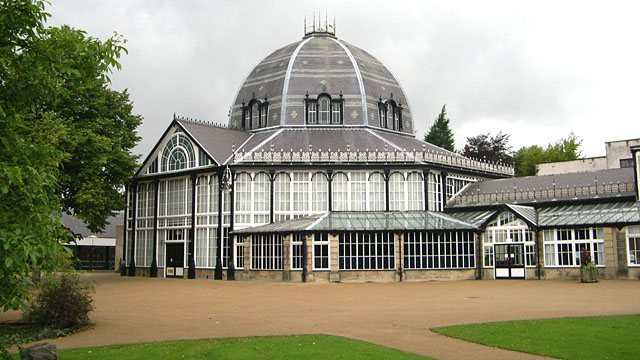
Octagon Concert Hall

The Pavilion was extended with the construction in 1875 of the Octagon Concert Hall (by Robert Rippon Duke). With capacity for 800 people, the hall has been used over the years for musical concerts, tea dances, conferences, trade shows, antique fairs and farmers' markets. The Beatles played in the Octagon Concert Hall on two occasions in 1963. The Octagon reopened in 2018 after a three-year £3m refurbishment.

At the north east corner of the Pavilion Gardens is the Buxton Opera House (designed by Frank Matcham). Built in 1903, it is the town's principal theatrical venue with 900 seats. The Opera House was primarily used as a cinema from 1932 until its closure in 1976. The Edwardian theatre reopened for stage productions following its restoration in 1979. Since its full renovation in 2001, the theatre has developed a busy programme of events covering drama, musical concerts, comedy, dance, opera and pantomime. It is also hosts the annual Buxton Festival.

Within the main pavilion complex, the Pavilion Arts Centre on St John's Road has a theatre with 360 seats and it has been the home of the Buxton Cinema since 2017. The building was designed by William Bryden and was built as the Entertainment Stage theatre in 1889. It replaced an earlier theatre in the old hall stables, facing the Old Hall Hotel at the foot of Hall Bank. In 1833 the world-famous violinist Niccolo Paganini performed there but the theatre was demolished in 1854. After the opening of the Buxton Opera House, the Entertainment Stage was converted to show silent movies and was renamed as the Hippodrome. In 1932 it reverted to being used as a performance theatre called The Playhouse. It was subsequently known as the Paxton Suite from 1979 to 2010.

A large Oriental Tea Kiosk was built in 1899 (designed by William Bryden). It was used in the 1960s as an amusement arcade but it was demolished in 1977.

== Leisure ==
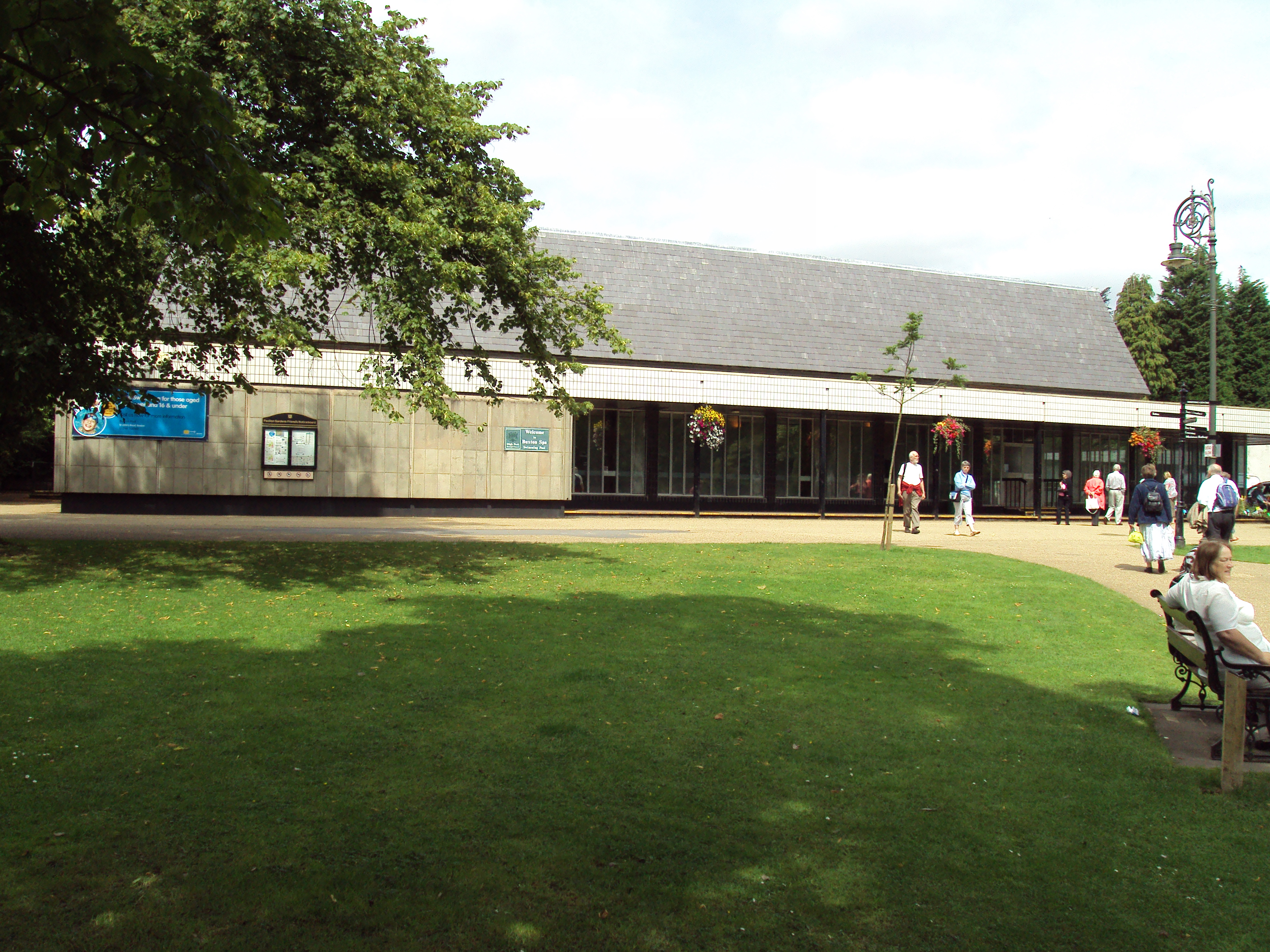
Swimming pool

The indoor swimming pool and gym complex next to the Octagon was completed in 1972 and opened by Princess Anne.

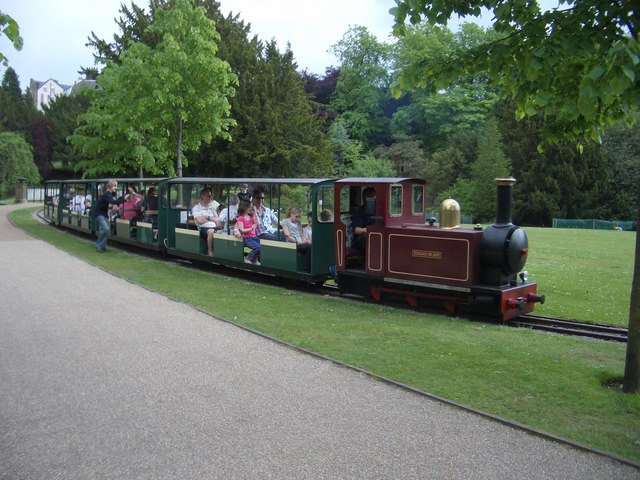
Miniature railway

The Pavilion Gardens originally provided leisure facilities for tennis, croquet, boating on the largest lake and roller skating, as well as curling and ice skating in winter (on an ice rink where the car park is now). Tennis tournaments were played in the Pavilion Gardens from 1884 until the 1950s, including the All-England Ladies Doubles Championship and with a covered stand for spectators.

In 2019 boating was reintroduced on the main lake.

The Pavilion Gardens is the starting point for the Dane Valley Way footpath, and the Peak District Boundary Walk also runs through the gardens.

Other historical landscaped parks in Buxton are Ashwood Park and The Slopes (formerly The Terrace).

== See also ==
- List of parks and open spaces in Derbyshire
- Listed buildings in Buxton
