= Derbyshire County Council elections =

Local government elections in Derbyshire, England

Derbyshire County Council elections are held every four years. Derbyshire County Council is the upper-tier authority for the non-metropolitan county of Derbyshire in England. Since the last boundary changes in 2013, 64 councillors have been elected from 61 electoral divisions.

== Council composition ==
Year	Labour	Conservative	Liberal Democrats (Note: Includes totals for the predecessors of the Liberal Democrats, the Liberal Party and SDP (both of which participated in the Alliance).)	Reform	Green	Independents & Others	Council control after election
Local government reorganisation; council established (98 seats)
1973	61	25	5	–	–	7	Labour
1977	30	62	0	–	0	6	Conservative
New division boundaries; seats decreased from 98 to 84
1981	59	21	1	–	0	3	Labour
1985	54	24	4	–	0	2	Labour
1989	51	27	3	–	0	3	Labour
1993	55	21	7	–	0	1	Labour
Derby becomes a unitary authority; seats decreased from 84 to 64
1997	45	12	6	–	0	1	Labour
2001	43	13	7	–	0	1	Labour
New division boundaries
2005	38	15	10	–	0	1	Labour
2009	22	33	8	–	0	1	Conservative
New division boundaries
2013	43	18	3	–	0	0	Labour
2017	24	37	3	–	0	0	Conservative
2021	14	45	4	0	1	0	Conservative
New division boundaries
2025	3	12	3	42	2	2	Reform

== County result maps ==
2005

2009

2013

2017

2021

2025

== By-election results ==
=== 1993–1997 ===
Somercotes by-election 5 September 1996
Party	Candidate	Votes	%	±%
Labour	Paul Smith	1,300	58.5	
Conservative		620	27.9	
Liberal Democrats		301	13.6	
Majority		680	30.6	
Turnout		2,221	25.0	
Labour hold		Swing		

=== 1997–2001 ===
Newhall by-election 13 November 1997
Party	Candidate	Votes	%	±%
Labour		966	71.7	+6.5
Conservative		229	17.0	−4.1
Liberal Democrats		153	11.4	−2.3
Majority		737	54.7	
Turnout		1,348	13.4	
Labour hold		Swing		

Melbourne by-election 13 April 2000
Party	Candidate	Votes	%	±%
Conservative		1,789	49.1	+2.8
Labour		1,611	44.0	+3.0
Liberal Democrats		251	6.9	−5.9
Majority		187	5.1	
Turnout		3,651	28.7	
Conservative hold		Swing		

=== 2001–2005 ===
Dronfield North by-election 27 September 2001
Party	Candidate	Votes	%	±%
Labour		943	44.1	−0.1
Liberal Democrats		710	33.2	+12.3
Conservative		487	22.8	−12.0
Majority		233	10.9	
Turnout		2,140	23.0	
Labour hold		Swing		

West Hallam by-election 29 April 2004
Party	Candidate	Votes	%	±%
Conservative	Carol Hart	1,443	56.8	+12.3
Liberal Democrats	Janet Mallet	571	22.5	+5.7
Labour		525	20.7	−18.1
Majority		872	34.3	
Turnout		2,539	30.3	
Conservative hold		Swing		

=== 2005–2009 ===
Eckington by-election 3 July 2008
Party	Candidate	Votes	%	±%
Labour	Steve Pickering	824	35.9	−15.3
Conservative	Carolyn Renwick	658	28.6	+11.0
Independent	James Jesson	300	13.1	+4.1
BNP	Lewis Allesbrook	253	11.0	+11.0
Independent	David Walpole	150	6.5	−1.7
Liberal Democrats	Frank Higgins	113	4.9	−9.1
Majority		166	7.3	
Turnout		2,298	26.6	
Labour hold		Swing		

=== 2009–2013 ===
Kirk Hallam by-election 16 July 2009
Party	Candidate	Votes	%	±%
Labour	Michelle Booth	1,261	49.9	−15.9
Conservative	Kevin Miller	783	31.0	−3.3
BNP	Mark Bailey	327	12.9	+12.9
Liberal Democrats	Richard Pyle	158	6.2	+6.2
Majority		478	18.9	
Turnout		2,529	29.2	
Labour hold		Swing		

=== 2013–2017 ===
Alport and Derwent by-election 14 November 2014
Party	Candidate	Votes	%	±%
Conservative	David Taylor (E)	1118	44.9	+3.1
UKIP	David Fisher	715	28.7	+3.6
Labour	Mike Ratcliffe	656	26.4	+1.2
Majority		403	16.2	
Turnout		2489	25.8	
Conservative hold		Swing		

Brimington by-election 5 February 2015
Party	Candidate	Votes	%	±%
Labour	Tricia Gilby (E)	1293	62.0	−6.7
UKIP	Paul Christopher Stone	380	18.2	+18.2
Independent	Mick Bagshaw	157	7.5	+7.5
Liberal Democrats	John Edward Ahern	135	6.5	−2.8
Conservative	Lewis Mark Preston	120	5.8	−5.4
Majority				
Turnout		2085	21.9	
Labour hold		Swing		

Ashbourne by-election 7 May 2015
Party	Candidate	Votes	%	±%
Conservative	Stephen Bull (E)	4715	68.6	+9.5
Labour	Simon John Meredith	965	14.0	+1.5
Green	Andrew White	647	9.4	+9.4
Liberal Democrats	David Rowe	543	7.9	−0.7
Majority				
Turnout		6870	73.3	
Conservative hold		Swing		

Derwent Valley by-election 24 September 2015
Party	Candidate	Votes	%	±%
Conservative	Jo Wild	1017	51.0	+8.1
Labour	Martin Rutter	466	21.5	−1.7
Liberal Democrats	Michael Crapper	314	13.6	+4.6
UKIP	Mike Dawson	285	13.1	−11.0
Majority		641	29.5	
Turnout		2172		
Conservative hold		Swing		

=== 2017–2021 ===
Whaley Bridge by-election 13 February 2020
Party	Candidate	Votes	%	±%
Labour	Ruth George	1851	50.4	
Conservative	John Frederick Walton	1048	28.5	
Liberal Democrats	David William Lomax	721	19.6	
Independent	Paddy Bann	52	1.4	
Turnout		3,672		
Labour gain from Conservative		Swing		

=== 2021–2025 ===
Long Eaton by-election 27 October 2022
Party	Candidate	Votes	%	±%
Labour	Joel Bryan	1,104	51.1	+15.0
Conservative	Chris Page	723	33.5	−16.5
Liberal Democrats	Rachel Allen	239	11.1	+5.0
Green	Ashley Dunn	94	4.4	−3.5
Majority		381	17.6	
Turnout		2,260	22.8	
Labour gain from Conservative		Swing		

Swadlincote South by-election 31 August 2023
Party	Candidate	Votes	%	±%
Labour	Alan Haynes	786	62.2	+29.8
Conservative	Jacqueline Geddes	477	37.8	−21.4
Majority		309	24.5	
Turnout		1,263		
Labour gain from Conservative		Swing		

=== 2025-2029 ===
Long Eaton North by-election 2 December 2025
Party	Candidate	Votes	%	±%
Reform	Owen Ferron	745	28.1	−7.7
Conservative	Dan Pitt	722	27.2	+4.2
Labour	George Carr-Williamson	579	21.8	−2.7
Green	Mell Catori	314	11.8	+4.5
Liberal Democrats	Samuel Briggs	154	5.8	−3.6
Derbyshire Community Party	Cheryl Pidgeon	141	5.3	New
Majority		23	0.9	
Turnout		2,655	29.0	
Reform hold		Swing		

Horsley by-election: 20 January 2026
Party	Candidate	Votes	%	±%
Green	Lian Pizzey	1,341	43.6	+16.7
Reform	Juliette Stevens	1,091	35.5	+0.6
Conservative	Amanda Paget	426	13.9	−9.0
Labour	John Cowings	116	3.8	−6.5
Advance UK	Alex Stevenson	57	1.9	New
Liberal Democrats	Adrian Miller	43	1.4	−2.0
Majority		250	8.1	+0.1
Turnout		3,074	29.4	−9.5
Registered electors		10,455		
Green gain from Reform		Swing	8.5	

== See also ==
- 1973 Derbyshire County Council election
- 1977 Derbyshire County Council election
- 1981 Derbyshire County Council election
- 1985 Derbyshire County Council election
- 1989 Derbyshire County Council election
- 1993 Derbyshire County Council election
- 1997 Derbyshire County Council election
- 2001 Derbyshire County Council election
- 2005 Derbyshire County Council election (Note: boundary changes increased the number of seats by one.)
- 2009 Derbyshire County Council election
- 2013 Derbyshire County Council election (Note: boundary changes)
- 2017 Derbyshire County Council election
- 2021 Derbyshire County Council election
