= 2025 Derbyshire County Council election =

2025 UK local government election

- 1 May 2025

All 64 seats in the Derbyshire County Council 33 seats needed for a majority
- Registered: 101,080
- Turnout: 37.0%

	First party	Second party	Third party
Leader	Alan Graves	Barry Lewis (defeated)	Joan Dixon (defeated)
Party	Reform	Conservative	Labour
Leader's seat	Aston	Shirland & Wingerworth South	Bolsover
Last election	0 seats, 0.2%	45 seats, 47.8%	14 seats, 33.2%
Seats before	0	41	15
Seats won	42	12	3
Seat change	▲42	▼33	▼11
Popular vote	83,629	47,816	45,855
Percentage	36.8%	21.0%	20.2%
Swing	▲36.6 pp	▼26.8 pp	▼13.0 pp
	Fourth party	Fifth party	Sixth party
Leader	Ed Fordham	Gez Kinsella	N/A (Note: Two of the independent councillors formed the "Amber Valley Independents" group prior to the election, led by Philip Rose.)
Party	Liberal Democrats	Green	Independent
Leader's seat	Spire	South Belper & Holbrook
Last election	4 seats, 9.0%	1 seat, 7.6%	0 seats, 1.8%
Seats before	4	1	3
Seats won	3	2	2
Seat change	▼1	▲1	▲2
Popular vote	19,872	19,697	8,989
Percentage	8.7%	8.7%	4.0%
Swing	▼0.3 pp	▲1.1 pp	▲2.2 pp

- Composition of the council after the election
Leader before election
Barry Lewis
Conservative
Leader after election
Alan Graves
Reform

The 2025 Derbyshire County Council election took place on 1 May 2025 to elect members to Derbyshire County Council in Derbyshire, England. This was on the same day as other local elections All 64 seats were contested under new boundaries. The Conservatives had controlled the council since the 2017 election. At the election, Reform UK won 42 seats and gained control of the council. Alan Graves was elected leader of the council, while still also serving on Derby City Council.

== Previous council composition ==
After 2021 election		Before 2025 election	
Party	Seats	Party	Seats
Conservative	45	Conservative	41
Labour	14	Labour	15
Liberal Democrats	4	Liberal Democrats	4
Green	1	Green	1
Independent	0	Independent	3

=== Changes ===
- July 2022: Alan Griffiths (Conservative) dies - by-election held October 2022
- March 2023: Philip Rose (Conservative) and Alex Stevenson (Conservative) join Reform UK
- October 2022: Joel Bryan (Labour) gains by-election from Conservatives
- June 2023: Roger Redfern (Conservative) dies - by-election held August 2023
- August 2023: Alan Haynes (Labour) gains by-election from Conservatives
- May 2024: Nigel Gourlay (Conservative) suspended from party
- January 2025: Philip Rose (Reform UK) and Alex Stevenson (Reform UK) leave party to sit as independents (Note: Part of the Amber Valley Independents group, which is not registered as a party with the Electoral Commission)
- March 2025: Ruth George (Labour) leaves party to sit as an independent

== Summary ==
=== Overview ===
The election produced a large majority for Reform UK. Gaining seats across the county, and winning the popular vote by a wide margin, Reform UK made significant gains at the expense of both the Conservative and Labour groups.

The Conservatives experienced an electoral collapse, losing over half their vote from 2021, losing two-thirds of their seats. Their leader, Barry Lewis, who had been leader of the council since 2017, lost his seat.

The results were also punishing for Labour, losing eleven seats, and a significant portion of their vote from the previous election. They were wiped out in most districts by Reform UK and reduced to 3 seats, a record low for the party. The Labour leader, Joan Dixon, was defeated in her seat.

The Green Party won an additional seat in Amber Valley, and the Liberal Democrats lost a seat to finish on 3 - joint third with Labour. Two Independents were also elected, including former High Peak MP, Ruth George.

Reform UK had no councillors on the county council prior to the election. After the election, the new Reform UK group chose Alan Graves to be their leader; he was already the Reform UK group leader on Derby City Council. He was formally appointed as leader of the county council at the subsequent annual council meeting on 21 May 2025.

=== Election result ===
2025 Derbyshire County Council election
Party	Candidates	Seats	Gains	Losses	Net gain/loss	Seats %	Votes %	Votes	+/−
Reform	64	42	16	0	▲42	65.6	36.8	83,629	+36.6
Conservative	64	12	0	12	▼33	18.8	21.0	47,816	–26.8
Labour	64	3	0	6	▼11	4.7	20.2	45,855 (Note: Including 14,031 for Labour Co-op candidates)	–13.0
Liberal Democrats	56	3	1	1	▼1	4.7	8.7	19,872	–0.3
Green	53	2	0	0	▲1	3.1	8.7	19,697	+1.1
Independent	36	2	2	0	▲2	3.1	4.0	8,989	+2.2
Belper Independents	2	0	0	0	Steady	0.0	0.4	909	N/A
Chesterfield Independents	6	0	0	0	Steady	0.0	0.1	329	–0.2
TUSC	6	0	0	0	Steady	0.0	0.1	233	–0.1
Homeland	1	0	0	0	Steady	0.0	<0.1	84	N/A
National Front	1	0	0	0	Steady	0.0	<0.1	18	N/A

== Division results by district ==
=== Amber Valley ===
Amber Valley district summary
Party	Seats	+/-	Votes	%	+/-
Reform UK	7	▲7	13,049	35.0	N/A
Green	2	▲1	6,716	18.0	+5.0
Labour	1	▲1	6,150	16.5	–14.0
Conservative	0	▼9	7,061	18.9	–33.9
Liberal Democrats	0	Steady	1,897	5.1	+1.5
Independent	0	Steady	1,516	4.1	N/A
National Front	0	Steady	18	<0.1	N/A
Total	10	Steady	37,316	37.0	
Registered electors			101,080	–	

Division results

Alfreton and Somercotes
Party	Candidate	Votes	%	±%
Reform	Stuart Bent	1,476	50.3	N/A
Labour Co-op	Elaine Sherman	622	21.2	–14.6
Conservative	Steve Tomlinson	437	14.9	–36.1
Green	Russ Hubber	190	6.5	–3.1
Liberal Democrats	Paul Slater	134	4.6	+1.1
Independent	Michael Roe	40	1.4	N/A
Independent	Matt Gent	37	1.3	N/A
Majority		854	29.1	N/A
Turnout		2,940	28.4	
Registered electors		10,339		
Reform gain from Conservative				

Alport and Duffield
Party	Candidate	Votes	%
Green	Rachael Hatchett	1,914	44.4
Conservative	David Taylor*	1,067	24.7
Reform	James Kerry	905	21.0
Labour	Mark Spilsbury	278	6.4
Liberal Democrats	Barry Holliday	118	2.7
Independent	Leo Fox-White	19	0.4
Independent	Freddie Theobald	8	0.2
Independent	Paula Maude	3	0.1
Majority		847	19.7
Turnout		4,321	44.1
Registered electors		9,804	
Green win (new seat)			

Codnor, Aldercar, Langley Mill and Loscoe
Party	Candidate	Votes	%
Reform	Darran Furness	1,524	48.9
Labour	Paul Jones	526	16.9
Conservative	Jake Gilbert	477	15.3
Independent	Philip Rose*	260	8.3
Green	Angela Mayson	185	5.9
Liberal Democrats	Jeremy Miles	124	4.0
National Front	Timothy Knowles	18	0.6
Majority		998	32.0
Turnout		3,118	30.2
Registered electors		10,339	
Reform win (new seat)			

Heanor
Party	Candidate	Votes	%
Reform	Peter Mathews	1,131	36.7
Independent	Alex Stevenson*	746	24.2
Labour	Jason Lee Edge	461	15.0
Conservative	Mayo Oliver	365	11.8
Green	Sue Castillon	231	7.5
Liberal Democrats	Jerry Marler	149	4.8
Majority		385	12.5
Turnout		3,095	30.0
Registered electors		10,314	
Reform win (new seat)			

Horsley
Party	Candidate	Votes	%	±%
Reform	Richard Morgan	1,401	34.9	N/A
Green	Lian Pizzey	1,080	26.9	+16.1
Conservative	Amanda Paget	916	22.8	–40.1
Labour	John Cowings	413	10.3	–12.7
Liberal Democrats	Adrian Miller	136	3.4	+0.2
Independent	Zita Keats	67	1.7	N/A
Majority		321	8.0	N/A
Turnout		4,013	38.9	
Registered electors		10,307		
Reform gain from Conservative				

North Belper
Party	Candidate	Votes	%
Labour Co-op	Emma Monkman	983	23.9
Reform	Martyn Knight	946	23.0
Conservative	Michael Greatbatch	789	19.2
Belper Independents	Ben Bellamy	726	17.6
Green	Jamie Walls	576	14.0
Liberal Democrats	Mark Wilson	98	2.4
Majority		37	0.9
Turnout		4,124	44.1
Registered electors		9,352	
Labour Co-op win (new seat)			

Ripley East
Party	Candidate	Votes	%
Reform	Tony Wilson	1,505	44.0
Labour Co-op	Tony Holmes	802	23.5
Conservative	Steven Knee	597	17.5
Green	Mark Simmons	229	6.7
Liberal Democrats	Julie Hodgson	154	4.5
Independent	Malc Hibbard	66	1.9
Independent	Edwin Taylor	66	1.9
Majority		703	20.5
Turnout		3,427	32.7
Registered electors		10,473	
Reform win (new seat)			

Ripley West and Crich
Party	Candidate	Votes	%
Reform	Mark Chambers	1,656	35.3
Conservative	Paul Moss*	1,093	23.3
Labour	Amina Burslem	840	17.9
Liberal Democrats	Kate Smith	599	12.8
Green	Sally Lowick	419	8.9
Independent	Edward Oakenfull	56	1.2
Independent	Guy Liggett	33	0.7
Majority		563	12.0
Turnout		4,702	43.4
Registered electors		10,836	
Reform win (new seat)			

South Belper and Holbrook
Party	Candidate	Votes	%
Green	Gez Kinsella*	1,805	44.8
Reform	Martin Carnell	951	23.6
Conservative	Matt Murray	515	12.8
Labour Co-op	Mary Dwyer	486	12.1
Belper Independents	Rob Marshall	183	4.5
Liberal Democrats	Richard Salmon	88	2.2
Majority		854	21.2
Turnout		4,030	43.3
Registered electors		9,312	
Green win (new seat)			

Swanwick and Riddings
Party	Candidate	Votes	%
Reform	Charlotte Gates	1,554	43.2
Conservative	Charlotte Cupit*	805	22.4
Labour Co-op	James Butler	739	20.5
Liberal Democrats	Malvin Trigg	297	8.3
Independent	Alan Abernethy	115	3.2
Green	Dave Hatchett	87	2.4
Majority		749	20.8
Turnout		3,599	36.0
Registered electors		9,984	
Reform win (new seat)			

=== Bolsover ===
Bolsover district summary
Party	Seats	+/-	Votes	%	+/-
Reform UK	6	▲6	10,810	54.0	N/A
Labour	0	▼3	4,241	21.2	–21.9
Conservative	0	▼3	2,682	13.4	–28.0
Green	0	Steady	979	4.9	+3.7
Independent	0	Steady	698	3.5	–5.0
Liberal Democrats	0	Steady	305	1.5	–2.2
TUSC	0	Steady	233	1.2	–1.0
Homeland	0	Steady	84	0.4	N/A
Total	6	Steady	20,032	32.0	
Registered electors			62,798	–	

Division results

Barlborough and Clowne
Party	Candidate	Votes	%	±%
Reform	Kevin Harper	2,008	52.7	N/A
Labour	Dawn Walton	743	19.5	–20.2
Conservative	David Dixon	666	17.5	–38.1
Green	Helen Davies	181	4.8	N/A
Liberal Democrats	Steven Raison	126	3.3	–1.4
Independent	Pamela Windley	55	1.4	N/A
TUSC	Dean Eggleston	31	0.8	N/A
Majority		1,265	33.2	N/A
Turnout		3,818	35.5	
Registered electors		10,748		
Reform gain from Conservative				

Bolsover
Party	Candidate	Votes	%
Reform	Carol Wood	1,641	50.1
Labour Co-op	Joan Dixon*	871	26.6
Conservative	Will Fletcher	372	11.4
Green	Mike Noble	135	4.1
Liberal Democrats	Dorothy Dobbs	108	3.3
Homeland	Tom Batten	84	2.6
TUSC	Jon Dale	62	1.9
Majority		770	23.5
Turnout		3,279	32.5
Registered electors		10,101	
Reform win (new seat)			

Elmton with Creswell and Whitwell
Party	Candidate	Votes	%
Reform	Roy Hallett	1,708	51.9
Labour Co-op	Mick Yates*	729	22.1
Independent	Cris Carr	397	12.1
Conservative	Natalie Hoy*	257	7.8
Green	Joanna Collins	176	5.3
TUSC	Elaine Evans	27	0.8
Majority		979	29.8
Turnout		3,309	32.7
Registered electors		10,110	
Reform win (new seat)			

Hardwick
Party	Candidate	Votes	%
Reform	David Harvey	1,925	55.5
Labour	Clive Moesby	772	22.3
Conservative	Sharon Coleman	416	12.0
Green	Jill Brooks	201	5.8
Independent	Leonard Walker	129	3.7
TUSC	Robert Smith	26	0.7
Majority		1,153	33.2
Turnout		3,479	32.8
Registered electors		10,611	
Reform win (new seat)			

Shirebrook and Pleasley
Party	Candidate	Votes	%	±%
Reform	Sarah Reaney	1,733	58.2	N/A
Labour	Christine Dale*	666	22.4	–33.6
Conservative	David Taylor	239	8.0	–25.1
Independent	Helen Oakton	117	3.9	N/A
Green	Tony Waite	94	3.2	N/A
Liberal Democrats	Peter Shepherd	71	2.4	–4.3
TUSC	Ronnie Rogers	59	2.0	–2.2
Majority		1,067	35.8	N/A
Turnout		2,986	28.0	
Registered electors		10,647		
Reform gain from Labour				

South Normanton and Pinxton
Party	Candidate	Votes	%	±%
Reform	Nephi Somerville	1,795	56.0	N/A
Conservative	Julian Siddle*	732	22.8	–24.2
Labour	Alex Crainic	460	14.3	–26.1
Green	Ian Mason	192	6.0	N/A
TUSC	Brian Loader	28	0.9	–0.6
Majority		1,063	33.2	N/A
Turnout		3,215	30.4	
Registered electors		10,581		
Reform gain from Conservative				

=== Chesterfield ===
Chesterfield district summary
Party	Seats	+/-	Votes	%	+/-
Reform UK	6	▲6	9,589	35.7	N/A
Liberal Democrats	2	▼1	5,491	20.5	–4.2
Labour	0	▼6	6,365	23.7	–14.5
Conservative	0	Steady	2,233	8.3	–17.2
Green	0	Steady	2,093	7.8	+4.7
Independent	0	Steady	728	2.7	–3.3
Chesterfield Ind.	0	Steady	329	1.2	–1.3
Total	8	▼1	26,828	33.8	
Registered electors			79,509	–	

Division results

Brimington
Party	Candidate	Votes	%	±%
Reform	Richard Smith	1,240	44.3	N/A
Labour Co-op	Dean Collins*	810	29.0	–27.1
Liberal Democrats	Stephen Hartley	273	9.8	+3.3
Conservative	Wendy Tinley	210	7.5	–21.1
Green	Janet Ratcliffe	158	5.6	N/A
Independent	Kieron Payne	47	1.7	N/A
Independent	Carl Chambers	30	1.1	–4.8
Independent	Cheryl Jackson	29	1.0	N/A
Majority		430	15.3	N/A
Turnout		2,802	30.3	
Registered electors		9,244		
Reform gain from Labour Co-op				

Dunston
Party	Candidate	Votes	%
Reform	Joss Barnes	1,296	46.7
Labour Co-op	Jean Innes*	744	26.8
Liberal Democrats	Katherine Hollingworth	237	8.5
Conservative	Ian Jerram	224	8.1
Green	David Fox	189	6.8
Chesterfield Ind.	Kris Stone	88	3.2
Majority		552	19.9
Turnout		2,780	29.8
Registered electors		9,323	
Reform win (new seat)			

Hasland and Rother
Party	Candidate	Votes	%
Reform	Lewis Whitbread	1,285	37.2
Labour	Lisa Blackmore	837	24.2
Green	Darren Yates	747	21.6
Conservative	Linda Rowley	319	9.2
Liberal Democrats	Maggie Kellman	206	6.0
Chesterfield Ind.	Sue Armenante	59	1.7
Majority		448	13
Turnout		3,457	32.2
Registered electors		10,730	
Reform win (new seat)			

Linacre and Loundsley Green
Party	Candidate	Votes	%
Reform	Alex Millward	1,141	29.0
Liberal Democrats	Paul Niblock*	948	24.1
Labour Co-op	Elizabeth Smith	890	22.6
Conservative	Sanjoy Sen	633	16.1
Green	Katherine Noble	250	7.4
Chesterfield Ind.	David Jones	69	1.8
Majority		193	4.9
Turnout		3,937	39.9
Registered electors		9,848	
Reform win (new seat)			

Spire
Party	Candidate	Votes	%	±%
Liberal Democrats	Ed Fordham*	1,248	34.9	+16.4
Reform	Caz Smyth	992	27.8	N/A
Labour Co-op	Ludwig Ramsey*	774	21.7	–25.7
Conservative	Swaroop Pillai	269	7.5	–18.5
Green	Vicky Noble	250	7.0	–1.1
Chesterfield Ind.	Alan Heathcote	41	1.1	N/A
Majority		256	7.1	N/A
Turnout		3,580	36.4	
Registered electors		9,822		
Liberal Democrats gain from Labour Co-op				

Staveley
Party	Candidate	Votes	%	±%
Reform	Dawn Abbott	1,183	41.2	N/A
Labour Co-op	Anne-Frances Hayes*	760	26.5	–4.6
Independent	Paul Mann	300	10.4	–19.0
Independent	Mick Bagshaw	257	8.9	–11.9
Conservative	Andy Jervis	146	5.1	–13.6
Green	Louis Hollingworth	124	4.3	N/A
Liberal Democrats	Paul Jacobs	103	3.6	N/A
Majority		423	14.7	N/A
Turnout		2,880	28.9	
Registered electors		9,960		
Reform gain from Labour				

Staveley North and Whittington
Party	Candidate	Votes	%	±%
Reform	Mark Cliff	1,324	39.5	N/A
Liberal Democrats	Barry Bingham*	1,200	35.8	–17.6
Labour	Allan Ogle	525	15.7	–9.1
Green	Simon Swift	112	3.3	N/A
Conservative	Carolyn Renwick	106	3.2	–15.5
Independent	Martin Hibbert	65	1.9	N/A
Chesterfield Ind.	Rose Clark	21	0.6	–2.5
Majority		124	3.7	N/A
Turnout		3,361	32.6	
Registered electors		10,306		
Reform gain from Liberal Democrats				

Walton, Brampton and Boythorpe
Party	Candidate	Votes	%
Liberal Democrats	Tom Snowdon	1,276	31.5
Reform	Helen Ward	1,128	27.9
Labour	Alexandra Fawbert	1,025	25.3
Conservative	Jacob Rodgers	306	7.6
Green	David Wadsworth	263	6.5
Chesterfield Ind.	Adele Downer	51	1.3
Majority		148	3.7
Turnout		4,058	39.4
Registered electors		10,276	
Liberal Democrats win (new seat)			

=== Derbyshire Dales ===
Derbyshire Dales district summary
Party	Seats	+/-	Votes	%	+/-
Conservative	3	▼2	7,055	27.1	–22.7
Reform UK	2	▲2	7,477	28.7	N/A
Liberal Democrats	1	Steady	4,590	17.6	–1.5
Labour	0	Steady	4,226	16.2	–3.7
Green	0	Steady	2,546	9.8	–0.6
Independent	0	Steady	136	0.5	–0.3
Total	6	Steady	26,170	44.7	
Registered electors			58,589	–	

Division results

Ashbourne South
Party	Candidate	Votes	%
Conservative	Steve Bull*	1,644	39.0
Reform	Jeremy Ruse	1,327	31.5
Liberal Democrats	Robin Shirtcliffe	516	12.2
Labour	Alexy King	359	8.5
Green	Georgina Blair	234	5.6
Independent	Gavin Webb	136	3.2
Majority		317	7.5
Turnout		4,224	44.5
Registered electors		9,487	
Conservative win (new seat)			

Bakewell
Party	Candidate	Votes	%	±%
Conservative	Alasdair Sutton*	1,494	29.8	–23.0
Reform	Max Bethell	1,223	24.4	N/A
Labour Co-op	Diane Fletcher	1,211	24.1	–23.1
Green	Neil Buttle	619	12.3	N/A
Liberal Democrats	Claire Cadogan	472	9.4	N/A
Majority		271	5.4	–0.2
Turnout		5,030	44.6	
Registered electors		11,270		
Conservative hold				

Derwent Valley
Party	Candidate	Votes	%	±%
Conservative	Susan Hobson*	1,307	30.9	–23.9
Reform	Kate Burnett	1,130	26.8	N/A
Liberal Democrats	Ian Barfield	841	19.9	–25.3
Labour	Trevor Page	519	12.3	N/A
Green	Laura Mellstrom	426	10.1	N/A
Majority		177	4.1	–5.5
Turnout		4,231	45.3	
Registered electors		9,337		
Conservative hold				

Dovedale and Ashbourne North
Party	Candidate	Votes	%
Reform	Nick Adams	1,517	35.8
Conservative	Stuart Lees	1,270	30.0
Liberal Democrats	Peter Dobbs	540	12.8
Green	John Hill	454	10.7
Labour	Lucy Peacock	454	10.7
Majority		247	5.8
Turnout		4,242	44.3
Registered electors		9,564	
Reform win (new seat)			

Matlock
Party	Candidate	Votes	%	±%
Liberal Democrats	Sue Burfoot*	2,007	49.4	–8.4
Reform	Juliette Stevens	974	24.0	N/A
Labour	Sarah Halliwell	439	10.8	–4.5
Conservative	Gareth Gee	399	9.8	–11.4
Green	Nicola Peltell	244	6.0	+0.2
Majority		1,033	25.4	–11.2
Turnout		4,069	43.8	
Registered electors		9,290		
Liberal Democrats hold				

Wirksworth
Party	Candidate	Votes	%	±%
Reform	Adrian Hunter	1,306	29.9	N/A
Labour	Richard Oliver	1,244	28.4	–10.4
Conservative	Dermot Murphy*	941	21.5	–20.8
Green	John Green	569	13.0	+2.6
Liberal Democrats	Jason Knighton	314	7.2	+3.3
Majority		62	1.5	N/A
Turnout		4,383	45.5	
Registered electors		9,641		
Reform gain from Conservative				

=== Erewash ===
Erewash district summary
Party	Seats	+/-	Votes	%	+/-
Reform UK	6	▲6	12,315	40.9	+40.1
Conservative	3	▼6	8,068	26.8	–27.9
Labour	0	Steady	5,705	19.0	–10.8
Liberal Democrats	0	Steady	2,288	7.6	+0.5
Green	0	Steady	1,698	5.6	–2.1
Total	9	Steady	30,074		

Division results

Breadsall and West Hallam
Party	Candidate	Votes	%	±%
Conservative	Carol Hart*	1,437	41.4	–15.8
Reform	Ian McLeod	1,064	30.6	+28.4
Labour	Neil Barnes	442	12.7	–4.2
Liberal Democrats	Robert Mee	321	9.2	–14.5
Green	Kendal Greaves	209	6.0	N/A
Majority		373	10.8	–22.7
Turnout		3,473		
Conservative hold		Swing	▼22.1	

Breaston
Party	Candidate	Votes	%	±%
Reform	John Lawson	1,512	37.4	N/A
Conservative	Garry Hickton*	1,211	30.0	–29.7
Labour	Greg Maskalick	619	15.3	–3.5
Green	Ann Mills	427	10.6	–10.9
Liberal Democrats	Alexander Richards	269	6.7	N/A
Majority		301	7.4	N/A
Turnout		4,038		
Reform gain from Conservative				

Ilkeston Central
Party	Candidate	Votes	%
Reform	Richard Hatfield	1,914	55.3
Labour	Josy Hare	607	17.5
Conservative	Robert Flatley*	555	16.0
Green	Heather Hierons	210	6.1
Liberal Democrats	David Dodson	178	5.1
Majority		1,307	37.7
Turnout		3,464	
Reform win (new seat)			

Ilkeston North
Party	Candidate	Votes	%
Reform	Dan Price	1,814	55.8
Labour	Linda Burns	569	17.5
Conservative	Michael White	469	14.4
Green	Lauren McKie	198	6.1
Liberal Democrats	Angela Togni	198	6.1
Majority		1,255	38.6
Turnout		3,248	
Reform win (new seat)			

Ilkeston South and Kirk Hallam
Party	Candidate	Votes	%
Reform	Simon Mabbott	1,405	56.1
Labour	James Dawson	404	16.1
Conservative	Kevin Miller	386	15.4
Green	Deena Draycott	199	8.0
Liberal Democrats	Jennifer Smith	109	4.4
Majority		1001	40
Turnout		2,503	
Reform win (new seat)			

Long Eaton North
Party	Candidate	Votes	%
Reform	Jack Bradley	1,121	35.8
Labour	George Carr-Williamson	767	24.5
Conservative	Bethan Eddy	720	23.0
Liberal Democrats	Jane Oseman	295	9.4
Green	Graham Tavener	228	7.3
Majority		354	
Turnout		3,131	
Reform win (new seat)			

Long Eaton South
Party	Candidate	Votes	%
Reform	Jodie Brown	1,115	37.0
Labour Co-op	Joel Bryan	771	25.6
Conservative	Lorna Maginnis	664	22.0
Liberal Democrats	Rachel Allen	239	7.9
Green	Mell Catori	227	7.5
Majority		344	11.4
Turnout		3,016	
Reform win (new seat)			

Sandiacre
Party	Candidate	Votes	%	±%
Conservative	Wayne Major*	1,298	42.8	–19.2
Reform	Dan Naylor	1,059	34.9	+33.1
Labour	Daist Forster	495	16.3	–10.3
Liberal Democrats	Kristopher Watts	181	6.0	+2.4
Majority		239	7.9	–27.6
Turnout		3,033		
Conservative hold		Swing	▼26.2	

Sawley
Party	Candidate	Votes	%	±%
Conservative	Paul Maginnis	1,328	31.9	–21.7
Reform	Ian Peatfield	1,311	31.5	+29.2
Labour	Dave Doyle	1,031	24.7	–3.5
Liberal Democrats	James Archer	498	11.9	–0.1
Majority		17	0.4	–25.0
Turnout		4,168		
Conservative hold		Swing	▼25.5	

=== High Peak ===
High Peak district summary
Party	Seats	+/-	Votes	%	+/-
Conservative	3	▼1	7,241	24.2	–17.6
Reform UK	2	▲2	7,969	26.6	+26.4
Labour	2	▼2	7,442	24.9	–18.2
Independent	1	▲1	2,737	9.2	+8.2
Green	0	Steady	3,039	10.2	+2.8
Liberal Democrats	0	Steady	1,480	4.9	–1.4
Total	8	Steady	29,908	41.0	
Registered electors			73,038	–	

Division results

Buxton North and East
Party	Candidate	Votes	%	±%
Reform	Melandra Smith	1,075	34.5	+32.5
Labour	Rachael Quinn	942	30.2	–12.1
Conservative	Frederick Walton	566	18.1	–30.7
Green	Lisa Adamson	349	11.2	+5.5
Liberal Democrats	Louise Glasscoe	187	6.0	+4.8
Majority		133	4.3	N/A
Turnout		3,131	34.9	
Registered electors		8,980		
Reform gain from Conservative		Swing	▲22.3	

Buxton South and West
Party	Candidate	Votes	%
Conservative	Linda Grooby*	1,311	33.8
Reform	Nigel Penn	1,118	28.9
Labour	Martin Willey	879	22.7
Green	Paul Bohan	333	8.6
Liberal Democrats	Jane Simm	158	4.1
Independent	Charles Lloyd	75	1.9
Majority		193	5.0
Turnout		3,878	43.7
Registered electors		8,865	
Conservative win (new seat)			

Chapel and Hope Valley
Party	Candidate	Votes	%	±%
Conservative	Nigel Gourlay*	1,432	29.9	–17.0
Reform	Michael Eyre	1,319	27.5	N/A
Labour	Sally de Pee	969	20.2	–0.3
Green	Jason Adshead	937	19.5	–1.5
Liberal Democrats	Thomas Vaughan	137	2.9	+0.5
Majority		113	2.4	–23.5
Turnout		4,802	46.4	
Registered electors		10,342		
Conservative hold				

Etherow
Party	Candidate	Votes	%	±%
Reform	Jason Isherwood	1,069	40.2	N/A
Labour Co-op	Lucy Hudson	757	28.5	–18.7
Conservative	Tony Brookes	552	20.8	–21.7
Green	Eileen Raynolds	279	10.5	+3.7
Majority		312	11.7	N/A
Turnout		2,661	28.8	
Registered electors		9,244		
Reform gain from Labour		Swing		

Glossop North
Party	Candidate	Votes	%
Conservative	Jean Wharmby*	1,083	32.7
Labour	Stewart Gardner	1,023	30.9
Reform	Lee Smith	744	22.5
Green	Linda Walker	303	9.1
Liberal Democrats	Stephen Worrall	159	4.8
Majority		60	1.8
Turnout		3,321	41.3
Registered electors		8,016	
Conservative win (new seat)			

Glossop South
Party	Candidate	Votes	%
Labour Co-op	Damien Greenhalgh*	1,211	33.1
Conservative	Adie Hopkinson	1,011	27.6
Reform	Phil Hesketh	928	25.3
Green	Peter Allen	380	10.4
Liberal Democrats	Jonathan Parrott	131	3.6
Majority		200	5.5
Turnout		3,672	40.4
Registered electors		9,071	
Labour Co-op win (new seat)			

New Mills and Hayfield
Party	Candidate	Votes	%
Labour Co-op	Anne Clarke*	1,493	39.0
Reform	Antony Prodromis	1,005	26.3
Conservative	Virginia Priestley	501	13.1
Liberal Democrats	Charles Jevon	485	12.7
Green	Jeremy Wight	340	8.9
Majority		488	12.8
Turnout		3,833	39.7
Registered electors		9,638	
Labour Co-op win (new seat)			

Whaley Bridge
Party	Candidate	Votes	%	±%
Independent	Ruth George*	2,662	57.0	N/A
Conservative	Jacky Sidebottom	785	16.8	–21.5
Reform	Luke Norton	711	15.2	N/A
Liberal Democrats	David Lomax	223	4.8	–2.1
Labour	Jo Taylor	168	3.6	–48.3
Green	Matthew Firth	118	2.5	–0.3
Majority		1,877	40.2	N/A
Turnout		4,674	52.6	
Registered electors		8,882		
Independent gain from Labour				

=== North East Derbyshire ===
North East Derbyshire district summary
Party	Seats	+/-	Votes	%	+/-
Reform UK	6	▲6	11,065	36.8	+36.6
Conservative	2	▼5	7,915	26.3	–28.3
Labour	0	▼1	6,081	20.2	–12.3
Green	0	Steady	2,626	8.7	+4.4
Independent	0	Steady	1,655	5.5	+4.7
Liberal Democrats	0	Steady	753	2.5	–5.2
Total	8	Steady	30,168	36.6	
Registered electors			82,387	–	

Division results

Clay Cross and Tupton
Party	Candidate	Votes	%
Reform	Stephen Reed	1,353	36.9
Labour	John Cooper	747	20.4
Conservative	Yvonne Shaw	726	19.8
Independent	Ross Shipman	647	17.6
Green	Kieran Harley	194	5.3
Majority		606	16.5
Turnout		3,674	34.1
Registered electors		10,781	
Reform win (new seat)			

Dronfield and Unstone
Party	Candidate	Votes	%
Conservative	Alex Dale*	1,641	39.0
Reform	Louis Hutchinson	1,023	24.3
Labour	Jonathan Williams	756	18.0
Independent	Michael Dungworth	295	7.0
Liberal Democrats	Simon Temple	288	6.8
Green	Naila Dracup	204	4.8
Majority		618	14.7
Turnout		4,215	39.0
Registered electors		10,819	
Conservative win (new seat)			

Dronfield Woodhouse and Walton
Party	Candidate	Votes	%
Conservative	Angelique Foster*	1,749	37.1
Reform	Roger Hall	1,479	31.4
Labour	Ross Griffin	813	17.3
Green	Gill Mellor	316	6.7
Liberal Democrats	Martin Wilcock	305	6.5
Independent	Camille Ramshaw	51	1.1
Majority		270	5.7
Turnout		4,731	46.3
Registered electors		10,229	
Conservative win (new seat)			

Eckington and Coal Aston
Party	Candidate	Votes	%
Reform	Jamie Hodgson	1,429	36.9
Conservative	Mark Foster*	1,150	29.7
Labour	Steve Pickering	740	19.1
Independent	Jackie Foster	229	5.9
Green	David Kesteven	220	5.7
Liberal Democrats	Henry Jebb	82	2.1
Independent	June Hancock	21	0.5
Majority		279	7.2
Turnout		3,876	38.1
Registered electors		10,178	
Reform win (new seat)			

Killamarsh and Renishaw
Party	Candidate	Votes	%
Reform	David Elsdon	1,255	46.1
Conservative	Adrian Platts	700	25.7
Labour	Carol Lacey	543	19.9
Green	Teddy Adlington-Stringer	125	4.6
Liberal Democrats	Roger Shelley	78	2.9
Independent	Keith Windley	24	0.9
Majority		555	20.4
Turnout		2,730	30.5
Registered electors		8,932	
Reform win (new seat)			

North Wingfield, Pilsley and Morton
Party	Candidate	Votes	%
Reform	Darren Muizelaar	1,436	43.2
Labour	Kevin Gillott*	1,278	38.5
Conservative	Richard Embrey	292	8.8
Green	Rowan Adlington	193	5.8
Independent	David Hancock	122	3.7
Majority		148	4.5
Turnout		3,326	33.3
Registered electors		9,980	
Reform win (new seat)			

Shirland and Wingerworth South
Party	Candidate	Votes	%
Reform	Paul Parkin	1,422	32.9
Conservative	Barry Lewis*	1,160	26.9
Green	Frank Adlington-Stringer	1,134	26.3
Labour	Bob Cushing	461	10.7
Independent	Heather Liggett	143	3.3
Majority		262	6.1
Turnout		4,335	39.2
Registered electors		11,068	
Reform win (new seat)			

Sutton
Party	Candidate	Votes	%	±%
Reform	Robert Reaney	1,668	51.0	N/A
Labour	Catherine Tite	743	22.7	–19.3
Conservative	Dave Sankey	497	15.2	–31.6
Green	John Harris	240	7.3	+1.4
Independent	Anthony Bingham	123	3.8	N/A
Majority		925	28.3	N/A
Turnout		3,281	31.5	
Registered electors		10,400		
Reform gain from Conservative				

=== South Derbyshire ===
South Derbyshire district summary
Party	Seats	+/-	Votes	%	+/-
Reform UK	7	▲7	11,355	41.9	+41.4
Conservative	1	▼8	5,581	20.6	–35.1
Independent	1	▲1	1,519	5.6	+2.6
Labour	0	Steady	5,645	20.9	–8.0
Liberal Democrats	0	Steady	2,968	11.0	+7.8
Total	9	Steady	27,138	31.4	
Registered electors			86,354	–	

Division results

Aston
Party	Candidate	Votes	%	±%
Reform	Alan Graves	1,030	38.5	+35.2
Conservative	Daniel Corbin	824	30.8	–23.0
Labour	Ed Green	602	22.5	–9.8
Liberal Democrats	Alex Davenport	221	8.3	+4.9
Majority		206	7.7	N/A
Turnout		2,683	31.9	
Registered electors		8,405		
Reform gain from Conservative		Swing	▲29.1	

Etwall and Findern
Party	Candidate	Votes	%	±%
Conservative	Martyn Ford*	1,005	34.6	–27.9
Reform	Tom Handy	952	32.8	N/A
Labour	Alan Jones	542	18.7	–1.2
Liberal Democrats	Jayne Davies	407	14.0	+8.9
Majority		53	1.8	–40.8
Turnout		2,914	30.6	
Registered electors		9,528		
Conservative hold				

Hilton
Party	Candidate	Votes	%	±%
Reform	Sam Redfern	1,424	41.5	N/A
Liberal Democrats	Grahame Andrew	1,071	31.2	+22.2
Conservative	Andrew Kirke	556	16.2	–48.9
Labour	Joe Coney	383	11.2	–6.5
Majority		353	10.3	N/A
Turnout		3,442	33.0	
Registered electors		10,428		
Reform gain from Conservative				

Linton
Party	Candidate	Votes	%	±%
Independent	Amy Wheelton	1,519	46.5	+23.1
Reform	Ian Baker	1,028	31.5	N/A
Labour	Marie Haywood	407	12.5	–18.1
Conservative	Matthew Gotheridge	258	7.9	–38.0
Liberal Democrats	Russell Eagling	52	1.6	N/A
Majority		491	15.0	N/A
Turnout		3,267	37.1	
Registered electors		8,805		
Independent gain from Conservative				

Melbourne and Woodville
Party	Candidate	Votes	%
Reform	Charlotte Hill	1,508	44.1
Labour	Andy Dawson	899	26.3
Conservative	David Muller*	671	19.6
Liberal Democrats	John James	338	9.9
Majority		609	17.8
Turnout		3,433	34.6
Registered electors		9,911	
Reform win (new seat)			

Repton and Stenson
Party	Candidate	Votes	%
Reform	Matthew Benfield	1,247	37.2
Conservative	Neil Atkin	898	26.8
Labour	Lakhvinder Singh	767	22.9
Liberal Democrats	Stephen Hardwick	444	13.2
Majority		349	10.4
Turnout		3,369	32.8
Registered electors		10,270	
Reform win (new seat)			

Swadlincote East
Party	Candidate	Votes	%
Reform	Martin Bromley	1,394	54.3
Labour	Angela Archer	632	24.6
Conservative	Jacque Geddes	403	15.7
Liberal Democrats	Jonathan Panes	140	5.4
Majority		762	29.7
Turnout		2,573	27.0
Registered electors		9,540	
Reform win (new seat)			

Swadlincote South
Party	Candidate	Votes	%	±%
Reform	Paul Oxberry	1,342	48.2	N/A
Labour	Alan Hayes	723	26.0	–6.4
Conservative	Stuart Swann*	575	20.6	–38.6
Liberal Democrats	James Laing	146	5.2	N/A
Majority		619	22.2	N/A
Turnout		2,792	29.1	
Registered electors		9,585		
Reform gain from Conservative				

Swadlincote West
Party	Candidate	Votes	%
Reform	Joseph Turrell	1,430	53.8
Labour	Richard Haywood	690	25.9
Conservative	David Bell	391	14.7
Liberal Democrats	Tilo Scheel	149	5.6
Majority		740	27.8
Turnout		2,665	27.0
Registered electors		9,882	
Reform win (new seat)			

== By-elections ==
=== Long Eaton North ===
Long Eaton North by-election: 2 December 2025
Party	Candidate	Votes	%	±%
Reform	Owen Ferron	745	28.1	−7.7
Conservative	Dan Pitt	722	27.2	+4.2
Labour	George Carr-Williamson	579	21.8	−2.7
Green	Mell Catori	314	11.8	+4.5
Liberal Democrats	Samuel Briggs	154	5.8	−3.6
Derbyshire Community Party	Cheryl Pidgeon	141	5.3	New
Majority		23	0.9	
Turnout		2655	29.0	
Registered electors				
Reform hold		Swing		

=== Horsley ===
Horsley by-election: 20 January 2026
Party	Candidate	Votes	%	±%
Green	Lian Pizzey	1,341	43.6	+16.7
Reform	Juliette Stevens	1,091	35.5	+0.6
Conservative	Amanda Paget	426	13.9	−8.9
Labour	John Cowings	116	3.8	−6.5
Advance UK	Alex Stevenson	57	1.9	New
Liberal Democrats	Adrian Miller	43	1.4	−2.0
Majority		250	8.1	
Turnout		3,074	29.4	−9.5
Registered electors		10,455		
Green gain from Reform		Swing		

A by-election was called following the resignation of Reform councillor, Richard Morgan. The Green Party win was the first occasion that they had gained a seat from Reform anywhere.
