= Andrew Bingham =

British politician (born 1962)

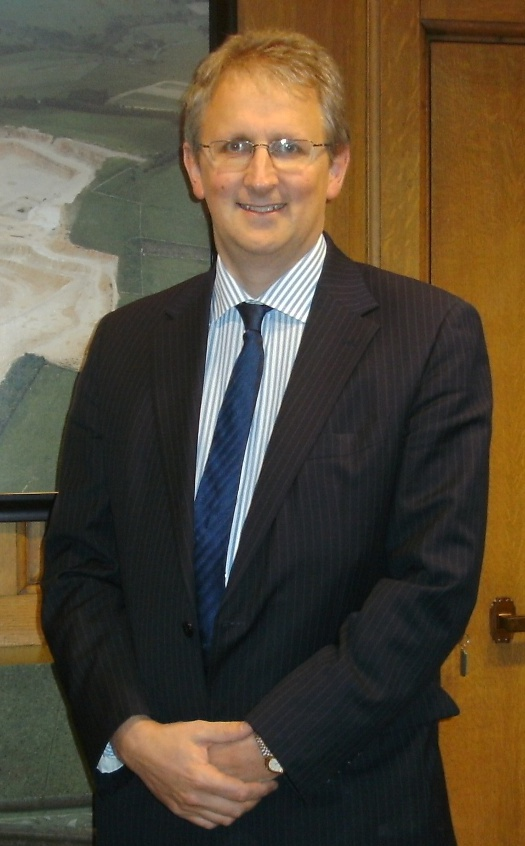
- Bingham in 2010

Parliamentary Private Secretary to the Secretary of State for International Development
- In office 29 May 2015 – 13 July 2016
- Prime Minister: David Cameron
- Preceded by: Julian Smith
- Succeeded by: Kelly Tolhurst

Member of Parliament for High Peak
- In office 6 May 2010 – 3 May 2017
- Preceded by: Tom Levitt
- Succeeded by: Ruth George
- Majority: 4,894 (9.6%)

Personal details
- Born: 23 June 1962 (age 64) Buxton, Derbyshire, England
- Party: Conservative
- Education: University of Derby
- Profession: Businessman
- Website: parliament..andrew-bingham

Andrew Russell Bingham (born 23 June 1962) is a British Conservative Party politician and former Member of Parliament (MP). He was first elected as the MP for High Peak in Derbyshire at the 2010 general election, gaining the seat from Labour. Bingham was appointed the Parliamentary private secretary to Minister of State for the Armed Forces Mark Francois MP in July 2014. He lost his seat to the Labour candidate, Ruth George, at the 2017 general election.

Since November 2017, Bingham has been the head of the Government Car Service, part of the Cabinet Office based in London.

== Early life ==
Bingham was born in Buxton and was raised there before his family moved to Chapel-en-le-Frith. He attended Long Lane Comprehensive School (now known as Chapel-en-le-Frith High School). He worked as a Director in his father's business before being elected to parliament, supplying engineering equipment to companies across the High Peak and North West England.

== Political career ==
Bingham was first elected onto High Peak Borough Council in the 1999 district council elections, and was Councillor for Chapel West ward until the 2011 local elections. When the Conservatives gained control of the council in 2007 he became executive member for Social and Community Development.

After losing by 735 votes to the incumbent Labour MP Tom Levitt at the 2005 general election, Bingham regained the High Peak seat for the Conservatives at the 2010 general election. He gave his maiden speech in the House of Commons on 8 June 2010, during which he claimed to have the most beautiful constituency in the UK. In 2010 he was appointed to the Work and Pensions Select Committee.

Bingham opposed the government's ultimately successful legislation to introduce same-sex marriage. He stated that he knew his decision would 'upset' people but "felt after much thought and consideration that marriage as the union of one man and woman has existed for thousands of years and [he] couldn't support the changes proposed".

In July 2014, Bingham was appointed to the Government, to be Parliamentary private secretary to the newly promoted Minister of State for the Armed Forces Mark Francois. Before becoming bound by the Ministerial Code, as a Parliamentary Private Secretary in the Ministry of Defence, Mr Bingham's various rebellions against the Government once led to one national newspaper to describe him as a 'serial rebel'. He was re-elected for his constituency in the 2015 general election with 45% of votes. Following the 2015 general election he was appointed as PPS to Justine Greening, Secretary of State for International Development.

Bingham supported Brexit in the 2016 European Union Referendum.

== Campaigns ==
=== Mottram–Tintwistle Bypass ===
Since being elected Bingham has been involved with the campaign for a bypass of the village of Tintwistle in his constituency (commonly known as the A57/A628 bypass, or the Mottram–Tintwistle Bypass). He met campaigners for the bypass, raised the issue at PMQs, held a parliamentary debate about the bypass, and secured a visit by the Transport Minister, Norman Baker.

Since the Minister's visit, Bingham has organised a number of meetings with a group of key stakeholders to find a way forward, as well as continuing to raise the issue of the bypass with Ministers in the House of Commons.

=== Corbar Birth Centre ===
In May 2011, Derbyshire County NHS announced a review of the future of Corbar Birth Centre in Buxton. Bingham spoke out in support of the birth centre and joined the campaign to save it. Amongst other things, Bingham raised the issue at PMQs and organised an action day across the constituency in conjunction with the National Childbirth Trust.

Despite this, members of the NHS Derby City and NHS Derbyshire County cluster voted unanimously to close Corbar, a decision which Bingham described as 'misinformed, misguided and wrong'.

=== East Midlands Ambulance Service ===
In the summer of 2012, East Midlands Ambulance Service (EMAS) announced plans to close the ambulance stations in Buxton and New Mills and replace them with a central hub in Chesterfield. Bingham met with EMAS to put his concerns to them and to state the case for an extra hub in the High Peak. A vocal opponent of the EMAS proposals, Bingham consistently warned about the length of the journey from the proposed central hub in Chesterfield, saying he had 'grave concerns' that the plans would put lives at risk. He also secured a short debate about the EMAS proposals in the House of Commons chamber, during which he re-stated his opposition to the plans.

In March 2013, EMAS announced that they had agreed to retain an ambulance station in the High Peak, a decision which Bingham cautiously welcomed.

=== Rural broadband ===
Bingham has also campaigned for better access to broadband in rural parts of his constituency, which he has said would benefit small businesses and the rural economy. He has spoken in various debates on the issue in the House of Commons, and in the course of one of them said that he regards broadband as the 'fourth utility' "as it is vital that businesses have it".

=== New health facility for Buxton ===
Before his defeat in 2017, Bingham had been working on his idea for a new hospital for Buxton on the site of the old bottling plant for Buxton Water, rendered derelict when Nestlé opened a new plant outside the centre of the town. Negotiations between Bingham, Nestlé and the various key stakeholders in the Health Service had begun four years earlier and had stalled at one point but the successful purchase of the land was completed at the end of 2017.

== Local events organised ==
During his tenure, Bingham organised a number of local events either to raise money for charity or to support activities in the High Peak. These included a funding information day for local charities in early 2011, a sponsored walk with Conservative MEP Emma McClarkin and a charity cricket match in 2013. In 2011 he organised a 'Small Business Day', with the aim of giving local businesses easy access to useful information and in September 2012 Bingham hosted a 'Business Export Seminar' to help local businesses that wanted to start exporting.

== Personal life ==
Bingham follows most sports, particularly cricket and football. He has supported Buxton F.C. since he was a boy, saying that he prefers lower division football over the "glitzy image of the Premiership".

Civic offices
Preceded by Carole Elizabeth Cobb	Councillor for Chapel West Ward on High Peak Borough Council; 1999–2011	Succeeded by Cllr Timothy Norton
Preceded by unknown	Executive Member for Social and Community Development on High Peak Borough Council; 2007–2010	Succeeded by Cllr Jean Wharmby
Parliament of the United Kingdom
Preceded by Tom Levitt	Member of Parliament for High Peak; 2010–2017	Succeeded by Ruth George
