= 2009 Derbyshire County Council election =

2009 UK local government election

| ← 2005 | 4 June 2009 | 2013 → |

All 63 seats to Derbyshire County Council 32 seats needed for a majority
| | First party | Second party | Third party |
|---|---|---|---|
| Party | Conservative | Labour | Liberal Democrats |
| Last election | 15 | 38 | 10 |
| Seats won | 33 | 22 | 8 |
| Seat change | ▲19 | ▼16 | ▼2 |
| Popular vote | 88,403 | 64,787 | 48,413 |
| Percentage | 39.0% | 28.6% | 21.3% |
- 2009 local election results in Derbyshire
Council control before election
Labour
Council control after election
Conservative

Elections to Derbyshire County Council took place on 4 June 2009 as part of the 2009 United Kingdom local elections, having been delayed from 7 May, in order to coincide with elections to the European Parliament.

All locally registered electors (British, Irish, Commonwealth and European Union citizens) who were aged 18 or over on Thursday 2 May 2013 were entitled to vote in the local elections. Those who were temporarily away from their ordinary address (for example, away working, on holiday, in student accommodation or in hospital) were also entitled to vote in the local elections, although those who had moved abroad and registered as overseas electors cannot vote in the local elections. It is possible to register to vote at more than one address (such as a university student who had a term-time address and lives at home during holidays) at the discretion of the local Electoral Register Office, but it remains an offence to vote more than once in the same local government election.

== Summary ==
The election was won by the Conservatives who were elected with a small overall majority. It ended 28 consecutive years of local governance by the Labour Party

== Results ==
Derbyshire County Council election, 2009
| Party | Seats | Gains | Losses | Net gain/loss | Seats % | Votes % | Votes | +/− |
|---|---|---|---|---|---|---|---|---|
| Conservative | 33 | | | ▲19 | 53.2% | 40.68% | 88,403 | |
| Labour | 22 | | | ▼16 | 35.48% | 29.81% | 64,787 | |
| Liberal Democrats | 8 | | | ▼2 | 12.9% | 22.28% | 48,413 | |
| BNP | 0 | | | | 0 | 5.04% | 10,967 | |
| Green | 0 | | | | 0 | 1.24% | 2,714 | |
| UKIP | 0 | | | | 0 | 0.8% | 1,883 | |
| National Front | 0 | | | | 0 | 0.00% | 126 | |
| Independent | 1 | | | | 1.56% | | | |
