= 2013 Derbyshire County Council election =

2013 UK local government election

← 2009	2 May 2013	2017 →

All 64 seats to Derbyshire County Council 33 seats needed for a majority
	First party	Second party	Third party
Party	Labour	Conservative	Liberal Democrats
Last election	33	21	8
Seats won	43	18	3
Seat change	▲18	▼13	▼4
Popular vote	80,665	56,455	15,006
Percentage	41.1%	28.7%	7.6%
- Map showing the results of the 2013 Derbyshire County Council elections.
Council control before election
No overall control
Council control after election
Labour

An election to Derbyshire County Council took place on 2 May 2013 as part of the 2013 United Kingdom local elections. Following the final draft of the 2012 electoral review, 64 councillors were elected from 61 electoral divisions which returned either one or two county councillors each by first-past-the-post voting for a four-year term of office. No elections were held in the City of Derby, which is a unitary authority outside the area covered by the County Council. The Labour Party won back control of the council by a landslide victory, taking forty-two of the authority's sixty-four seats.

All locally registered electors (British, Irish, Commonwealth and European Union citizens) who were aged 18 or over on Thursday 2 May 2013 were entitled to vote in the local elections. Those who were temporarily away from their ordinary address (for example, away working, on holiday, in student accommodation or in hospital) were also entitled to vote in the local elections, although those who had moved abroad and registered as overseas electors cannot vote in the local elections. It is possible to register to vote at more than one address (such as a university student who had a term-time address and lives at home during holidays) at the discretion of the local Electoral Register Office, but it remains an offence to vote more than once in the same local government election.

== Background ==
The previous election ended 28 years of Labour control, giving the Conservatives an overall majority of two seats and control of the council. However, their majority was eroded by the suspension and defection of two Conservative councillors, leaving the council hung.

== Election results ==
Derbyshire County Council Election Overall Result 2013
Party	Seats	Gains	Losses	Net gain/loss	Seats %	Votes %	Votes	+/−
Labour	43			+18	67.2	42.84	87,020	+22,233
Conservative	18			-13	28.1	28.81	58,507	-29,895
Liberal Democrats	3			-4	4.7	7.57	15,379	-33,036
UKIP	0				0	18.71	37,997	+36,114
Other parties	0				0	2.07	4,209	

== Derbyshire County Council – Results by District ==
=== Amber Valley Borough ===
(10 seats, 9 electoral divisions)

Amber Valley Borough Summary Result 2013
Party	Seats	Gains	Losses	Net gain/loss	Seats %	Votes %	Votes	+/−
Labour	7				70	43.2	16,033	
Conservative	3				30	31.6	11,755	
UKIP	0				0	17.7	6,578	
Liberal Democrats	0				0	4.0	1,498	
BNP	0				0	1.9	720	
Other parties	0				0	1.1	415	
Green	0				0	0.4	145	

==== Alfreton and Somercotes ====
Alfreton & Somercotes (2 seats)
Party	Candidate	Votes	%
Labour	Paul James Smith	3,263	27.4
Labour	Steve Marshall-Clarke	2,860	24.0
UKIP	Garry Smith	1,369	11.5
Conservative	Ron Ashton	1,324	11.1
Conservative	Lynne Watson	1,270	10.7
UKIP	Juliette Nicola Stevens	1,010	8.5
Independent	George Soudah	415	3.5
Liberal Democrats	Joel Ross Hunt	269	2.3
Liberal Democrats	Peter Jelf	125	1.1
Turnout		11,905	31.6

==== Alport and Derwent ====
Alport & Derwent (1 seat)
Party	Candidate	Votes	%
Conservative	Martin Tomlinson	1,558	42.3
UKIP	Ashley John Harrison	936	25.4
Labour	Mark Grayling	894	24.3
Liberal Democrats	Ollie Smith	295	8.0
Turnout		3,683	38

==== Belper ====
Belper (1 seat)
Party	Candidate	Votes	%
Labour	John Robert Owen	1,169	39.3
Conservative	Peter Makin	981	33.0
UKIP	Roy Wilford Snape	642	21.6
Liberal Democrats	Jane Vivlenne Benson	182	6.1
Turnout		2,974	33

==== Duffield and Belper South ====
Duffield & Belper South (1 seat)
Party	Candidate	Votes	%
Conservative	Stuart John Bradford	1,340	43.8
Labour	Ben Rupert Edward Bellamy	831	27.2
UKIP	Barry Simpson Clark	656	21.4
Liberal Democrats	Jeremy Richard Benson	233	7.6
Turnout		3,060	33

==== Greater Heanor ====
Greater Heanor (1 seat)
Party	Candidate	Votes	%
Labour	Paul Jones	1,383	51.4
Conservative	Kevin Lee Parkinson	877	32.6
BNP	Cliff Roper	336	12.5
Liberal Democrats	Keith Charles Falconbridge	97	3.6
Turnout		2,693	28

==== Heanor Central ====
Heanor Central (1 seat)
Party	Candidate	Votes	%
Labour	Celia Mary Cox	1,454	46.8
Conservative	Alex Stevenson	780	25.1
UKIP	Kenneth John Clifford	701	22.6
BNP	Adrian Barry Hickman	171	5.5
Turnout		3,106	33

==== Horsley ====
Horsley (1 seat)
Party	Candidate	Votes	%
Conservative	Kevin Buttery	1,463	41.8
Labour	John Philip Banks	1,038	29.7
UKIP	Wayne Porter	864	24.7
Liberal Democrats	Kate Smith	135	3.9
Turnout		3,500	35

==== Ripley East and Codnor ====
Ripley East & Codnor (1 seat)
Party	Candidate	Votes	%
Labour	Steve Freeborn	1,523	44.0
Conservative	Stuart Joynes	967	28.0
UKIP	Ann Fox	799	23.1
BNP	Alan Edwards	89	2.6
Liberal Democrats	Margaret Tomkins	79	2.3
Turnout		3,457	34

==== Ripley West and Heage ====
Ripley West & Heage (1 seat)
Party	Candidate	Votes	%
Labour	David Alan Williams	1,618	39.7
Conservative	David Wilson	1,195	29.3
UKIP	Philip Sanders Rose	970	23.8
Green	Tony Youens	145	3.6
Liberal Democrats	Paul Robin Gibbons	83	2.0
BNP	Ken Cooper	64	1.6
Turnout		4,074	39

=== Bolsover District ===
(6 seats, 6 electoral divisions)

Bolsover District Summary Result 2013
Party	Seats	Gains	Losses	Net gain/loss	Seats %	Votes %	Votes	+/−
Labour	6				100	59.3	8,929	
UKIP	0				0	25.3	3,810	
Conservative	0				0	12.2	1,832	
TUSC	0				0	3.3	495	

==== Barlborough and Clowne ====
Barlborough & Clowne (1 seat)
Party	Candidate	Votes	%
Labour	Anne Western	1,519	61.7
UKIP	Scott Richard Goring	526	21.4
Conservative	David Thomas Jackson	419	17.0
Turnout		2,464	28

==== Bolsover North ====
Bolsover North (1 seat)
Party	Candidate	Votes	%
Labour	Duncan McGregor	1,503	57.1
UKIP	Carl Jones	647	24.6
TUSC	Pete Neeve	247	9.4
Conservative	Aidan Joseph Press	236	9.0
Turnout		2,633	26

==== Bolsover South ====
Bolsover South (1 seat)
Party	Candidate	Votes	%
Labour	Joan Elizabeth Dixon	1,690	60.3
UKIP	Derek Adams	763	27.2
Conservative	Katharine Burrow	218	7.8
TUSC	Jon Dale	134	4.8
Turnout		2,805	29

==== Shirebrook and Pleasley ====
Shirebrook & Pleasley (1 seat)
Party	Candidate	Votes	%
Labour	Marian Stockdale	1,314	61.1
UKIP	Tony Kay	583	27.1
Conservative	Richard Terrance Pender	167	7.8
TUSC	Dean Lloyd Eggleston	87	3.1
Turnout		2,151	25

==== South Normanton and Pinxton ====
South Normanton & Pinxton (1 seat)
Party	Candidate	Votes	%
Labour	Jim Coyle	1,300	54.0
UKIP	Ray Calladine	651	27.0
Conservative	Robert James Sainsbury	348	14.5
Independent	Cherry Anne Drake-Brockman	83	3.5
TUSC	Brian Christopher Loader	27	1.1
Turnout		2,409	25

==== Tibshelf ====
Tibshelf (1 seat)
Party	Candidate	Votes	%
Labour	Clive Richard Moesby	1,603	59.7
UKIP	Joan Bentley	640	23.8
Conservative	Heather Kay Liggett	444	16.5
Turnout		2,687	27

=== Chesterfield Borough ===
(9 seats, 9 electoral divisions)

Chesterfield Borough Summary Result 2013
Party	Seats	Gains	Losses	Net gain/loss	Seats %	Votes %	Votes	+/−
Labour	8	4	0	+4	89	51	13,432	
Liberal Democrats	1	0	4	-4	11	20.9	5,490	
UKIP	0	0	0	0	0	13.8	3,631	
Conservative	0	0	0	0	0	10.3	2,710	
Other parties	0	0	0	0	0	4	1,057	

==== Birdholme ====
Birdholme (1 seat)
Party	Candidate	Votes	%
Labour	Dave Allen	1,792	70.6
Conservative	James Michael Dietsch	376	14.8
Liberal Democrats	Bridget Anne Dunks	371	14.6
Turnout		2,539	28
Labour hold			

==== Boythorpe and Brampton South ====
Boythorpe & Brampton South (1 seat)
Party	Candidate	Votes	%
Labour	Ron Mihaly	1,300	46.0
Liberal Democrats	Keith Falconer	932	33.0
UKIP	Sharon Buxton	414	14.6
Conservative	Marcus Stanton Linsey	183	6.5
Turnout		,2829	34
Labour gain from Liberal Democrats			

==== Brimington ====
Brimington (1 seat)
Party	Candidate	Votes	%
Labour	Walter Burrows	1,857	68.7
Conservative	Barry Thompson	301	11.1
Liberal Democrats	Sharon Taylor	250	9.3
Independent	Mike Mullins	175	6.5
Independent	Paul Alan Mann	119	4.4
Labour hold			
Turnout		2,702	27

==== Loundsley Green and Newbold ====
Loundsley Green & Newbold (1 seat)
Party	Candidate	Votes	%
Labour	Stuart Brittain	1,429	40.5
Liberal Democrats	Tony Rogers	1,124	31.4
UKIP	Keith Lomas	677	18.9
Independent	Mick Bagshaw	181	5.1
Conservative	Nigel Robert Sterland	167	4.7
Turnout		3,578	41
Labour gain from Liberal Democrats			

==== Spire ====
Spire (1 seat)
Party	Candidate	Votes	%
Labour	Sharon Lesley Blank	1,292	55.6
UKIP	Stuart David Yeowart	420	18.1
Independent	Adrian Mather	272	11.7
Liberal Democrats	Maggie Cannon	190	8.2
Conservative	Simon John Temperton	148	6.4
Turnout		2,322	29
Labour hold			

==== St Mary's ====
St Mary's (1 seat)
Party	Candidate	Votes	%
Labour Co-op	Jean Mary Innes	1,517	51.2
UKIP	Mike Abberley	763	25.8
Liberal Democrats	John Barnett	436	14.7
Conservative	James Paul Dale	247	8.4
Turnout		2,963	30
Labour gain from Liberal Democrats			

==== Staveley ====
Staveley (1 seat)
Party	Candidate	Votes	%
Labour	John Graham Williams	1,976	74.4
Independent	Joe Mann	310	11.7
Conservative	Jannet Ann Dale	233	8.8
Liberal Democrats	Chris Beirne	136	5.1
Turnout		2,655	28
Labour hold			

==== Staveley North and Whittington ====
Staveley North & Whittington (1 seat)
Party	Candidate	Votes	%
Labour	Dean Collins	1,307	40.5
Liberal Democrats	Barry Bingham	972	30.1
UKIP	Richard Bexton	829	25.7
Conservative	Malcolm Benjamin Rowley	119	3.7
Labour gain from Liberal Democrats			
Turnout		3,227	33

==== Walton and West ====
Walton & West (1 seat)
Party	Candidate	Votes	%
Liberal Democrats	Keith Patrick Morgan	1,079	30.8
Labour	Martin Michael Stone	962	27.5
Conservative	John David Lee Boult	936	26.7
UKIP	Kevin Coney	528	15.1
Turnout		3,505	42
Liberal Democrats hold			

=== Derbyshire Dales District ===
(6 seats, 6 electoral divisions)

Derbyshire Dales District Summary Result 2013
Party	Seats	Gains	Losses	Net gain/loss	Seats %	Votes %	Votes	+/−
Conservative	4				67	36.8	7,627	
Labour	2				33	29.8	6,190	
UKIP	0				0	20.1	4,171	
Liberal Democrats	0				0	11.3	2,346	
Green	0				0	2.0	418	

==== Ashbourne ====
Ashbourne (1 seat)
Party	Candidate	Votes	%
Conservative	Andrew Lewer	1,985	59.1
UKIP	Leonie Staimar	665	19.8
Labour	Matthew Gareth Jones	420	12.5
Liberal Democrats	Rebecca Goodall	290	8.6
Turnout		3,360	36

==== Bakewell ====
Bakewell (1 seat)
Party	Candidate	Votes	%
Conservative	Judith Anne Twigg	1,937	50.0
Labour	David Hill	793	20.5
UKIP	Philip Robinson	751	19.4
Liberal Democrats	Eleanor Nancolas	394	10.2
Turnout		3,875	39

==== Derwent Valley ====
Derwent Valley (1 seat)
Party	Candidate	Votes	%
Conservative	Michael Vernon Longden	1,674	42.8
UKIP	Michael Hancocks	944	24.2
Labour	Paul Vaughan	904	23.1
Liberal Democrats	Sandra Fearn	387	9.9
Turnout		3,909	41

==== Dovedale ====
Dovedale (1 seat)
Party	Candidate	Votes	%
Conservative	Simon Andrew Spencer	1,473	42.0
Labour	Colin Swindell	1,198	34.1
UKIP	Sarah Elizabeth King	527	15.0
Green	John Robin Youatt	186	5.3
Liberal Democrats	Trish Birchley	125	3.6
Turnout		3,509	37

==== Matlock ====
Matlock (1 seat)
Party	Candidate	Votes	%
Labour	Andy Botham	1,114	29.6
Conservative	Geoff Stevens	1,092	29.0
Liberal Democrats	Steve Flitter	1,028	27.3
UKIP	Tilly Sanders Ward	529	14.1
Turnout		3,763	42

==== Wirksworth ====
Wirksworth (1 seat)
Party	Candidate	Votes	%
Labour	Irene Ratcliffe	1,761	41.2
Conservative	Richard Bright	1,403	32.8
UKIP	Chris Wardle	755	17.7
Green	Christopher Spencer	232	5.4
Liberal Democrats	David Jones	122	2.9
Turnout		4,273	42

=== Erewash Borough ===
(9 seats, 9 electoral divisions)

Erewash Borough Summary Result 2013
Party	Seats	Gains	Losses	Net gain/loss	Seats %	Votes %	Votes	+/−
Labour	5				56	34.6	9,303	
Conservative	4				44	35.9	9,638	
UKIP	0				0	23.3	6,271	
Liberal Democrats	0				0	4.9	1,327	
Green	0				0	1.1	283	
Monster Raving Loony	0				0	0.2	59	

==== Breadsall and West Hallam ====
Breadsall & West Hallam (1 seat)
Party	Candidate	Votes	%
Conservative	Carol Ann Hart	1,616	49.5
Labour	Linda McGraw	791	24.3
UKIP	Alan Sidney Rose	604	18.5
Green	Jeannie Elizabeth Alderdice	170	5.2
Liberal Democrats	Kristopher James Watts	81	2.5
Turnout		3,262	34.9

==== Breaston ====
Breaston (1 seat)
Party	Candidate	Votes	%
Conservative	Robert Alan Parkinson	1,481	38.6
UKIP	Caroline Susan Gent	1,134	29.6
Labour	Louis Booth	1,050	27.4
Liberal Democrats	Martin Charles Garnett	172	4.5
Turnout		3,837	36.8

==== Ilkeston East ====
Ilkeston East (1 seat)
Party	Candidate	Votes	%
Labour	Glennice Birkin	1,436	52.0
UKIP	Brendan Patrick Berry	709	25.7
Conservative	Kevin Philip Miller	461	16.7
Liberal Democrats	Rachel Allen	97	3.5
Monster Raving Loony	Whopping Lord Foghole	59	2.1
Turnout		2,762	28.2

==== Ilkeston South ====
Ilkeston South (1 seat)
Party	Candidate	Votes	%
Labour	John Arnold Fudd	1,279	49.2
UKIP	Giles Farrand	861	33.1
Conservative	Richard Harris	406	15.6
Liberal Democrats	Fiona Aanonson	56	2.2
Turnout		2,602	28.6

==== Ilkeston West ====
Ilkeston West (1 seat)
Party	Candidate	Votes	%
Labour	Michelle Wendy Booth	1,344	44.5
Conservative	Val Custance	942	31.2
UKIP	Jamie Parker	537	17.8
Green	Philip Hood	113	3.7
Liberal Democrats	Angela Togni	84	2.8
Turnout		3,020	32.4

==== Long Eaton ====
Long Eaton (1 seat)
Party	Candidate	Votes	%
Labour	Roland Leon Hosker	1,384	45.7
Conservative	Kewal Singh Athwal	978	32.3
UKIP	Bexley Sears	503	16.6
Liberal Democrats	Susannah Louise Watts	161	5.3
Turnout		3,026	31.9

==== Petersham ====
Petersham (1 seat)
Party	Candidate	Votes	%
Labour	Clare Elaine Neill	1,237	41.2
Conservative	Garry Keith Hickton	854	28.4
UKIP	Wg Cdr Mike Clulow	620	20.6
Liberal Democrats	Ian Allan Neill	295	9.8
Turnout		3,006	30.8

==== Sandiacre ====
Sandiacre (1 seat)
Party	Candidate	Votes	%
Conservative	Wayne Major	1,548	46.0
Labour	Patrick Martin Pritchett	969	28.8
UKIP	Mark Robert Willis	644	19.1
Liberal Democrats	Martin Lowe	208	6.2
Turnout		3,369	36.2

==== Sawley ====
Sawley (1 seat)
Party	Candidate	Votes	%
Conservative	Daniel Walton	1,352	40.5
Labour	Bob Knight	1,157	34.6
UKIP	Simon Nicholas Gent	659	19.7
Liberal Democrats	Rodney Wilby Allen	173	5.2
Turnout		3,341	35.1

=== High Peak Borough ===
(8 seats, 7 electoral divisions)

High Peak Borough Summary Result 2013
Party	Seats	Gains	Losses	Net gain/loss	Seats %	Votes %	Votes	+/−
Labour	4				62.5	38.9	11,266	
Conservative	2				25	32.8	9,557	
Liberal Democrats	2				12.5	11.9	3,452	
UKIP	0				0	8.9	2,593	
Green	0				0	5.1	1,487	
Other parties	0				0	2.7	771	

==== Buxton North and East ====
Buxton North & East (1 seat)
Party	Candidate	Votes	%
Labour	Caitlin Janette Bisknell	1,138	45.3
Conservative	Pam Reddy	795	31.7
UKIP	Margaret Florence Appleby	495	19.7
Liberal Democrats	Graham Scott	84	3.3
Turnout		2,512	28

==== Buxton West ====
Buxton West (1 seat)
Party	Candidate	Votes	%
Conservative	Tony Arthur Kemp	1,123	35.6
Labour	Fiona Sloman	952	30.2
Independent	Bob Morris	771	24.4
Green	Matthew Alexander Bain	219	6.9
Liberal Democrats	Christopher Richard Warhurst Weaver	90	2.9
Turnout		3,155	33

==== Chapel and Hope Valley ====
Chapel & Hope Valley (1 seat)
Party	Candidate	Votes	%
Conservative	Jocelyn Sarah Street	1,441	42.1
Labour	Tim Norton	897	26.2
UKIP	Ian Guiver	586	17.1
Green	Charlotte Nancy Farrell	349	10.2
Liberal Democrats	Brian Colin Hallsworth	149	4.4
Turnout		3,422	37

==== Etherow ====
Etherow (1 seat)
Party	Candidate	Votes	%
Labour	Dave Wilcox	1,393	65.5
Conservative	Peter James Kay	610	28.7
Liberal Democrats	Alan Debes	123	5.8
Turnout		2,126	26

==== Glossop and Charlesworth ====
Glossop & Charlesworth (2 seats)
Party	Candidate	Votes	%
Labour	Damien Thomas Greenhalgh	2,432	22.0
Labour	Ellie Wilcox	2,403	21.7
Conservative	Jean Wharmby	1,939	17.5
Conservative	George David Wharmby	1,906	17.2
UKIP	David Phillips	1,088	9.8
Green	Peter Duncan Allen	682	6.2
Liberal Democrats	Stephen David Worrall	355	3.2
Liberal Democrats	George Kuppan	248	2.2
Turnout		11,053	33.1

==== New Mills ====
New Mills (1 seat)
Party	Candidate	Votes	%
Liberal Democrats	Beth Atkins	1,408	37.9
Labour	Alan Barrow	1,205	32.4
Conservative	Jeff Lawton	865	23.3
Green	Dee Sayce	237	6.4
Turnout		3,715	37

==== Whaley Bridge ====
Whaley Bridge (1 seat)
Party	Candidate	Votes	%
Liberal Democrats	David William Lomax	995	31.6
Conservative	Rodney Bruce Gilmour	878	27.9
Labour	Martin Lindsay Thomas	846	26.9
UKIP	James Henry Bush	424	13.5
Turnout		3,143	38

=== North East Derbyshire District ===
(8 seats, 7 electoral divisions)

North East Derbyshire District Summary Result 2013
Party	Seats	Gains	Losses	Net gain/loss	Seats %	Votes %	Votes	+/−
Labour	6				75	50.1	13,835	
Conservative	2				25	25.6	7,061	
UKIP	0				0	20.2	5,562	
Liberal Democrats	0				0	2.2	607	
Other parties	0				0	1.9	527	

==== Clay Cross North ====
Clay Cross North (1 seat)
Party	Candidate	Votes	%
Labour	Brian Wright	1,737	73.4
Conservative	Linda Rowley	630	26.6
Turnout		2,367	

==== Clay Cross South ====
Clay Cross South (1 seat)
Party	Candidate	Votes	%
Labour	Kevin Gillott	1,909	67.2
Conservative	William Armitage	541	19.0
Independent	Morgan Howells	391	13.8
Turnout		2,841	

==== Dronfield East ====
Dronfield East (1 seat)
Party	Candidate	Votes	%
Labour	Janet Hill	1,238	38.8
Conservative	Angelique Foster	1,087	34.1
UKIP	Roderick Bernard Arundale Harrison	521	16.3
Liberal Democrats	Simon Philip Temple	206	6.5
Independent	Clive Gill	136	4.3
Turnout		3,188	

==== Dronfield West and Walton ====
Dronfield West & Walton (1 seat)
Party	Candidate	Votes	%
Conservative	Stuart Ellis	1,312	35.7
UKIP	Adrian Lewis Clarke	1,139	31.0
Labour	Michael Gordon	820	22.3
Liberal Democrats	Wendy Mary Temple	401	10.9
Turnout		3,672	

==== Eckington and Killamarsh ====
Eckington & Killamarsh (2 seats)
Party	Candidate	Votes	%
Labour	Diane Charles	2,507	28.1
Labour	Brian Ridgway	2,436	27.3
UKIP	Charles David Rae Watson	1,262	14.5
UKIP	David Stanley Rae Watson	1,065	11.9
Conservative	Lewis James Blackburn	843	9.5
Conservative	Roger Anthony Hall	813	9.1
Turnout		8,926	

==== Sutton ====
Sutton (1 seat)
Party	Candidate	Votes	%
Labour	Julie Ann Hill	1,726	60.8
UKIP	Glen John Potter	801	28.2
Conservative	Charlotte Cupit	312	11.0
Turnout		2,839	

==== Wingerworth and Shirland ====
Wingerworth & Shirland (1 seat)
Party	Candidate	Votes	%
Conservative	Barry Lewis	1,523	40.5
Labour	Barry Herbert Barnes	1,462	38.9
UKIP	Alan Randall	774	20.6
Turnout		3759	

=== South Derbyshire District ===
(8 seats, 8 electoral divisions)

South Derbyshire District Summary Result 2013
Party	Seats	Gains	Losses	Net gain/loss	Seats %	Votes %	Votes	+/−
Labour	5				62.5	34.9	8,032	
Conservative	3				37.5	36.2	8,327	
UKIP	0				0	23.4	5,381	
Liberal Democrats	0				0	2.9	659	
Other parties	0				0	2.4	557	
Socialist Labour	0				0	0.2	45	

==== Aston ====
Aston (1 seat)
Party	Candidate	Votes	%
Labour	Robert Davison	1,279	37.1
UKIP	Alan Wayne Graves	1,120	32.5
Conservative	Chris Pratt	968	28.1
Liberal Democrats	Kevin John Maher	83	2.4
Turnout		3,450	40

==== Etwall and Repton ====
Etwall & Repton (1 seat)
Party	Candidate	Votes	%
Conservative	Martyn Ford	1,775	52.7
UKIP	Martin Ashley Bardoe	816	24.2
Labour	Brian John Cox	685	20.4
Liberal Democrats	Christopher Simon Collard	92	2.7
Turnout		3,366	35

==== Hilton ====
Hilton (1 seat)
Party	Candidate	Votes	%
Conservative	Julie Elizabeth Patten	1,353	51.4
Labour	Steve Cooper	608	23.1
UKIP	Eric Peter Wayne Graves	473	18.0
Independent	Timothy Noel Robinson	135	5.1
Liberal Democrats	Alexis Saliou Diouf	63	2.4
Turnout		2,632	28

==== Linton ====
Linton (1 seat)
Party	Candidate	Votes	%
Labour	Kath Lauro	985	32.4
Conservative	Charles Jones	845	27.8
UKIP	David Anthony Gunn	738	24.3
Independent	Mike Lacey	311	10.2
Liberal Democrats	Lorraine Karen Johnson	162	5.3
Turnout		3,041	35

==== Melbourne ====
Melbourne (1 seat)
Party	Candidate	Votes	%
Conservative	Linda Mary Chilton	1,519	45.8
Labour	Alan Mercer Jones	1,036	31.2
UKIP	Alan Jack Graves	638	19.2
Liberal Democrats	Rebecca Jane Wilkinson	126	3.8
Turnout		3,319	36

==== Swadlincote Central ====
Swadlincote Central (1 seat)
Party	Candidate	Votes	%
Labour	Paul Dunn	1,006	41.6
Conservative	Gill Farrington	712	29.5
UKIP	Barry Appleby	540	22.3
Independent	David James Bird	69	2.9
Liberal Democrats	Georgina Mary Bennion	49	2.0
Independent	Jon McEwan	42	1.7
Turnout		2,418	26

==== Swadlincote North ====
Swadlincote North (1 seat)
Party	Candidate	Votes	%
Labour	Sean Andrew Bambrick	1,366	56.8
Conservative	Kim Coe	486	20.2
UKIP	Ann Graves	474	19.7
Socialist Labour	Paul Liversuch	45	1.9
Liberal Democrats	Shirley Anne Niblock	36	1.5
Turnout		2,407	26

==== Swadlincote South ====
Swadlincote South (1 seat)
Party	Candidate	Votes	%
Labour	Trevor Southerd	1,067	45.1
Conservative	Pat Murray	669	28.3
UKIP	Mike Dawson	582	24.6
Liberal Democrats	Liam Clarke	48	2.0
Turnout		2,366	27

== By-Elections between May 2013 – May 2017 ==
By-elections are called when a representative Councillor resigns or dies, so are unpredictable. A by-election is held to fill a political office that has become vacant between the scheduled elections.

=== Alport and Derwent – 14 November 2014 ===
Alport and Derwent By-Election 14 November 2014
Party	Candidate	Votes	%	±%
Conservative	David Taylor	1,118	44.9	+3.1
UKIP	David Fisher	715	28.7	+3.6
Labour	Mike Ratcliffe	656	26.4	+1.2
Majority		403	16.2	
Turnout		2489	25.8	
Conservative hold		Swing		

=== Brimington – 5 February 2015 ===
Brimington By-Election 5 February 2015
Party	Candidate	Votes	%	±%
Labour	Tricia Gilby	1,293	62.0	−6.7
UKIP	Paul Christopher Stone	380	18.2	+18.2
Independent	Mick Bagshaw	157	7.5	+7.5
Liberal Democrats	John Edward Ahern	135	6.5	−2.8
Conservative	Lewis Mark Preston	120	5.8	−5.4
Majority		913	43.8	
Turnout		2085	21.9	
Labour hold		Swing		

=== Ashbourne – 7 May 2015 ===
Ashbourne By-Election 7 May 2015
Party	Candidate	Votes	%	±%
Conservative	Stephen Bull	4,715	68.6	+9.5
Labour	Simon John Meredith	965	14.0	+1.5
Green	Andrew White	647	9.4	+9.4
Liberal Democrats	David Rowe	543	7.9	−0.7
Majority		3,750	54.6	
Turnout		6,870	73.3	
Conservative hold		Swing		

=== Derwent Valley – 24 September 2015 ===
Derwent Valley By-Election 24 September 2015
Party	Candidate	Votes	%	±%
Conservative	Jo Wild	1,017	51.0	+8.1
Labour	Martin Rutter	466	21.5	−1.7
Liberal Democrats	Michael Crapper	314	13.6	+4.6
UKIP	Mike Dawson	285	13.1	−11.0
Majority		641	29.5	
Turnout		2,172	22.9	
Conservative hold		Swing		
