= Ruth George =

British politician (born 1969)

Cllr Ruth George
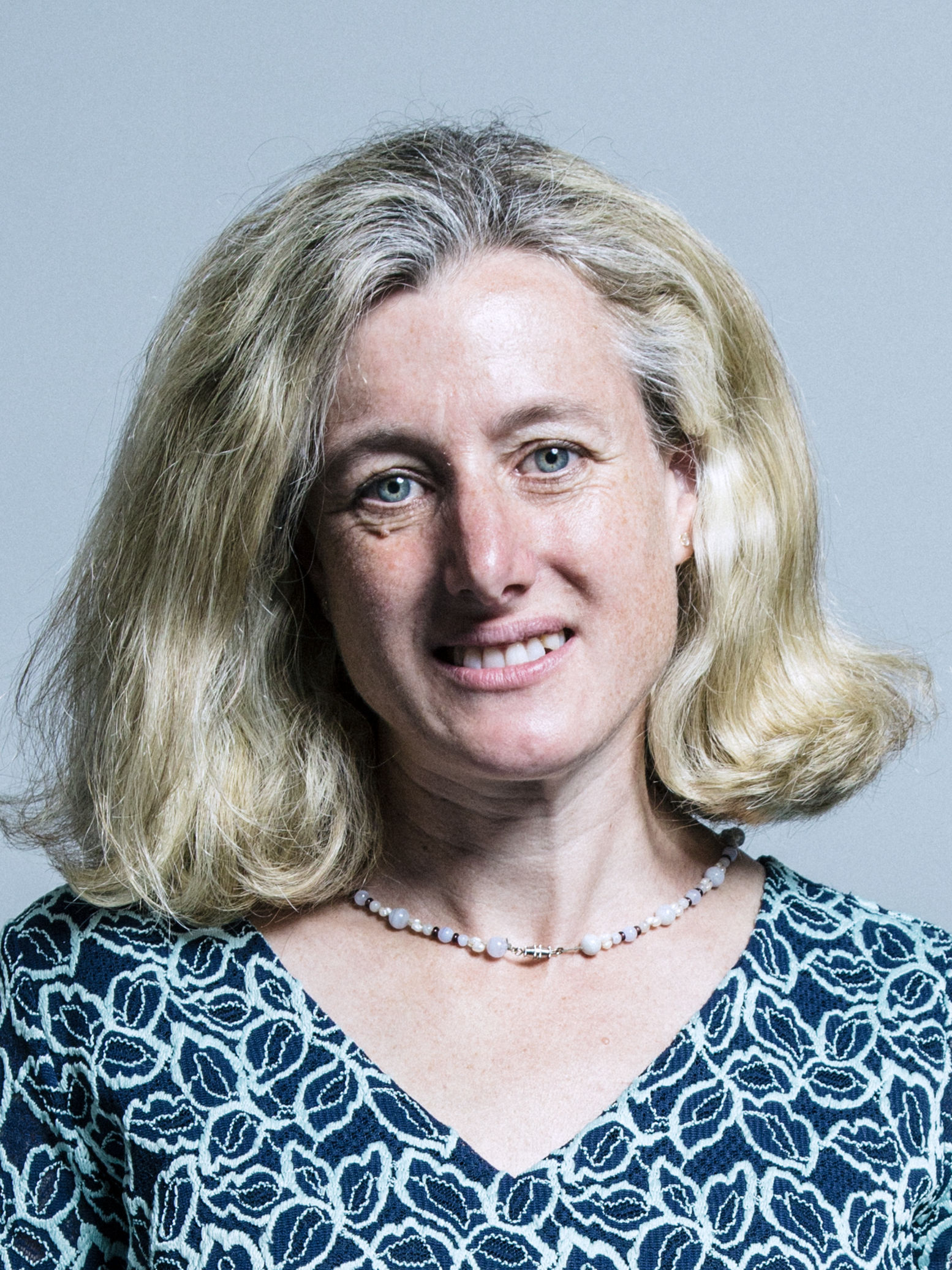
- Official portrait, 2017

Deputy Leader of the Labour Group on Derbyshire County Council
- In office 19 May 2021 – 18 February 2025
- Leader: Joan Dixon
- Preceded by: Mick Wall

Member of Parliament for High Peak
- In office 8 June 2017 – 6 November 2019
- Preceded by: Andrew Bingham
- Succeeded by: Robert Largan

Member of Derbyshire County Council for Whaley Bridge
- Incumbent
- Assumed office 13 February 2020
- Preceded by: Alison Fox

Personal details
- Born: Ruth Stephanie Nicole George; 27 November 1969 (age 56) Epping, Essex, England
- Party: Independent
- Other political affiliations: Labour (–2025)
- Education: Millfield
- Alma mater: University of Manchester

Ruth Stephanie Nicole George (born 27 November 1969) is a British politician who served as Member of Parliament (MP) for High Peak from 2017 to 2019. A former member of the Labour Party, she has been a Member of Derbyshire County Council since 2020.

== Early life and professional career ==
Born in Epping, Essex, George grew up in Somerset and attended the independent Millfield boarding school. She later studied Politics and Modern History at the University of Manchester.

George trained as a tax accountant and, while in her twenties, helped to found an accountancy business in Chapel-en-le-Frith. Before becoming an MP, George worked at the Central Office of the Union of Shop, Distributive and Allied Workers (USDAW) in Manchester.

== Political career ==
=== Parliamentary career ===
George was selected as the Labour candidate for the High Peak constituency on 1 May 2017, and contested Whaley Bridge ward at the 2017 Derbyshire County Council elections three days later. Although she was unsuccessful in the local council election, George gained the parliamentary seat from incumbent Conservative Andrew Bingham at the 2017 general election with a 7% swing and a 2,322 majority.

In the vote of January 2019, George voted against the Brexit withdrawal agreement.

On 19 February 2019, after a Labour councillor suggested The Independent Group's financial backers were "Israelis" on Facebook, George responded that 'Support from the State of Israel, which supports both Conservative and Labour 'Friends of Israel' of which Luciana was chair is possible and I would not condemn those who suggest it, especially when the group's financial backers are not being revealed'. After criticism from Jewish groups, which had accused her of invoking an antisemitic conspiracy theory, she apologised and withdrew her comment.

On Wednesday 27 March 2019, her Ten Minute Rule Bill calling for sky lanterns to be banned, after there had been some major fires, was passed.

After just over two years in post, she was defeated by Conservative Robert Largan at the 2019 general election.

=== Local government ===
George was elected to represent Whaley Bridge on Derbyshire County Council in a February 2020 by-election. She was re-elected at the 2021 Derbyshire County Council elections in May 2021, despite a challenge from former MP Edwina Currie. Following the elections, George was elected Deputy Leader of the Labour Group on the council after her predecessor lost his seat.

In February 2025, she was deselected by her local party ahead of the 2025 Derbyshire County Council election; she subsequently announced she would contest the election as an independent. On 1 May 2025 she was re-elected to Derbyshire County Council as an independent in Whaley Bridge ward, gaining 57% of the votes cast.

Parliament of the United Kingdom
Preceded by Andrew Bingham	Member of Parliament for High Peak; 2017–2019	Succeeded by Robert Largan
