= 2017 Derbyshire County Council election =

2017 UK local government election

← 2013	4 May 2017	2021 →

All 64 seats to Derbyshire County Council 33 seats needed for a majority
	First party	Second party	Third party
Party	Conservative	Labour	Liberal Democrats
Last election	18	43	3
Seats won	37	24	3
Seat change	▲19	▼19	Steady
Popular vote	93,546	76,135	25,259
Percentage	43.9%	35.8%	11.9%
- Map showing the results of the 2017 Derbyshire County Council elections.
Council control before election
Labour
Council control after election
Conservative

An election to Derbyshire County Council took place on 4 May 2017 as part of the 2017 United Kingdom local elections. 64 councillors were elected from 61 electoral divisions which returned either one or two county councillors each by first-past-the-post voting for a four-year term of office. No elections were held in the City of Derby, which is a unitary authority outside the area covered by the County Council. The Conservative Party won back control of the council, taking thirty-seven of the authority's sixty-four seats.

All locally registered electors (British, Irish, Commonwealth and European Union citizens) who were aged 18 or over on Thursday 4 May 2017 were entitled to vote in the local elections. Those who were temporarily away from their ordinary address (for example, away working, on holiday, in student accommodation or in hospital) were also entitled to vote in the local elections, although those who had moved abroad and registered as overseas electors cannot vote in the local elections. It is possible to register to vote at more than one address (such as a university student who had a term-time address and lives at home during holidays) at the discretion of the local Electoral Register Office, but it remains an offence to vote more than once in the same local government election.

== Election results ==
Derbyshire County Council Election Overall Result 2017
Party	Seats	Gains	Losses	Net gain/loss	Seats %	Votes %	Votes	+/−
Conservative	37	19	0	▲19	57.8	43.9	100,574	+42,097
Labour	24	0	19	▼19	37.5	36.5	83,422	-3,597
Liberal Democrats	3	2	2	Steady	4.7	11.5	26,262	+10,883
UKIP	0	0	0	Steady	0	4.2	9,640	-28,357
Green	0	0	0	Steady	0	2.1	4,779	
Other parties	0	0	0	Steady	0	1.8	4,222	

== Derbyshire County Council – Results by District ==
=== Amber Valley Borough ===
(10 seats, 9 electoral divisions)

Amber Valley Borough Summary Result 2017
Party	Seats	Gains	Losses	Net gain/loss	Seats %	Votes %	Votes	+/−
Conservative	8	5	0	▲5	80	48.7	20,170	
Labour	2	0	5	▼5	20	37.1	15,382	
UKIP	0	0	0	Steady	0	4.6	1,896	
Liberal Democrats	0	0	0	Steady	0	4.4	1,840	
Green	0	0	0	Steady	0	4.3	1,762	
Independent	0	0	0	Steady	0	0.9	358	

==== Alfreton and Somercotes ====
Alfreton & Somercotes (2 seats)
Party	Candidate	Votes	%
Labour	Paul Smith	2,677	23.2
Labour	Steve Marshall-Clarke	2,591	22.4
Conservative	Kathy Moss	2,408	20.8
Conservative	Gareth Gee	2,311	20.0
UKIP	Stuart Flintoff Bent	722	6.2
Green	Steve Elliott	375	3.2
Liberal Democrats	Vikki Bonsall	284	2.5
Liberal Democrats	Kate Smith	195	1.7
Turnout		11,563	
Labour hold			
Labour hold			

==== Alport and Derwent ====
Alport & Derwent (1 seat)
Party	Candidate	Votes	%
Conservative	David Taylor	2,550	57.9
Labour	Jyoti Michael Wilkinson	1,249	28.4
Liberal Democrats	Paul Smith	329	7.5
Green	William MacFarlane	280	6.4
Turnout		4,408	
Conservative hold			

==== Belper ====
Belper (1 seat)
Party	Candidate	Votes	%
Conservative	Peter Makin	1,714	46.3
Labour	John Robert Owen	1,590	42.9
Green	Dave Wells	226	6.1
Liberal Democrats	Richard Alan Salmon	175	4.7
Turnout		3,705	
Conservative gain from Labour			

==== Duffield and Belper South ====
Duffield & Belper South (1 seat)
Party	Candidate	Votes	%
Conservative	Chris Short	1,770	47.8
Labour	Carol Angharad	889	24.0
Green	Sue MacFarlane	439	11.8
Independent	Stuart John Bradford	358	9.7
Liberal Democrats	Jeremy Richard Benson	250	6.7
Turnout		3,706	
Conservative hold			

==== Greater Heanor ====
Greater Heanor (1 seat)
Party	Candidate	Votes	%
Conservative	Alexander George Stevenson	1,431	47.9
Labour	Paul Jones	1,158	38.8
UKIP	Daniel Joseph Bamford	261	8.7
Liberal Democrats	Joel Hunt	71	2.4
Green	Christina Ann Smith	67	2.2
Turnout		2,988	
Conservative gain from Labour			

==== Heanor Central ====
Heanor Central (1 seat)
Party	Candidate	Votes	%
Conservative	Richard Henry Iliffe	1,388	43.6
Labour	Celia Mary Cox	1,305	41.0
UKIP	Geoff Aldwinckle	315	9.9
Liberal Democrats	George White	122	3.8
Green	James Major John Brooks	55	1.7
Turnout		3,185	
Conservative gain from Labour			

==== Horsley ====
Horsley (1 seat)
Party	Candidate	Votes	%
Conservative	Kevin Buttery	2,613	64.1
Labour	John Christopher Porter	930	22.8
UKIP	Adrian William Nathan	212	5.2
Liberal Democrats	Thomas Hague	197	4.8
Green	Lian Pizzey	124	3.0
Turnout		4,076	
Conservative hold			

==== Ripley East and Codnor ====
Ripley East & Codnor (1 seat)
Party	Candidate	Votes	%
Conservative	Ron Ashton	1,789	52.2
Labour	Steve Freeborn	1,315	38.4
UKIP	Gaz Smith	179	5.2
Green	Alex Bear	77	2.2
Liberal Democrats	Peter Jelf	66	1.9
Turnout		3,426	
Conservative gain from Labour			

==== Ripley West and Heage ====
Ripley West & Heage (1 seat)
Party	Candidate	Votes	%
Conservative	Trevor Mark Ainsworth	2,196	50.5
Labour	David Alan Williams	1,678	38.6
UKIP	Philip Sanders Rose	207	4.8
Liberal Democrats	Richard Smeeton	151	3.5
Green	Marian Alexandra Taylor	119	2.7
Turnout		4,351	
Conservative gain from Labour			

=== Bolsover District ===
(6 seats, 6 electoral divisions)

Bolsover District Summary Result 2017
Party	Seats	Gains	Losses	Net gain/loss	Seats %	Votes %	Votes	+/−
Labour	6	0	0	Steady	100	52.4	8,106	
Conservative	0	0	0	Steady	0	29.9	4,620	
Liberal Democrats	0	0	0	Steady	0	6.2	963	
UKIP	0	0	0	Steady	0	5.8	892	
TUSC	0	0	0	Steady	0	2.4	365	
Other parties	0	0	0	Steady	0	3.3	515	

==== Barlborough and Clowne ====
Barlborough & Clowne (1 seat)
Party	Candidate	Votes	%
Labour	Anne Western	1,492	58.0
Conservative	David Carl Dixon	951	37.0
Liberal Democrats	Ben Marshall	130	5.1
Turnout		2,573	
Labour hold			

==== Bolsover North ====
Bolsover North (1 seat)
Party	Candidate	Votes	%
Labour	Duncan McGregor	1,416	57.7
Conservative	Neil David Yewman	717	29.2
TUSC	Elaine Evans	163	6.6
Liberal Democrats	Jayne Phoenix	160	6.5
Turnout		2,456	
Labour hold			

==== Bolsover South ====
Bolsover South (1 seat)
Party	Candidate	Votes	%
Labour Co-op	Joan Elizabeth Dixon	1,335	52.6
Conservative	Sophie Dack	848	33.4
TUSC	Jon Dale	202	8.0
Liberal Democrats	Steven Raison	153	6.0
Turnout		2,538	
Labour Co-op hold			

==== Shirebrook and Pleasley ====
Shirebrook & Pleasley (1 seat)
Party	Candidate	Votes	%
Labour	Christine Dale	1,222	48.4
Independent	David Anthony Taylor	515	20.4
Conservative	Katharine Ann Burrow	430	17.0
UKIP	Mark Steven Nolan	213	8.4
Liberal Democrats	Ross Shipman	147	5.8
Turnout		2,527	
Labour hold			

==== South Normanton and Pinxton ====
South Normanton & Pinxton (1 seat)
Party	Candidate	Votes	%
Labour	Jim Coyle	1,135	45.9
Conservative	David Tillyer	802	32.4
UKIP	Jacqui Calladine	342	13.8
Liberal Democrats	Martin Cheung	196	7.9
Turnout		2,475	
Labour hold			

==== Tibshelf ====
Tibshelf (1 seat)
Party	Candidate	Votes	%
Labour	Clive Richard Moesby	1,506	52.1
Conservative	Samuel Jacob Boam	872	30.2
UKIP	Ray Calladine	337	11.7
Liberal Democrats	David Alister Roulston	177	6.1
Turnout		2,892	
Labour hold			

=== Chesterfield Borough ===
(9 seats, 9 electoral divisions)

Chesterfield Borough Summary Result 2017
Party	Seats	Gains	Losses	Net gain/loss	Seats %	Votes %	Votes	+/−
Labour	7	0	1	▼1	77.77	46.9	12,582	
Liberal Democrats	1	1	1	Steady	11.11	23.8	6,392	
Conservative	1	1	0	▲1	11.11	23.5	6,306	
UKIP	0	0	0	Steady	0	1.0	277	
Green	0	0	0	Steady	0	0.32	86	
Other parties	0	0	0	Steady	0	4.4	1187	

==== Birdholme ====
Birdholme (1 seat)
Party	Candidate	Votes	%	
Labour	Dave Allen	1,646	59.2	▼11.4
Conservative	Paul Gibbons	757	27.2	▲12.4
Liberal Democrats	Amanda Jane Brassington	377	13.6	▼1.0
Turnout				
Labour hold		Swing	▼11.9%	

==== Boythorpe and Brampton South ====
Boythorpe & Brampton South (1 seat)
Party	Candidate	Votes	%	±%
Labour	Ron Mihaly	1,384	45.6	▼0.4
Liberal Democrats	Keith Falconer	1152	37.9	▲4.9
Conservative	Sara Kay Scotting	502	16.5	▲10.0
Turnout				
Labour hold		Swing	▼2.65%	

==== Brimington ====
Brimington (1 seat)
Party	Candidate	Votes	%	±%
Labour	Stuart Brittain	1,671	58.6	▼10.1
Conservative	Adam Fowler	679	23.8	▲12.7
Liberal Democrats	Tony Rogers	266	9.3	Steady
Brimington Independents	Paul Christopher Stone	238	8.3	▼2.6
Turnout				
Labour hold		Swing	▼11.4%	

==== Loundsley Green and Newbold ====
Loundsley Green & Newbold (1 seat)
Party	Candidate	Votes	%	±%
Labour	Mick Wall	1,650	47.3	▲6.8
Liberal Democrats	Tom Snowdon	990	28.4	▼3.0
Conservative	John Robert Briers Scotting	673	19.3	▲14.6
Chesterfield Independents	Sharon Buxton	179	5.1	▼18.9
Turnout				
Labour hold		Swing	▲4.9%	

==== Spire ====
Spire (1 seat)
Party	Candidate	Votes	%	±%
Labour	Sharon Lesley Blank	1,263	55.1	▼0.5
Conservative	Nigel Robert Sterland	505	22.0	▲15.6
Liberal Democrats	Maggie Cannon	287	12.5	▲4.3
Independent	Adrian Mather	239	10.4	▼1.3
Turnout				
Labour hold		Swing	▼8.05%	

==== St Mary's ====
St Mary's (1 seat)
Party	Candidate	Votes	%	±%
Labour Co-op	Jean Mary Innes	1,433	50.3	▼0.9
Conservative	Malcolm Benjamin Rowley	646	22.7	▲14.3
Liberal Democrats	Matthew James Genn	405	14.2	▼0.5
UKIP	Kerrie Louise Webb	277	9.7	▼16.1
Green	John Clifford Levis	86	3.0	▲3.0
Turnout				
Labour Co-op hold		Swing	▼7.6%	

==== Staveley ====
Staveley (1 seat)
Party	Candidate	Votes	%	±%
Labour	Helen Ann Elliott	1,331	52.3	▼22.1
Independent	Mick Bagshaw	531	20.9	▲9.2
Conservative	James Liam Hunt	494	19.4	▲10.6
Liberal Democrats	Stephen James Hartley	187	7.4	▲2.3
Turnout				{{{change}}}
Labour hold		Swing	▼15.65%	

==== Staveley North and Whittington ====
Staveley North & Whittington (1 seat)
Party	Candidate	Votes	%	±%
Liberal Democrats	Barry Bingham	1,325	43.1	▲13.0
Labour	Dean Collins	1,241	40.4	▼0.1
Conservative	Oliver Scheidt	509	16.6	▲12.9
Turnout				
Liberal Democrats gain from Labour		Swing	▲6.5%	

==== Walton and West ====
Walton & West (1 seat)
Party	Candidate	Votes	%	±%
Conservative	John David Lee Boult	1,541	39.4	▲12.7
Liberal Democrats	Paul Adam Niblock	1403	35.9	▲5.1
Labour	Gordon Alexander McLaren	963	24.6	▼2.9
Turnout				
Conservative gain from Liberal Democrats		Swing	▲3.8%	

=== Derbyshire Dales District ===
(6 seats, 6 electoral divisions)

Derbyshire Dales District Summary Result 2017
Party	Seats	Gains	Losses	Net gain/loss	Seats %	Votes %	Votes	+/−
Conservative	4	0	0	Steady	66.66	51.6	12,938	
Labour	1	0	1	▼1	16.66	22.6	5,671	
Liberal Democrats	1	1	0	▲1	16.66	17.4	4,359	
UKIP	0	0	0	Steady	0	2.0	502	
Green	0	0	0	Steady	0	1.4	358	
Other parties	0	0	0	Steady	0	5.0	1,250	

==== Ashbourne ====
Ashbourne (1 seat)
Party	Candidate	Votes	%
Conservative	Steve Bull	2,775	73.4
Liberal Democrats	Rebecca Goodall	751	19.9
UKIP	Richard Stone	254	6.7
Turnout		3,780	
Conservative hold			

==== Bakewell ====
Bakewell (1 seat)
Party	Candidate	Votes	%
Conservative	Judith Twigg	2,652	60.7
Labour	Helen Swift	1,103	25.3
Liberal Democrats	Eleanor Nancolas	613	14.0
Turnout		4,368	
Conservative hold			

==== Derwent Valley ====
Derwent Valley (1 seat)
Party	Candidate	Votes	%
Conservative	Jason Atkin	2,291	56.7
Labour	Martin Rutter	897	22.2
Liberal Democrats	Michael Crapper	606	15.0
UKIP	Paul Roe	248	6.1
Turnout		4,042	
Conservative hold			

==== Dovedale ====
Dovedale (1 seat)
Party	Candidate	Votes	%
Conservative	Simon Spencer	1,825	47.0
Independent	Colin Swindell	1,250	32.2
Labour	Tom Barker	433	11.2
Liberal Democrats	Martin Aiton	241	6.2
Green	John Robin Youatt	132	3.4
Turnout		3,881	
Conservative hold			

==== Matlock ====
Matlock (1 seat)
Party	Candidate	Votes	%
Liberal Democrats	Sue Burfoot	1,889	42.3
Conservative	Ann Elliott	1,383	30.9
Labour	Andy Botham	1,198	26.8
Turnout		4,470	
Liberal Democrats gain from Labour			

==== Wirksworth ====
Wirksworth (1 seat)
Party	Candidate	Votes	%
Labour	Irene Ratcliffe	2,040	45.0
Conservative	Richard Bright	2,012	44.3
Liberal Democrats	Gill Bates	259	5.7
Green	Ivan Dixon	226	5.0
Turnout		4,537	
Labour hold			

=== Erewash Borough ===
(9 seats, 9 electoral divisions)

Erewash Borough Summary Result 2017
Party	Seats	Gains	Losses	Net gain/loss	Seats %	Votes %	Votes	+/−
Conservative	8	4	0	+4	88.89	51.6	15,597	
Labour	1	0	4	-4	11.11	30.0	9,097	
Liberal Democrats	0	0	0	0	0	7.6	2,295	
UKIP	0	0	0	0	0	6.5	1,956	
Green	0	0	0	0	0	2.5	756	
Other parties	0	0	0	0	0	1.8	547	

==== Breadsall and West Hallam ====
Breadsall & West Hallam (1 seat)
Party	Candidate	Votes	%
Conservative	Carol Ann Hart	2,534	67.5
Labour	Michael Yates	555	14.8
Liberal Democrats	Robert Mark Mee	464	12.4
UKIP	Robert Vivian Wilson	200	5.3
Turnout		3,753	40
Conservative hold			

==== Breaston ====
Breaston (1 seat)
Party	Candidate	Votes	%
Conservative	Robert Alan Parkinson	2,389	60.2
Labour	Neil Barnes	937	23.6
UKIP	Caroline Susan Gent	252	6.4
Liberal Democrats	Martin Charles Garnett	244	6.1
Green	Brent Poland	146	3.7
Turnout		3,968	38.2
Conservative hold			

==== Ilkeston East ====
Ilkeston East (1 seat)
Party	Candidate	Votes	%
Conservative	Robert Frederick Flatley	1,116	41.8
Labour	James Dawson	1,031	38.6
UKIP	Frank Dunne	364	13.6
Liberal Democrats	Angela Togni	87	3.3
Green	Ralph Timothy Hierons	75	2.8
Turnout		2,673	27.6
Conservative gain from Labour			

==== Ilkeston South ====
Ilkeston South (1 seat)
Party	Candidate	Votes	%
Labour	John Arnold Frudd	1,182	44.8
Conservative	Jonathan William Wright	1,062	40.3
UKIP	Terry Calladine	213	8.1
Liberal Democrats	Stephen Andrew Hill	99	3.8
Green	Heather Hierons	82	3.1
Turnout		2,638	28.9
Labour hold			

==== Ilkeston West ====
Ilkeston West (1 seat)
Party	Candidate	Votes	%
Conservative	Tony King	1,560	48.3
Labour	Michelle Wendy Booth	1,270	39.3
UKIP	John Geehan	237	7.3
Liberal Democrats	Alex Richards	90	2.8
Independent	John William David Thomson	76	2.4
Turnout		3,233	33.8
Conservative gain from Labour			

==== Long Eaton ====
Long Eaton (1 seat)
Party	Candidate	Votes	%
Conservative	Alan Griffiths	1,469	44.2
Labour	Cheryl Pidgeon	1,334	40.1
UKIP	Peter Thomas Levesley	209	6.3
Green	Marie Crowley	139	4.2
Liberal Democrats	Jane Elizabeth Oseman	136	4.1
Independent	Roy Dunn	38	1.1
Turnout		3,325	34.1
Conservative gain from Labour			

==== Petersham ====
Petersham (1 seat)
Party	Candidate	Votes	%
Conservative	Garry Hickton	1,378	41.9
Labour	Caroline Elizabeth Louise Brown	1,228	37.4
Liberal Democrats	Becky Thomas	345	10.5
UKIP	Simon Gent	188	5.7
Green	Martin Gallimore	146	4.4
Turnout		3,285	32.9
Conservative gain from Labour			

==== Sandiacre ====
Sandiacre (1 seat)
Party	Candidate	Votes	%
Conservative	Wayne Stephen Major	2,064	58.4
Labour	Celia Jane Powers	852	24.1
Liberal Democrats	Steve Maxwell	380	10.8
UKIP	Gaynor Watts	141	4.0
Green	Maggie Gallimore	97	2.7
Turnout		3,534	37.5
Conservative hold			

==== Sawley ====
Sawley (1 seat)
Party	Candidate	Votes	%
Conservative	Kewal Singh Athwal	2,025	52.7
Labour	Alan Chewings	708	18.4
Liberal Democrats	Adam David Wain	450	11.7
Independent	Kristin Simmons	243	6.3
Independent	Sylvia Corsham	190	4.9
UKIP	Giles Farrand	152	4.0
Green	David Shipman	71	1.8
Turnout		3,839	40
Conservative hold			

=== High Peak Borough ===
(8 seats, 7 electoral divisions)

High Peak Borough Summary Result 2017
Party	Seats	Gains	Losses	Net gain/loss	Seats %	Votes %	Votes	+/−
Conservative	6	4	0	▲4	75	40.0	13,675	
Labour	1	0	3	▼3	12.5	36.3	12,418	
Liberal Democrats	1	0	1	▼1	12.5	17.6	5,997	
Green	0	0	0	Steady	0	5.0	1,715	
UKIP	0	0	0	Steady	0	1.1	364	

==== Buxton North and East ====
Buxton North & East (1 seat)
Party	Candidate	Votes	%
Conservative	Linda Grooby	1,327	44.0
Labour	Caitlin Bisknell	1,300	43.1
Liberal Democrats	Alistair Forbes	270	8.9
Green	Peter Crook	122	4.0
Turnout		3,028	34.16
Conservative gain from Labour			

==== Buxton West ====
Buxton West (1 seat)
Party	Candidate	Votes	%
Conservative	Tony Kemp	1,771	47.5
Labour	Matthew Stone	1,293	34.6
Liberal Democrats	Adam Scott	406	10.9
Green	Eileen Reynolds	262	7.0
Turnout		3,732	40.09
Conservative hold			

==== Chapel and Hope Valley ====
Chapel & Hope Valley (1 seat)
Party	Candidate	Votes	%
Conservative	Jim Perkins	1,791	45.0
Liberal Democrats	Charles Edward Lawley	1,100	27.6
Labour	Robert Ashley King	932	23.4
Green	Nat Stott	159	4.0
Turnout		3,982	42.54
Conservative hold			

==== Etherow ====
Etherow (1 seat)
Party	Candidate	Votes	%
Labour	Becki Woods	1,286	53.9
Conservative	Marcus Gerald Gill	875	36.7
Liberal Democrats	Alastair Murray Booth	139	5.8
Green	Sue Ledger	84	3.5
Turnout		2,384	28.84
Labour hold			

==== Glossop and Charlesworth ====
Glossop & Charlesworth (2 seats)
Party	Candidate	Votes	%
Conservative	George David Wharmby	2,911	22.4
Conservative	Jean Wharmby	2,834	21.8
Labour	Damien Greenhalgh	2,823	21.7
Labour	Sheila Yamin	2,410	18.5
Liberal Democrats	Stephen David Worrall	521	4.0
Green	Peter Duncan Allen	455	3.5
Liberal Democrats	Darcey Leigh Francis Gillie	380	2.9
UKIP	Christopher Michael Boyle	364	2.8
Green	Chris Cuff	299	2.3
Turnout		6,746	38.55
Conservative gain from Labour			
Conservative gain from Labour			

==== New Mills ====
New Mills (1 seat)
Party	Candidate	Votes	%
Liberal Democrats	Beth Atkins	1,889	44.9
Labour	Dave Gates	1,312	31.2
Conservative	Samantha Flower	833	19.8
Green	Mike Daw	177	4.2
Turnout		4,211	42.60
Liberal Democrats hold			

==== Whaley Bridge ====
Whaley Bridge (1 seat)
Party	Candidate	Votes	%
Conservative	Alison Fox	1,333	34.7
Liberal Democrats	David Lomax	1,292	33.6
Labour	Ruth George	1,062	27.6
Green	Mary Louisa Jones	157	4.1
Turnout		3,844	44.89
Conservative gain from Liberal Democrats			

=== North East Derbyshire District ===
(8 seats, 7 electoral divisions)

North East Derbyshire District Summary Result 2017
Party	Seats	Gains	Losses	Net gain/loss	Seats %	Votes %	Votes	+/−
Labour	5	0	1	▼1	62.5	39.8	12,630	
Conservative	3	1	0	▲1	37.5	43.8	13,907	
Liberal Democrats	0	0	0	Steady	0	9.2	2,933	
UKIP	0	0	0	Steady	0	7.1	2,246	

==== Clay Cross North ====
Clay Cross North (1 seat)
Party	Candidate	Votes	%
Labour	Brian Wright	1,263	39.6
Liberal Democrats	David Hancock	980	30.8
Conservative	William Armitage	732	23.0
UKIP	Alan Garfitt	211	6.6
Turnout		3,186	
Labour hold			

==== Clay Cross South ====
Clay Cross South (1 seat)
Party	Candidate	Votes	%
Labour	Kevin Gillott	1,896	60.1
Conservative	Linda Rowley	897	28.4
UKIP	Graham Michael Hutchinson	236	7.5
Liberal Democrats	Sam Gareth Jones	124	3.9
Turnout		3,153	
Labour hold			

==== Dronfield East ====
Dronfield East (1 seat)
Party	Candidate	Votes	%
Conservative	Alex Dale	2,141	56.6
Labour Co-op	Janet Anne Hill	1,295	34.2
Liberal Democrats	John Edward Ahern	205	5.4
UKIP	Gina Clarke	143	3.8
Turnout		3,784	
Conservative gain from Labour Co-op			

==== Dronfield West and Walton ====
Dronfield West & Walton (1 seat)
Party	Candidate	Votes	%
Conservative	Angelique Foster	2,868	65.3
Labour Co-op	Michael Gordon	893	20.3
Liberal Democrats	Martin Wilcock	346	7.9
UKIP	Adrian Lewis Clarke	284	6.5
Turnout		4,391	
Conservative hold			

==== Eckington and Killamarsh ====
Eckington & Killamarsh (2 seats)
Party	Candidate	Votes	%
Labour	Diane Winifred Evelyn Charles	2,360	22.9
Labour	Brian Ridgway	2,286	22.2
Conservative	Jeremy Alan Kenyon	2,109	20.4
Conservative	Richard David George Welton	1,883	18.3
UKIP	Cristian Gomez Reaney	503	4.9
Liberal Democrats	James Anthony Blundell	427	4.1
Liberal Democrats	Carmen Levick	388	3.8
UKIP	Beverley Molloy	359	3.5
Turnout		5,418	
Labour hold			
Labour hold			

==== Sutton ====
Sutton (1 seat)
Party	Candidate	Votes	%
Labour	Nigel Barker	1,454	53.8
Conservative	Andrew Jervis	820	30.3
UKIP	Robert Edward Molloy	277	10.2
Liberal Democrats	Jaimie Paul Barson	154	5.7
Turnout		2,705	
Labour hold			

==== Wingerworth and Shirland ====
Wingerworth & Shirland (1 seat)
Party	Candidate	Votes	%
Conservative	Barry Lewis	2,457	58.8
Labour	Barry Barnes	1,183	28.3
Liberal Democrats	Wendy Smalley	309	7.4
UKIP	Andrew John Briggs	233	5.6
Turnout		4,182	
Conservative hold			

=== South Derbyshire District ===
(8 seats, 8 electoral divisions)

South Derbyshire District Summary Result 2017
Party	Seats	Gains	Losses	Net gain/loss	Seats %	Votes %	Votes	+/−
Conservative	7	5	0	▲5	87.5	55.7	13,361	
Labour	1	0	5	▼5	12.5	31.4	7,528	
UKIP	0	0	0	Steady	0	6.3	1,507	
Liberal Democrats	0	0	0	Steady	0	6.3	1,500	
Green	0	0	0	Steady	0	0.4	85	

==== Aston ====
Aston (1 seat)
Party	Candidate	Votes	%
Conservative	Neil Kenneth Atkin	1,738	49.7
Labour	Rob Davison	1,359	38.8
UKIP	Ann Mary Graves	160	4.6
Liberal Democrats	John Hills	157	4.5
Green	Marten Kats	85	2.4
Turnout		3,499	
Conservative gain from Labour			

==== Etwall and Repton ====
Etwall & Repton (1 seat)
Party	Candidate	Votes	%
Conservative	Martyn Ford	2,632	68.1
Labour	John Campbell McCallum	677	17.5
Liberal Democrats	Annabelle Long	399	10.3
UKIP	Louise Jane Howells	159	4.1
Turnout		3,867	
Conservative hold			

==== Hilton ====
Hilton (1 seat)
Party	Candidate	Votes	%
Conservative	Julie Elizabeth Patten	1,847	63.6
Labour	Steve Cooper	692	23.8
Liberal Democrats	Claire Marie Jaqueline Portejoie	188	6.5
UKIP	Ben Stokes	176	6.1
Turnout		2,903	
Conservative hold			

==== Linton ====
Linton (1 seat)
Party	Candidate	Votes	%
Conservative	Patrick Joseph Murray	1,751	59.1
Labour	Toni Ann Rogers	914	30.9
UKIP	Barry Appleby	152	5.1
Liberal Democrats	Lorraine Karen Johnson	144	4.9
Turnout		2,961	
Conservative gain from Labour			

==== Melbourne ====
Melbourne (1 seat)
Party	Candidate	Votes	%
Conservative	Linda Mary Chilton	2,317	65.9
Labour	Neil Anthony Tilley	703	20.0
Liberal Democrats	John James	319	9.1
UKIP	Martin Batteson	178	5.1
Turnout		3,517	
Conservative hold			

==== Swadlincote Central ====
Swadlincote Central (1 seat)
Party	Candidate	Votes	%
Conservative	Gary Stephen Musson	1,092	43.6
Labour	Paul Dunn	981	39.2
UKIP	Mike Dawson	298	11.9
Liberal Democrats	Rebecca Jane Wilkinson	132	5.3
Turnout		2,503	
Conservative gain from Labour			

==== Swadlincote North ====
Swadlincote North (1 seat)
Party	Candidate	Votes	%
Labour	Sean Andrew Bambrick	1,174	50.7
Conservative	Ann Watson	886	38.2
UKIP	Martin Fitzpatrick	186	8.0
Liberal Democrats	Richard Francis Tyler	68	2.9
Turnout		2,314	
Labour hold			

==== Swadlincote South ====
Swadlincote South (1 seat)
Party	Candidate	Votes	%
Conservative	Stuart Thomas Swann	1,098	45.4
Labour	Trevor Southerd	1,028	42.5
UKIP	Alice Emily Stott	198	8.2
Liberal Democrats	Tim Collingwood	93	3.8
Turnout		2,417	
Conservative gain from Labour			

== By-Elections between May 2017 - May 2021 ==
=== Whaley Bridge ===
Whaley Bridge By-Election 13 February 2020
Party	Candidate	Votes	%	±%
Labour	Ruth George	1,851	50.4	
Conservative	John Frederick Walton	1,048	28.5	
Liberal Democrats	David William Lomax	721	19.6	
Independent	Paddy Bann	52	1.4	
Turnout		3,672		
Labour gain from Conservative		Swing		
