= 2021 Derbyshire County Council election =

2021 UK local government election

- 6 May 2021

All 64 seats to Derbyshire County Council 33 seats needed for a majority
	First party	Second party	Third party
Party	Conservative	Labour	Liberal Democrats
Last election	37	24	3
Seats won	45	14	4
Seat change	▲8	▼10	▲1
Popular vote	116,184	80,611	21,950
Percentage	47.8%	33.2%	9.0%
Swing	▲15,610	▼2,811	▼4,312
	Fourth party
Party	Green
Last election	0
Seats won	1
Seat change	▲1
Popular vote	18,339
Percentage	7.6%
Swing	▲13,560
- Map showing the results of the 2021 Derbyshire County Council election

- Council composition after the election
Leader before election
Barry Lewis
Conservative
Leader after election
Barry Lewis
Conservative

The 2021 Derbyshire County Council election took place alongside the other 2021 local elections. All 64 seats to Derbyshire County Council were contested. The Conservatives retained control of the council with an increased majority. In addition, the Green Party gained representation for the first time.

== Candidates ==
Former MPs Ruth George and Edwina Currie stood against each other in Whaley Bridge with Ruth George emerging victorious. George lost her High Peak seat in 2019 and Currie lost her South Derbyshire seat in 1997.

== Summary ==
=== Election result ===
2021 Derbyshire County Council election
Party	Candidates	Seats	Gains	Losses	Net gain/loss	Seats %	Votes %	Votes	+/−
Conservative	64	45	12	4	▲8	70.0	47.8	116,184	+3.9
Labour	62	14	3	13	▼10	21.9	33.2	80,611	–3.3
Liberal Democrats	55	4	2	1	▲1	6.3	9.0	21,950	–2.5
Green	43	1	1	0	▲1	1.6	7.6	18,339	+5.4
Independent	14	0	0	0	Steady	0.0	1.8	4,452	±0.0
Chesterfield Independents	5	0	0	0	Steady	0.0	0.3	660	N/A
Reform	6	0	0	0	Steady	0.0	0.2	515	N/A
TUSC	4	0	0	0	Steady	0.0	0.2	374	N/A
UKIP	1	0	0	0	Steady	0.0	<0.1	47	–4.2

== Division results ==
=== Amber Valley ===
(10 seats, 9 electoral divisions)

Amber Valley Summary Result 2021
Party	Seats	Gains	Losses	Net gain/loss	Seats %	Votes %	Votes	+/−
Conservative	9	2	1	▲1	90.00	52.8	22,814	+4.1
Labour	0	0	2	▼2	0.00	30.5	13,196	-6.6
Green	1	1	0	▲1	10.00	13.0	5,623	+8.7
Liberal Democrats	0	0	0	Steady	0.00	3.6	1,567	-0.8

Alfreton and Somercotes
Party	Candidate	Votes	%	±%
Conservative	Philip Rose	3,185	51.0	
Conservative	David Wilson	2,791		
Labour	Paul Smith	2,237	35.8	
Labour	Steve Marshall-Clarke	2,136		
Green	Steve Elliott	599	9.6	
Green	Leo Swarvett	301		
Liberal Democrats	Paul Slater	219	3.5	
Liberal Democrats	Kate Kift	182		
Majority				
Turnout				
Conservative gain from Labour		Swing		
Conservative gain from Labour		Swing		

Alport and Derwent
Party	Candidate	Votes	%	±%
Conservative	David Taylor	2,620	52.3	−5.6
Labour	Ben Bellamy	1,517	30.3	+1.9
Green	Rachael Hatchett	671	13.4	+7.0
Liberal Democrats	Michael Heap	206	4.1	−3.4
Majority		1,103	22.0	
Conservative hold				

Belper
Party	Candidate	Votes	%	±%
Conservative	John Nelson	1,665	43.1	−3.2
Labour	Emma Monkman	1,497	38.8	−4.1
Green	Julie Wozniczka	423	11.0	+4.9
Liberal Democrats	John Morrissey	277	7.2	+2.5
Majority		168	4.3	
Turnout				
Conservative hold				

Duffield and Belper South
Party	Candidate	Votes	%	±%
Green	Gez Kinsella	2,277	50.7	+38.9
Conservative	Chris Short	1,569	34.9	−12.9
Labour	Joel Bryan	514	11.4	−12.6
Liberal Democrats	Sue Allen	134	3.0	−3.7
Majority		708	15.8	
Green gain from Conservative		Swing		

Greater Heanor
Party	Candidate	Votes	%	±%
Conservative	Alexander Stevenson	2,049	66.3	+18.4
Labour	Suqie Banwait	734	23.8	−15.0
Green	Cathie Hallsworth	211	6.8	+4.6
Liberal Democrats	Jerry Marler	96	3.1	+0.7
Majority		1315	39.5	
Conservative hold				

Heanor Central
Party	Candidate	Votes	%	±%
Conservative	Richard Iliffe	1,897	59.1	+15.5
Labour	Paul Jones	1011	31.5	−9.5
Green	Tina Pritchard	206	6.4	+4.7
Liberal Democrats	Michelle Belsom	94	2.9	−0.9
Majority		886	27.6	
Conservative hold				

Horsley
Party	Candidate	Votes	%	±%
Conservative	Trevor Ainsworth	2,637	62.9	−1.2
Labour	Matthew Jones	966	23.0	+0.2
Green	Matt McGuinness	453	10.8	+7.8
Liberal Democrats	Gemma Quinton	135	3.2	−1.6
Majority		1671	39.9	
Conservative hold				

Ripley East and Codnor
Party	Candidate	Votes	%	±%
Conservative	Ron Ashton	2,039	58.3	+6.1
Labour	Tony Holmes	1188	33.9	−4.5
Green	Jamie Walls	168	4.8	+2.6
Liberal Democrats	Kate Smith	105	3.0	+1.1
Majority		851	24.4	
Conservative hold				

Ripley West and Heage
Party	Candidate	Votes	%	±%
Conservative	Paul Moss	2,362	56.4	+4.9
Labour	Paul Lobley	1396	33.3	−5.3
Green	Michael Bedford	314	7.5	+4.8
Liberal Democrats	Paul Smith	119	2.8	−0.7
Majority		966	23.1	
Conservative hold				

=== Bolsover ===
Barlborough and Clowne
Party	Candidate	Votes	%	±%
Conservative	Natalie Hoy	1,710	55.6	+18.6
Labour	Patricia Clough	1,222	39.7	−18.3
Liberal Democrats	Benjamin Marshall	143	4.7	−0.4
Majority		488		
Conservative gain from Labour				

Bolsover North
Party	Candidate	Votes	%	±%
Labour	Mick Yates	1,180	41.3	−16.4
Conservative	Matthew Hoy	865	30.3	+1.1
Independent	Peter Roberts	359	12.6	N/A
Independent	Martin Sanders	275	9.6	N/A
TUSC	Elaine Evans	108	3.8	−2.8
Liberal Democrats	Samuel Kay	67	2.3	−4.2
Majority		315		
Labour hold				

Bolsover South
Party	Candidate	Votes	%	±%
Labour	Joan Dixon	1,375	47.3	−5.3
Conservative	Ryan Cook	1,241	42.7	+9.3
Liberal Democrats	Steve Raison	166	5.7	−0.3
TUSC	Jonathan Dale	127	4.4	−3.6
Majority		134		
Labour hold				

Shirebrook and Pleasley
Party	Candidate	Votes	%	±%
Labour	Christine Dale	1,303	56.0	+7.6
Conservative	Slywester Zwierzynski	770	33.1	+16.1
Liberal Democrats	Helen Oakton	155	6.7	+0.9
TUSC	David Murray	98	4.2	N/A
Majority		533		
Labour hold				

South Normanton and Pinxton
Party	Candidate	Votes	%	±%
Conservative	Julian Siddle	1,307	47.0	+14.6
Labour	Jim Coyle	1,124	40.4	−5.5
Independent	Andrew Joesbury	254	9.1	N/A
Liberal Democrats	John Wilcock	56	2.0	−5.9
TUSC	Brian Loader	41	1.5	N/A
Majority		183		
Conservative gain from Labour				

Tibshelf
Party	Candidate	Votes	%	±%
Conservative	James Barron	1,256	37.7	+7.5
Labour	Clive Moesby	1,234	37.0	−15.1
Independent	Debbie Marshall-Curtis	582	17.5	N/A
Green	Nick Avis	206	6.2	N/A
Liberal Democrats	Morgan Leggett	53	1.6	−4.5
Majority		22		
Conservative gain from Labour				

=== Chesterfield ===
Birdholme
Party	Candidate	Votes	%	±%
Labour	Dave Allen	1,372	51.1	−8.1
Conservative	Paul Gibbons	881	32.8	+5.6
Green	Darren Yates	235	8.7	N/A
Liberal Democrats	Amanda Brassington	117	4.4	−9.2
Chesterfield Independents	Kathryn Berridge	63	2.3	N/A
Independent	Dean Rhodes	18	0.7	N/A
Majority		491		
Labour hold				

Boythorpe and Brampton South
Party	Candidate	Votes	%	±%
Labour	Ron Mihaly	1,331	42.5	−3.1
Liberal Democrats	Keith Falconer	1,011	32.3	−5.6
Conservative	Heather Liggett	548	17.5	+1.0
Green	David Wadsworth	160	5.1	N/A
Chesterfield Independents	Theresa Powell	81	2.6	N/A
Majority		320		
Labour hold				

Brimington
Party	Candidate	Votes	%	±%
Labour	Dean Collins	1,577	56.1	−2.5
Conservative	Barry Thompson	803	28.6	+4.8
Liberal Democrats	Shirley Niblock	184	6.5	−2.8
Independent	Carl Chambers	167	5.9	N/A
Independent	Ruth Perry	81	2.9	N/A
Majority		774		
Labour hold				

Loundsley Green and Newbold
Party	Candidate	Votes	%	±%
Liberal Democrats	Ed Fordham	1,358	39.4	+11.0
Labour	Mick Wall	1,284	37.3	−10.0
Conservative	Sanjoy Sen	638	18.5	−0.8
Chesterfield Independents	David Jones	165	4.8	−0.3
Majority		74		
Liberal Democrats gain from Labour				

Spire
Party	Candidate	Votes	%	±%
Labour	Ludwig Ramsey	1,127	47.4	−7.7
Conservative	Oliver Scheidt	619	26.0	+4.0
Liberal Democrats	Adrian Mather	441	18.5	+8.1
Green	Andy Barton	193	8.1	N/A
Majority		508		
Labour hold				

St Mary's
Party	Candidate	Votes	%	±%
Labour	Jean Innes	1,248	44.2	−6.1
Conservative	Amy Dale	867	30.7	+8.0
Liberal Democrats	Tony Rogers	452	16.0	+1.8
Chesterfield Independents	Paul Stone	259	9.2	N/A
Majority		381		
Labour hold				

Staveley
Party	Candidate	Votes	%	±%
Labour	Anne-Frances Hayes	832	31.1	−21.2
Independent	Paul Mann	785	29.4	N/A
Independent	Mick Bagshaw	555	20.8	−0.1
Conservative	Niall Hopkinson	500	18.7	−0.7
Majority		47		
Labour hold				

Staveley North and Whittington
Party	Candidate	Votes	%	±%
Liberal Democrats	Barry Bingham	1,560	53.4	+10.3
Labour	Marion Thorpe	724	24.8	−15.6
Conservative	Adam Parrish	545	18.7	+2.1
Chesterfield Independents	Colin Stimson	92	3.1	N/A
Majority		836		
Liberal Democrats hold				

Walton and West
Party	Candidate	Votes	%	±%
Liberal Democrats	Paul Niblock	1,508	38.1	+2.2
Conservative	John Boult	1,446	36.6	−2.8
Labour	Stephen Lismore	759	19.2	−5.4
Green	Simon Geikie	241	6.1	N/A
Majority		62		
Liberal Democrats gain from Conservative				

=== Derbyshire Dales ===
Ashbourne
Party	Candidate	Votes	%	±%
Conservative	Steve Bull	3,013	67.0	−6.4
Liberal Democrats	Peter Dobbs	541	12.0	−7.9
Green	John Hill	474	10.5	N/A
Labour	Nick Whitehead	470	10.4	N/A
Majority		2,472		
Conservative hold				

Bakewell
Party	Candidate	Votes	%	±%
Conservative	Alasdair Sutton	2,575	52.8	−7.9
Labour	Peter O'Brien	2,298	47.2	+21.9
Majority		277		
Conservative hold				

Derwent Valley
Party	Candidate	Votes	%	±%
Conservative	Susan Hobson	2,320	54.8	−1.9
Liberal Democrats	Claire Cadogan	1,910	45.2	+30.2
Majority		410		
Conservative hold				

Dovedale
Party	Candidate	Votes	%	±%
Conservative	Simon Spencer	2,261	60.0	+13.0
Green	Neil Buttle	1,510	40.0	+36.6
Majority		751		
Conservative hold				

Matlock
Party	Candidate	Votes	%	±%
Liberal Democrats	Sue Burfoot	2,350	57.8	+15.5
Conservative	Valerie Taylor	861	21.2	−9.7
Labour	Trevor Page	621	15.3	−11.5
Green	Christabel Holland	235	5.8	N/A
Majority		1,489		
Liberal Democrats hold				

Wirksworth
Party	Candidate	Votes	%	±%
Conservative	Dermot Murphy	1,993	42.3	−2.0
Labour	Diane Fletcher	1,826	38.8	−6.2
Green	John Ward	491	10.4	+5.0
Independent	Richard Bright	214	4.5	−39.8
Liberal Democrats	Paul Cruise	185	3.9	−1.8
Majority		167		
Conservative gain from Labour				

=== Erewash ===
(9 seats, 9 electoral divisions)

Erewash Summary Result 2021
Party	Seats	Gains	Losses	Net gain/loss	Seats %	Votes %	Votes	+/−
Conservative	9	1	0	▲1	100	54.7	17,323	+3.1
Labour	0	0	1	▼1	0	29.8	9,429	-0.2
Green	0	0	0	Steady	0	7.7	2,453	+5.2
Liberal Democrats	0	0	0	Steady	0	7.1	2,238	-0.5
Reform	0	0	0	Steady	0	0.8	245	N/A

Breadsall and West Hallam
Party	Candidate	Votes	%	±%
Conservative	Carol Hart	2,353	57.2	−10.3
Liberal Democrats	Robert Mee	976	23.7	+11.3
Labour	Ian Wilson	694	16.9	+2.1
Reform	David Adams	91	2.2	N/A
Majority		1,377		
Conservative hold				

Breaston
Party	Candidate	Votes	%	±%
Conservative	Robert Parkinson	2,619	59.7	−0.5
Green	Brent Poland	942	21.5	+17.8
Labour	Adam Thompson	823	18.8	−4.8
Majority		1,677		
Conservative hold				

Ilkeston East
Party	Candidate	Votes	%	±%
Conservative	Robert Flatley	1,399	52.2	+10.8
Labour	Geoff Stratford	1,041	38.8	+0.2
Green	Zee Sheldon	179	6.7	+3.9
Liberal Democrats	Kristopher Watts	62	2.3	−1.0
Majority		358		
Conservative hold				

Ilkeston South
Party	Candidate	Votes	%	±%
Conservative	Aaron Gibson	1,401	48.6	+8.3
Labour	James Dawson	1,217	42.3	−2.5
Green	Heather Hierons	168	5.8	+2.7
Liberal Democrats	Angela Togni	94	3.3	−0.5
Majority		184		
Conservative gain from Labour				

Ilkeston West
Party	Candidate	Votes	%	±%
Conservative	Tony King	1,919	57.2	+8.9
Labour	Dan Whittle	1,154	34.4	−4.9
Green	Abbie Monaghan	206	6.1	N/A
Liberal Democrats	Jennifer Smith	76	2.3	−0.5
Majority		765		
Conservative hold				

Long Eaton
Party	Candidate	Votes	%	±%
Conservative	Alan Griffiths	1,685	50.0	+5.8
Labour	Gordon Thomas	1,215	36.1	−4.0
Green	Lee Fletcher	265	7.9	+3.7
Liberal Democrats	Rachel Allen	204	6.1	+2.0
Majority		470		
Conservative hold				

Petersham
Party	Candidate	Votes	%	±%
Conservative	Garry Hickton	1,631	44.3	+2.4
Labour	Laurie Morgen	1,241	33.7	−3.7
Green	Charlotte Land	319	8.7	+4.3
Liberal Democrats	Jane Oseman	236	6.4	−4.1
Majority		390		
Conservative hold				

Sandiacre
Party	Candidate	Votes	%	±%
Conservative	Wayne Major	2,281	62.0	+3.6
Labour	Celia Powers	973	26.5	+2.4
Green	Ashley Dunn	224	6.1	+3.4
Liberal Democrats	Susannah Watts	133	3.6	−7.2
Reform	Gaynor Watts	67	1.8	−2.2
Majority		1,308		
Conservative hold				

Sawley
Party	Candidate	Votes	%	±%
Conservative	Kewal Athwal	2,035	53.6	+0.9
Labour	Denise Bond	1,071	28.2	+9.8
Liberal Democrats	James Archer	457	12.0	+0.3
Green	Stephanie Dunn	150	3.9	+2.1
Reform	Jo Homer	87	2.3	N/A
Majority		964		
Conservative hold				

=== High Peak ===
Buxton North and East
Party	Candidate	Votes	%	±%
Conservative	Lindy Grooby	1,559	48.8	+4.8
Labour	Caitlin Bisknell	1,350	42.3	−0.8
Green	Peter Crook	182	5.7	+1.7
Reform	Chris Gould	65	2.0	N/A
Liberal Democrats	Chris Weaver	39	1.2	−7.7
Majority		209		
Conservative hold				

Buxton West
Party	Candidate	Votes	%	±%
Conservative	Tony Kemp	1,900	46.2	−1.3
Labour	David Newton	1,693	41.2	+6.6
Green	Eileen Reynolds	351	8.5	+1.5
Liberal Democrats	Stan Heptinstall	170	4.1	−6.8
Majority		207		
Conservative hold				

Chapel and Hope Valley
Party	Candidate	Votes	%	±%
Conservative	Nigel Gourlay	2,025	46.9	+1.9
Green	Joanna Collins	907	21.0	+17.0
Labour	Phil Harrison	885	20.5	−2.9
Independent	Paddy Bann	395	9.2	N/A
Liberal Democrats	James Patterson	102	2.4	−25.2
Majority		1,118	25.9	+8.5
Conservative hold				

Etherow
Party	Candidate	Votes	%	±%
Labour	Becki Woods	1,243	47.2	−6.7
Conservative	Thomas Wynne	1,119	42.5	+5.8
Green	Robert Hodgetts-Haley	178	6.8	+3.3
Liberal Democrats	Charles Jevon	49	1.9	−3.9
UKIP	Christopher Boyle	47	1.8	N/A
Labour hold				
Majority		124		

Glossop and Charlesworth
Party	Candidate	Votes	%	±%
Labour	Damien Greenhalgh	3,670	45.9	
Conservative	Jean Wharmby	3,509	43.9	
Labour	Gerry Dominey	3,339	41.8	
Conservative	Dom Starkey	3,149	39.4	
Green	Robyn Summers	849	10.6	
Liberal Democrats	Stephen Worrall	539	6.7	
Majority				
Labour gain from Conservative				
Conservative hold				

New Mills
Party	Candidate	Votes	%	±%
Labour	Anne Clarke	1,841	43.8	+12.6
Liberal Democrats	Beth Atkins	1,190	28.3	−16.6
Conservative	Tony Ashton	932	22.1	+2.3
Green	Matthew Patterson	245	5.8	+1.6
Majority		651		
Labour gain from Liberal Democrats				

Whaley Bridge
Party	Candidate	Votes	%	±%
Labour	Ruth George	2,544	51.9	+24.3
Conservative	Edwina Currie	1,878	38.3	+3.6
Liberal Democrats	David Lomax	340	6.9	−26.7
Green	Lucas Jones	138	2.8	−1.3
Majority		666	13.6	N/A
Labour gain from Conservative				

=== North East Derbyshire ===
Clay Cross North
Party	Candidate	Votes	%	±%
Conservative	Charlotte Cupit	1,684	48.6	+25.6
Labour	Janet Hill	1,084	31.3	−8.3
Liberal Democrats	Ross Shipman	695	20.1	−10.7
Majority		600		
Conservative gain from Labour				

Clay Cross South
Party	Candidate	Votes	%	±%
Labour	Kevin Gillott	1,820	54.7	−5.4
Conservative	William Armitage	1,320	39.7	+11.3
Liberal Democrats	Julia Vongyer	112	3.4	−0.5
Reform	Dave Jones	77	2.3	N/A
Majority		500		
Labour hold				

Dronfield East
Party	Candidate	Votes	%	±%
Conservative	Alex Dale	2,273	59.3	+2.7
Labour	Roland Lovatt	989	25.8	−8.4
Liberal Democrats	Simon Temple	364	9.5	+4.1
Green	Carly Radford	207	5.4	N/A
Majority		1,284		
Conservative hold				

Dronfield West and Walton
Party	Candidate	Votes	%	±%
Conservative	Angelique Foster	3,171	68.3	+3.0
Labour	David Cheetham	1,150	24.8	+4.5
Liberal Democrats	Emma Harpham	324	7.0	−0.9
Majority		221	43.5	
Conservative hold				

Eckington and Killamarsh
Party	Candidate	Votes	%	±%
Conservative	Mark Foster	3,324	52.4	
Conservative	Carolyn Renwick	3,152	49.7	
Labour	Steve Pickering	2,144	33.8	
Labour	Anne Clarke	1,994	31.4	
Liberal Democrats	Mark Firth	517	8.2	
Liberal Democrats	Alan Marshall	391	6.2	
Independent	John Rose	171	2.7	
Majority				
Conservative gain from Labour				
Conservative gain from Labour				

Sutton
Party	Candidate	Votes	%	±%
Conservative	Jack Woolley	1,420	46.8	+16.5
Labour	Nigel Barker	1,272	42.0	−11.8
Green	Emily Main	178	5.9	N/A
Independent	Kieron Payne	97	3.2	N/A
Liberal Democrats	Blaine Uknighted	64	2.1	−3.6
Majority		148		
Conservative gain from Labour				

Wingerworth and Shirland
Party	Candidate	Votes	%	±%
Conservative	Barry Lewis	2,536	55.4	−3.4
Green	Frank Adlington-Stringer	1,086	23.7	N/A
Labour	Ross Griffin	768	16.8	−11.5
Liberal Democrats	Camille Ramshaw	187	4.1	−3.3
Majority		1,450		
Conservative hold				

=== South Derbyshire ===
Aston
Party	Candidate	Votes	%	±%
Conservative	Neil Atkin	2,092	53.8	+4.1
Labour	Iain Wilson	1,257	32.3	−6.5
Green	Caroline Scott	281	7.2	+4.8
Liberal Democrats	John Hills	133	3.4	−1.1
Reform	Alan Graves	128	3.3	−1.3
Majority		835		
Conservative hold		Swing		

Etwall and Repton
Party	Candidate	Votes	%	±%
Conservative	Martyn Ford	2,889	62.5	−5.6
Labour	John McCallum	921	19.9	+2.4
Green	Amanda Baker	576	12.5	N/A
Liberal Democrats	Stephen Hardwick	237	5.1	−5.2
Majority		1,968		
Conservative hold				

Hilton
Party	Candidate	Votes	%	±%
Conservative	Julie Patten	1,985	65.1	+1.5
Labour	Julie Jackson	541	17.7	−6.1
Liberal Democrats	Grahame Andrew	275	9.0	+2.5
Green	Martin Wall	247	8.1	N/A
Majority		1,444		
Conservative hold				

Linton
Party	Candidate	Votes	%	±%
Conservative	Stuart Swann	1,477	45.9	−13.2
Labour	Dan Pegg	985	30.6	−0.3
Independent	Amy Wheelton	753	23.4	N/A
Majority		492		
Conservative hold				

Melbourne
Party	Candidate	Votes	%	±%
Conservative	David du Celiee Muller	1,792	50.0	−15.9
Labour	Jane Carroll	862	24.1	+4.1
Green	Jonathan Wood	770	21.5	N/A
Liberal Democrats	Thomas James	160	4.5	−4.6
Majority		930		
Conservative hold				

Swadlincote Central
Party	Candidate	Votes	%	±%
Conservative	Gary Musson	1,304	55.4	+11.8
Labour	Alan Jones	932	39.6	+0.4
Green	Sylvia Dearing	116	4.9	N/A
Majority		372		
Conservative hold				

Swadlincote North
Party	Candidate	Votes	%	±%
Conservative	Peter Smith	1,081	52.0	+13.8
Labour	Sean Bambrick	997	48.0	−2.7
Majority		84		
Conservative gain from Labour				

Swadlincote South
Party	Candidate	Votes	%	±%
Conservative	Roger Redfern	1,457	59.2	+13.8
Labour	Louise Mulgrew	798	32.4	−10.1
Green	Jude Boynton	207	8.4	N/A
Majority		659		
Conservative hold				

== Changes 2021–2025 ==
In March 2023, Philip Rose and Alex Stevenson, both of whom had been elected as Conservatives, defected to Reform UK. In January 2025 they left and became Independents. In May 2024, Nigel Gourlay was suspended by the Conservatives before resigning from the party and becoming an Independent.

=== Long Eaton ===
Long Eaton By-Election 27 October 2022
Party	Candidate	Votes	%	±%
Labour Co-op	Joel Bryan	1,104	51.1	+15.0
Conservative	Chris Page	723	33.5	−16.5
Liberal Democrats	Rachel Allen	239	11.1	+5.0
Green	Ashley Dunn	94	4.4	−3.5
Turnout		2,160		
Labour Co-op gain from Conservative		Swing		

The Long Eaton by-election was triggered by the death of Conservative councillor Alan Griffiths in July 2022.

=== Swadlincote South ===
Swadlincote South By-Election 31 August 2023
Party	Candidate	Votes	%	±%
Labour	Alan Haynes	786	62.2	+29.4
Conservative	Jacqueline Geddes	477	37.8	−21.4
Turnout		1263		
Labour gain from Conservative		Swing		

The Swadlincote South by-election was triggered by the death of Conservative councillor Roger Redfern.
