= High Peak Borough Council elections =

Local government elections in Derbyshire, England

High Peak Borough Council elections are held every four years. High Peak Borough Council is the local authority for the non-metropolitan district of High Peak in Derbyshire, England. Since the last boundary changes in 2015, 43 councillors have been elected from 28 wards.

== Council elections ==
- 1973 High Peak Borough Council election
- 1976 High Peak Borough Council election
- 1979 High Peak Borough Council election (New ward boundaries reduced the number of seats by 2)
- 1983 High Peak Borough Council election
- 1987 High Peak Borough Council election
- 1991 High Peak Borough Council election (Borough boundary changes took place but the number of seats remained the same)
- 1995 High Peak Borough Council election (Borough boundary changes took place but the number of seats remained the same)
- 1999 High Peak Borough Council election
- 2003 High Peak Borough Council election (New ward boundaries reduced the number of seats by 1)
- 2007 High Peak Borough Council election
- 2011 High Peak Borough Council election
- 2015 High Peak Borough Council election (New ward boundaries)
- 2019 High Peak Borough Council election
- 2023 High Peak Borough Council election

== Council composition ==
Year	Conservative	Labour	Liberal Democrats	Liberal	Glossop Independent	Green	Independent	Control
1973	23	11	-	2	-	-	10	No overall control
1976	27	8	-	2	-	-	9	Conservative
1979	22	12	-	2	-	-	8	No overall control
1983	18	14	-	2	-	-	10	No overall control
1987	17	11	-	7	-	-	9	No overall control
1991	14	16	10	-	-	0	4	No overall control
1995	5	30	5	-	-	0	4	Labour
1999	10	27	5	-	-	0	2	Labour
2003	12	18	7	-	2	0	4	No overall control
2007	24	9	6	-	0	0	4	Conservative
2011	15	21	3	-	0	0	4	No overall control
2015	23	17	2	-	0	0	1	Conservative
2019	16	22	3	-	0	2	0	Labour
2023	10	29	1	-	0	2	1	Labour

== Results maps ==
2003 results map

2007 results map

2011 results map

2015 results map

2019 results map

2023 results map

== By-election results ==
=== 1995-1999 ===
Barmoor By-Election 6 March 1997
Party	Candidate	Votes	%	±%
Liberal Democrats		220	53.5	
Labour		191	46.5	
Majority		29	7.0	
Turnout		411	38.8	
Liberal Democrats gain from Independent		Swing		

New Mills South By-Election 1 May 1997
Party	Candidate	Votes	%	±%
Labour		1,038	44.1	−11.5
Liberal Democrats		787	33.4	−3.3
Conservative		528	22.4	+14.7
Majority		251	10.7	
Turnout		2,353		
Labour hold		Swing		

Blackbrook By-Election 23 April 1998
Party	Candidate	Votes	%	±%
Liberal Democrats		578	50.8	−1.8
Conservative		405	35.6	+9.6
Labour		155	13.6	−7.8
Majority		178	15.2	
Turnout		1,138	38.9	
Liberal Democrats hold		Swing		

St Johns By-Election 2 July 1998
Party	Candidate	Votes	%	±%
Conservative	Anne Worrall	414	48.7	+9.6
Liberal Democrats		329	38.7	+11.3
Labour		107	12.6	−20.6
Majority		85	10.0	
Turnout		850	42.4	
Conservative hold		Swing		

=== 1999-2003 ===
St. James By-Election 30 September 1999
Party	Candidate	Votes	%	±%
Labour		414	41.0	−3.7
Conservative	George Wharmby	383	38.5	+5.7
Liberal Democrats		197	19.8	−2.0
Majority		31	2.5	
Turnout		994	22.7	
Labour hold		Swing		

=== 2003-2007 ===
Sett By-Election 23 October 2003
Party	Candidate	Votes	%	±%
Conservative	Anthony Ashton	201	34.8	−20.1
Liberal Democrats	Trevor Jefcoate	193	33.4	+33.4
Labour	Alan Barrow	183	31.7	+2.3
Majority		8	1.4	
Turnout		577	35.0	
Conservative hold		Swing		

Howard Town By-Election 16 September 2004
Party	Candidate	Votes	%	±%
Labour	Roger Wilkinson	270	36.7	+2.6
Conservative	George David Wharmby	167	22.7	+0.7
Respect	Shaw	107	14.6	+14.6
Glossop Independent Party	Amanda Jane Whitehead	103	14.0	−18.7
Liberal Democrats	Peter John Michael William Beard	88	12.0	+12.0
Majority		103	14.0	
Turnout		735	22.8	
Labour hold		Swing		

Simmondley By-Election 16 September 2004
Party	Candidate	Votes	%	±%
Liberal Democrats	Goinden (George) Kuppan	382	40.2	−0.6
Conservative	Andrew Richardson	244	25.7	−1.3
Labour	Barbara Anne Hastings-Asatourian	196	20.6	−11.6
Glossop Independent Party	Neil Johnstone	96	10.1	+10.1
Respect	Aldridge	32	3.4	+3.4
Majority		138	14.5	
Turnout		950	26.1	
Liberal Democrats gain from Labour		Swing		

New Mills West By-Election 5 May 2005
Party	Candidate	Votes	%	±%
Liberal Democrats	Steven Sharpe	925	41.7	
Labour	Lancelot Edgar Dowson	784	35.4	
Conservative	Christopher John Saunders	508	22.9	
Majority		141	6.3	
Turnout		2,217	68.5	
Liberal Democrats hold		Swing		

Dinting By-Election 15 September 2005
Party	Candidate	Votes	%	±%
Conservative	Jean Wharmby	322	58.5	+3.7
Labour	Stephen Eichhorn	128	23.3	−4.0
Liberal Democrats	Marc Godwin	100	18.2	+0.3
Majority		194	35.2	
Turnout		550	37.2	
Conservative hold		Swing		

Whitfield By-Election 15 September 2005
Party	Candidate	Votes	%	±%
Labour	Eleanor Wilcox	212	52.7	+12.0
Liberal Democrats	Linda Walker	135	33.6	+33.6
Conservative	Matthew James Andrew Crompton	55	13.7	+13.7
Majority		77	19.1	
Turnout		402	24.9	
Labour gain from Independent		Swing		

=== 2007-2011 ===
Tintwistle By-Election 22 October 2009
Party	Candidate	Votes	%	±%
Conservative	William Clarke	339	69.2	+14.3
Labour	Joyce Brocklehurst	111	22.7	−22.5
Liberal Democrats	Maureen Hargreaves	40	8.2	+8.2
Majority		228	46.5	
Turnout		490	28.8	
Conservative hold		Swing		

Blackbrook By-Election 26 November 2009
Party	Candidate	Votes	%	±%
Liberal Democrats	Edith Longden	689	56.9	+16.5
Conservative	Geoffrey Colston	470	38.8	−20.8
Labour	Fiona Sloman	52	4.3	+4.3
Majority		219	18.1	
Turnout		1,211	35.6	
Liberal Democrats gain from Conservative		Swing		

New Mills West By-Election 06 May 2010
Party	Candidate	Votes	%	±%
Liberal Democrats	Janet Maria Carter	819	33.8	
Conservative	Jacqui Gadd	647	26.7	
Labour	Alan Barrow	504	20.8	
Independent	Lance Dowson	235	9.7	
Green	Hazel May Body	218	9.0	
Majority		172	7.1	
Turnout		2,423	71.31	+27.87
Liberal Democrats hold		Swing		

=== 2011-2015 ===
Buxton Central By-Election 29 March 2012
Party	Candidate	Votes	%	±%
Labour	Jean Marion Todd	416	44.88	−0.22
Conservative	Robert George Morris	396	42.71	+6.70
Liberal Democrats	Derek John Webb	70	7.55	−4.40
Independent	Louise Maria Glasscoe	42	4.53	+4.53
Majority		20	2.16	
Turnout		927	26.74	−9.44
Labour hold		Swing	-3.46	

=== 2015-2019 ===
Limestone Peak By-Election 09 November 2017
Party	Candidate	Votes	%	±%
Conservative	Peter Nigel Roberts	261	53.59	+3.76
Labour	Jim Lambert	133	27.31	+0.79
Liberal Democrats	Alistair MacPhail Forbes	58	11.91	+11.91
Green	Peter Colin Crook	34	6.98	+6.98
Majority		128	26.28	+4.53
Turnout		487	29.05	−37.89
Conservative hold		Swing	+1.49	

=== 2019-2023 ===
Cote Heath By-Election 7 April 2022
Party	Candidate	Votes	%	±%
Conservative	Kev Kirkham	585	55.5	+5.4
Labour	Alan Smith	413	39.2	−10.7
Green	Peter Crook	56	5.3	+5.3
Majority		172	16.3	
Turnout		1,054		
Conservative gain from Labour		Swing		
