= 1987 High Peak Borough Council election =

1987 UK local government election

Elections to High Peak Borough Council in Derbyshire, England were held on 7 May 1987. All of the council was up for election and the council stayed under no overall control.

After the election, the composition of the council was:

- Conservative 17
- Labour 11
- SDP-Liberal Alliance 7
- Independent 9

== Election result ==
High Peak local election result 1987
Party	Seats	Gains	Losses	Net gain/loss	Seats %	Votes %	Votes	+/−
Conservative	17	2	3	-1	38.64			
Labour	11	0	3	-3	25			
Alliance	7	5	0	+5	15.91			
Independent	9	3	4	-1	20.45			

== Ward results ==
All Saints
Party	Candidate	Votes	%	±%
Independent	George Chatterton	1234		
Conservative	Thomas Farnsworth	992		
Labour	Christopher Sydney Turner	989		
Labour	Roger Wilkinson	851		
Labour	Rachel Margaret Smith	825		
Alliance	Frank Hiley	708		
Alliance	Belinda Thompson	673		
Turnout				
Independent hold		Swing		
Conservative gain from Labour		Swing		
Labour hold		Swing		

Barmoor
Party	Candidate	Votes	%	±%
Independent	Brian Millward	286	49.14	
Conservative	Philip Gregory Howard Greaves	226	38.83	
Labour	Margaret Leah	70	12.03	
Majority		60	10.31	
Turnout		582		
Independent gain from Conservative		Swing		

Barms
Party	Candidate	Votes	%	±%
Independent	Alfred Henry Hitchings	885		
Labour	Barbara Mary Langham	612		
Conservative	Michael Kenneth Diamond	467		
Alliance	Joy Mary Fairhurst	352		
Turnout				
Independent hold		Swing		
Labour hold		Swing		

Blackbrook
Party	Candidate	Votes	%	±%
Alliance	Peter John Ashenden	844		
Independent	Peter Coackley	663		
Alliance	Susan Mary Burns	631		
Labour	Andrew Ayres	284		
Labour	David Knights	220		
Turnout				
Alliance gain from Independent		Swing		
Independent gain from Conservative		Swing		

Buxton Central
Party	Candidate	Votes	%	±%
Conservative	Joan Mary Chape	294	41.23	
Alliance	Michael Francis Bryant	258	36.19	
Labour	Michael Pearson-Smith	161	22.58	
Majority		36	5.05	
Turnout		713		
Conservative hold		Swing		

Chapel East
Party	Candidate	Votes	%	±%
Alliance	James Edward George Boote	390	51.52	
Independent	Desmond Francis Bryan	235	31.04	
Labour	Christine Theresa O’Brian	132	17.44	
Majority		155	20.48	
Turnout		757		
Alliance gain from Independent		Swing		

Chapel West
Party	Candidate	Votes	%	±%
Conservative	Ann Stewart Young	890		
Independent	Muriel Bertha Bradbury	874		
Alliance	Susan Peggy Barber	723		
Labour	Harry Berry	294		
Labour	Peter Keith Jones	284		
Turnout				
Conservative hold		Swing		
Independent hold		Swing		

College
Party	Candidate	Votes	%	±%
Conservative	Elizabeth Jane Inglefield	849		
Conservative	Alan Keith Allman	797		
Alliance	Joyce Allwright	672		
Labour	John Morris	245		
Turnout				
Conservative hold		Swing		
Conservative hold		Swing		

Corbar
Party	Candidate	Votes	%	±%
Conservative	Peter De Leighton Brooke	747		
Conservative	Margaret Beatrice Millican	731		
Labour	Valerie Mason	355		
Independent	Kenneth George Howarth	352		
Turnout				
Conservative hold		Swing		
Conservative hold		Swing		

Cote Heath
Party	Candidate	Votes	%	±%
Alliance	Michael Robert Leslie Loader	890		
Alliance	Peter Campbell Newsam	627		
Labour	Ann Mone	581		
Conservative	Elaine Magdalene Arouette Bradbury	557		
Labour	Peter Redfern	450		
Turnout				
Alliance hold		Swing		
Alliance gain from Labour		Swing		

Gamesley
Party	Candidate	Votes	%	±%
Labour	John Francis	969		
Labour	Richard John Cooke	895		
Alliance	Harold Edward Dunkerley	164		
Conservative	Eric Keith Mottram	164		
Turnout				
Labour hold		Swing		
Labour hold		Swing		

Hayfield
Party	Candidate	Votes	%	±%
Conservative	Herbert David Mellor	657	62.63	
Labour	John Anthony Bull	392	37.37	
Majority		265	25.26	
Turnout		1049		
Conservative hold		Swing		

Ladybower
Party	Candidate	Votes	%	±%
Conservative	George Albert Bingham	553	67.85	
Alliance	Ian Roland Wingfield	162	19.88	
Labour	Gillian Taylor	100	12.27	
Majority		391	47.98	
Turnout		815		
Conservative hold		Swing		

Limestone Peak
Party	Candidate	Votes	%	±%
Independent	Evelyn May Tomlinson	588	84.36	
Labour	Sylvia Robinson	109	15.64	
Majority		479	68.72	
Turnout		697		
Independent hold		Swing		

New Mills North
Party	Candidate	Votes	%	±%
Conservative	Dorothy May Brennand	1041		
Alliance	Roy Bickerton	1011		
Conservative	Dorothy Mary Livesley	994		
Labour	Martin Huddleston	943		
Labour	Geoffrey Gordon Griffiths	831		
Labour	Valerie Hill	770		
Alliance	David Arthur Bonsall Woodward	745		
Alliance	David Thomas Gladding	644		
Turnout				
Conservative hold		Swing		
Alliance gain from Labour		Swing		
Conservative hold		Swing		

New Mills South
Party	Candidate	Votes	%	±%
Alliance	Harry Norman Burfoot	761		
Labour	Marion Williams	739		
Labour	Donald Peace Rae	702		
Alliance	Stephen John Herbert Dearden	504		
Conservative	Maureen Agnes Bowen	436		
Conservative	Robert Francis Craddock	373		
Turnout				
Alliance hold		Swing		
Labour hold		Swing		

Peveril
Party	Candidate	Votes	%	±%
Conservative	Charles David Lewis	603	59.58	
Alliance	Angela Helen Kellie	280	27.67	
Labour	Christine Davies	129	12.75	
Majority		323	31.92	
Turnout		1012		
Conservative gain from Independent		Swing		

St. Andrew's
Party	Candidate	Votes	%	±%
Labour	Mary Kathleen Holtom	826		
Labour	John Hallsworth	739		
Conservative	Neville Moss	723		
Alliance	James William Angus	517		
Turnout				
Labour hold		Swing		
Labour hold		Swing		

St. Charles'
Party	Candidate	Votes	%	±%
Labour	David Holtom	944		
Labour	Francis Walter Stubbs	829		
Conservative	Jack Arnold Jones	630		
Alliance	Trevor Jones Randall	431		
Turnout				
Labour hold		Swing		
Labour hold		Swing		

St. James'
Party	Candidate	Votes	%	±%
Conservative	Leslie Ernest Proctor	947		
Conservative	Graham Turner Buckley	912		
Conservative	Barbara Sharpe	888		
Alliance	Malcolm Hay Thompson	744		
Alliance	William John Thatcher	723		
Alliance	Joan Robertson	701		
Labour	Arthur Harrison Gilbert	687		
Labour	Norman Patrick Garlick	679		
Labour	Richard George Stone	626		
Turnout				
Conservative hold		Swing		
Conservative hold		Swing		
Conservative hold		Swing		

St John's
Party	Candidate	Votes	%	±%
Conservative	Brenda Tetlow	760	69.79	
Alliance	Christopher Frank Harbut	183	16.80	
Labour	Peter Roy Urquhart	146	13.41	
Majority		577	52.99	
Turnout		1089		
Conservative hold		Swing		

Simmondley
Party	Candidate	Votes	%	±%
Conservative	Brian Harry Abbott	486	40.27	
Alliance	Gerald Seymour Wood	440	36.45	
Labour	Harry Bunting	281	23.28	
Majority		46	3.81	
Turnout		1207		
Conservative hold		Swing		

Stone Bench
Party	Candidate	Votes	%	±%
Labour	Raymond Vernon Browne	808		
Labour	James Henry Poulton	806		
Alliance	Peter Francis Clayton	323		
Conservative	Linda Diamond	303		
Turnout				
Labour hold		Swing		
Labour hold		Swing		

Tintwistle
Party	Candidate	Votes	%	±%
Independent	Wright Brownhill Cooper	311	39.72	
Labour	Patrick Jenner	239	30.52	
Alliance	John David Leah	233	29.76	
Majority		72	9.20	
Turnout		783		
Independent gain from Conservative		Swing		

Whaley Bridge
Party	Candidate	Votes	%	±%
Independent	Jean Elizabeth Hallam	1808		
Independent	John Arthur Thomas Pritchard	1467		
Alliance	Constance Ann Smith	1145		
Conservative	Graham Fox	1127		
Labour	Damian Francis Allen	610		
Labour	Susan Janet Bottomley	551		
Labour	Michael Brunt	532		
Turnout				
Independent hold		Swing		
Independent hold		Swing		
Alliance gain from Independent		Swing		
