= 2015 High Peak Borough Council election =

Election in the United Kingdom

Map of the results

Elections to High Peak Borough Council in Derbyshire, England were held on 7 May 2015, at the same time as the 2015 UK General Election. All of the council falls up for election every four years and the control of the council changed from no overall control to Conservative councillor control.

== Election result ==
After the election, the composition of the council was:

- Conservative 23
- Labour 17
- Liberal Democrat 2
- Independent 1

High Peak local election result 2015
Party	Seats	Gains	Losses	Net gain/loss	Seats %	Votes %	Votes	+/−
Conservative	23	8	0	+8	53.49	37.86	29,576	
Labour	17	0	4	-4	39.53	35.83	27,990	
Liberal Democrats	2	0	1	-1	4.65	8.01	6,257	
Independent	1	0	3	-3	2.33	5.87	4,583	
Green	0	0	0	0	0.00	8.09	6,317	
UKIP	0	0	0	0	0.00	4.36	3,405	

== Ward results ==
Barms
Party	Candidate	Votes	%	±%
Labour	Rachael Quinn	418	44.95	−11.48
Conservative	Sebastian Brooke	349	37.53	−4.84
Independent	Simon Fussell	155	16.67	+16.67
Majority		69	7.42	−6.65
Turnout		930	63.50	+26.25
Labour hold		Swing		

Blackbrook
Party	Candidate	Votes	%	±%
Conservative	Caroline Howe	1044		
Conservative	John Kappes	864		
Liberal Democrats	Edith Claire Longden	715		
Liberal Democrats	Graham Hewitt	517		
Labour	Ruth George	492		
Labour	Phil George Forrest	466		
Turnout		2454	76.3	+21.19
Conservative hold		Swing		
Conservative gain from Independent		Swing		

Burbage
Party	Candidate	Votes	%	±%
Conservative	Samantha Flower	582	49.45	−15.53
Labour	Jane McGrother	320	27.19	−6.22
Independent	Bob Morris	267	22.68	+22.68
Majority		262	22.26	
Turnout		1177	71.8	+27.16
Conservative hold		Swing		

Buxton Central
Party	Candidate	Votes	%	±%
Labour	Matt Stone	734		
Labour	Jean Todd	723		
Conservative	James Johnson	639		
Conservative	Justine Linden	540		
Green	Susan Ledger	340		
Independent	Bill Fiddy	281		
Independent	Jonathan Davey	261		
Turnout		1984	58.9	+14.87
Labour hold		Swing		
Labour hold		Swing		

Chapel East
Party	Candidate	Votes	%	±%
Conservative	Jim Perkins	658	52.76	+17.76
Labour	Mavis Morrison	350	28.07	−2.76
Liberal Democrats	Brian Hallsworth	125	10.02	−22.96
Green	Tess Lomas	102	8.18	+8.18
Majority		308	24.7	+22.68
Turnout		1247	69.5	+22.65
Conservative hold		Swing		

Chapel West
Party	Candidate	Votes	%	±%
Conservative	Stewart Paul Young	1152		
Conservative	Kathleen Sizeland	1149		
Labour	Jessica Cowley	836		
Labour	Timothy Ian Norton	801		
Green	Lucas Jones	303		
Liberal Democrats	David Rayworth	294		
Turnout		2463	71.36	+23.87
Conservative gain from Labour		Swing		
Conservative hold		Swing		

Corbar
Party	Candidate	Votes	%	±%
Conservative	Clive Johnson	975		
Conservative	Tony Arthur Kemp	848		
Labour	Claire Moore	654		
Labour	Martin Walter Thomas	487		
Independent	Linda June Baldry	362		
Green	Nicky Kierton	205		
Independent	Nick Watterson	251		
Turnout		2234	67.7	+20.49
Conservative hold		Swing		
Conservative hold		Swing		

Cote Heath
Party	Candidate	Votes	%	±%
Conservative	Colin Boynton	965		
Conservative	Linda Grooby	880		
Labour	Lynn Stone	648		
Labour	Keith Edward Savage	642		
Independent	David Finney	263		
Green	Tony Pickering	205		
Turnout		2095	65.2	+26.65
Conservative gain from Labour		Swing		
Conservative gain from Labour		Swing		

Dinting
Party	Candidate	Votes	%	±%
Conservative	Jean Wharmby	720	54.13	−11.3
Labour	Benjamin Hopkins	364	27.37	−6.04
UKIP	Sylvia Hall	128	9.62	+9.62
Green	Stephen Bossett-Roberts	113	8.50	+8.50
Majority		356	26.77	−5.25
Turnout		1330	78.6	+21.66
Conservative hold		Swing		

Gamesley
Party	Candidate	Votes	%	±%
Labour	Anthony Edward McKeown	716	80.87	+23.77
Conservative	Thomas Brian Evans	153	17.46	+17.46
Green	Peter Allen	93	8.50	+8.50
Majority		563	58.04	−5.37
Turnout		970	56	+28.1
Labour hold		Swing		

Hadfield North
Party	Candidate	Votes	%	±%
Labour	Ed Kelly	549	52.09	−6.52
Conservative	Marie Foote	304	28.84	−0.92
UKIP	Richard Moore	189	17.93	+17.93
Majority		245	23.24	−5.6
Turnout		1054	58.7	+23.2
Labour hold		Swing		

Hadfield South
Party	Candidate	Votes	%	±%
Labour	Robert Joseph McKeown	992		
Labour	Peter Edward Siddall	883		
Conservative	Ann Flavell	841		
Conservative	Stephen Dennis William Foote	833		
UKIP	Trish Boyle	337		
UKIP	Pat Ellison-Reed	312		
Green	Melanie O'Brien	254		
Turnout		2344	66.51	+24.93
Labour hold		Swing		
Labour hold		Swing		

Hayfield
Party	Candidate	Votes	%	±%
Conservative	Peter Easter	584	45.84	+45.84
Labour	Dave Gates	338	26.53	+26.53
Liberal Democrats	Martin Jones	187	14.68	−31.07
Green	Karen Hunt	145	11.38	+11.38
Majority		246	19.31	+10.81
Turnout		1274	76	+22.08
Conservative gain from Independent		Swing		

Hope Valley
Party	Candidate	Votes	%	±%
Conservative	Sarah Helliwell	1185		
Conservative	John Walton	1005		
Green	Charlotte Nancy Farrell	755		
Labour	Sandy Lamont	482		
Green	Philip Taylor	473		
UKIP	Andrew Law	329		
Turnout		2463	74.7	+18.84
Conservative hold		Swing		
Conservative hold		Swing		

Howard Town
Party	Candidate	Votes	%	±%
Labour	Godfrey Claff	1217		
Labour	Damien Greenhalgh	1199		
Conservative	Paul Lomas	715		
Green	Robert O'Connor	673		
Turnout		2344	63.9	+23.63
Labour hold		Swing		
Labour hold		Swing		

Limestone Peak
Party	Candidate	Votes	%	±%
Conservative	Daren Robins	575	49.83	−1.61
Labour	Jim Lambert	306	26.52	−4.29
UKIP	Graham Scott	263	22.88	+22.88
Majority		251	21.75	+1.12
Turnout		1154	66.94	+25.16
Conservative hold		Swing		

New Mills East
Party	Candidate	Votes	%	±%
Labour	Alan Barrow	802		
Labour	Ian Samuel Edward Huddlestone	723		
Conservative	Matt Crompton	495		
Liberal Democrats	David Burfoot	346		
Green	Dee Sayce	264		
Turnout		1971	62.27	+25.73
Labour hold		Swing		
Labour hold		Swing		

New Mills West
Party	Candidate	Votes	%	±%
Labour	Lancelot Edgar Dowson	959		
Liberal Democrats	Raymond George Atkins	777		
Conservative	Jeff Lawton	639		
Conservative	Josh Gaskell	602		
Green	Michael Daw	583		
UKIP	Paddy Ban	358		
Liberal Democrats	Alan Debes	291		
Turnout		2509	69.01	+19.84
Labour hold		Swing		
Liberal Democrats hold		Swing		

Old Glossop
Party	Candidate	Votes	%	±%
Conservative	Jamie Douglas	984		
Conservative	Paul Francis Hardy	880		
Labour	Moira Cunningham	767		
Labour	Garry Parvin	767		
Independent	Chris Webster	438		
UKIP	Michael Perry	332		
Green	Margo McKenna	270		
Independent	Neil Johnstone	195		
Turnout		2760	73.3	+34.72
Conservative gain from Labour		Swing		
Conservative gain from Independent		Swing		

Padfield
Party	Candidate	Votes	%	±%
Labour	Nick Longos	649	49.54	+6.68
Conservative	Peter James Kay	635	48.47	+7.55
Majority		14	1.94	
Turnout		1310	69.9	+30.42
Labour hold		Swing		

Sett
Party	Candidate	Votes	%	±%
Conservative	Anthony Ashton	577	47.37	−0.11
Labour	Sue Barrow	423	34.73	+34.73
Green	Michael John Shipley	165	13.55	−20.14
Liberal Democrats	Christopher Weaver	109	8.95	−8.8
Majority		154	12.64	
Turnout		1218	74.9	+24.81
Conservative hold		Swing		

Simmondley
Party	Candidate	Votes	%	±%
Conservative	John Haken	1152		
Conservative	Julie Ann McCabe	866		
Labour	Graham Fox	740		
Labour	Stella Hutchinson	685		
UKIP	David Phillips	420		
Liberal Democrats	Ayshea Christina Garbutt	247		
Liberal Democrats	Murray Booth	238		
Green	Masha Bennett	229		
Turnout		2625	72.67	+28.39
Conservative hold		Swing		
Conservative hold		Swing		

St John's
Party	Candidate	Votes	%	±%
Conservative	George David Wharmby	557	49.47	−9.7
Labour	Rob McKeown	228	20.25	+20.25
Liberal Democrats	Stephen David Worrall	194	17.23	−17.94
UKIP	Chris Boyle	138	12.26	+12.26
Majority		174	15.54	−8.55
Turnout		1126	75.42	+26.79
Conservative hold		Swing		

Stone Bench
Party	Candidate	Votes	%	±%
Labour	David Kerr	1048		
Labour	Fiona Sloman	996		
Conservative	Doreen Martin	611		
Independent	Aileen Warneford	385		
Turnout		1934	58.4	+25.63
Labour hold		Swing		
Labour hold		Swing		

Temple
Party	Candidate	Votes	%	±%
Conservative	Emily Lilian Thrane	760	54.13	−10.24
Labour	Roger Lane Cooper	391	27.85	−5.57
Independent	Jean Luton	131	9.33	+9.33
Green	Catherine Crosby	112	7.98	+7.98
Majority		369	26.28	−4.68
Turnout		1404	77.5	+23.7
Conservative hold		Swing		

Tintwistle
Party	Candidate	Votes	%	±%
Labour	Patrick Jenner	607	55.69	+5.18
Conservative	David Novakovic	308	28.26	−20.45
UKIP	John Reed	160	14.68	+14.68
Majority		14	1.80	
Turnout		1090	64.6	+18.21
Labour hold		Swing		

Whaley Bridge
Party	Candidate	Votes	%	±%
Independent	John Arthur Thomas Pritchard	1594		
Liberal Democrats	David William Lomax	1446		
Conservative	Andrew Fox	1355		
Conservative	Rodney Bruce Gilmour	1271		
Labour	Zara Clarke	1156		
Labour	Martin Thomas	977		
Labour	Andy Murray	906		
Liberal Democrats	Ray Wild	772		
Green	Iain Reynolds	691		
Turnout		3992	74.43	+23.3
Independent hold		Swing		
Liberal Democrats hold		Swing		
Conservative gain from Liberal Democrats		Swing		

Whitfield
Party	Candidate	Votes	%	±%
Labour	Graham Nigel Oakley	549	48.58	−20.7
Conservative	Ian Baker	324	28.67	−7.51
UKIP	Murgan Kerr	152	13.45	+13.45
Green	Chris Cuff	100	8.85	+8.85
Majority		225	19.91	−28.21
Turnout		1130	62.6	+25.4
Labour hold		Swing		
