= 2019 High Peak Borough Council election =

2019 UK local government election

- 2 May 2019

All 43 seats to High Peak Borough Council 22 seats needed for a majority

	First party	Second party
Party	Labour	Conservative
Last election	17 seats, 35.8%	23 seats, 37.9%
Seats won	22	16
Seat change	▲5	▼7
Popular vote	15,940	15,115
Percentage	34.9%	33.2%
Swing	▼0.9%	▼4.7%
	Third party	Fourth party
Party	Liberal Democrats	Green
Last election	2 seats, 8.0%	0 seats, 8.1%
Seats won	3	2
Seat change	▲1	▲2
Popular vote	6,805	6,874
Percentage	14.9%	15.1%
Swing	▲6.9%	▲7.0%
- Map of the results of the election
Council control before election
Conservative
Council control after election
Labour

The 2019 High Peak Borough Council election took place on 2 May 2019 to elect all 43 members of High Peak Borough Council in Derbyshire, England.

The election resulted in the Labour Party taking control of the council from the Conservative Party after winning 22 of the 43 seats up for election. The Conservatives lost 7 of the seats they were defending and lost their majority on the council. The Liberal Democrats and Greens won 3 and 2 seats respectively.

== Summary ==
After the election, the composition of the council was:

- Labour 22
- Conservative 16
- Liberal Democrat 3
- Green 2

=== Election result ===
2019 High Peak Borough Council election
Party	Candidates	Seats	Gains	Losses	Net gain/loss	Seats %	Votes %	Votes	+/−
Labour	37	22	5	0	▲5	51.2	34.9	15,940	–0.9
Conservative	43	16	0	7	▼7	37.2	33.2	15,115	–4.7
Liberal Democrats	22	3	1	0	▲1	7.0	14.9	6,805	+6.9
Green	26	2	2	0	▲2	4.7	15.1	6,874	+7.0
UKIP	4	0	0	0	Steady	0.0	1.1	505	–3.3
Independent	1	0	0	0	▼1	0.0	0.8	368	–5.1

== Ward results ==
Barms
Party	Candidate	Votes	%	±%
Labour	Rachael Quinn	223	48.9	3.9
Conservative	Sebastian Brooke	155	34.0	−3.5
Green	Daniel Mayers	78	17.1	17.1
Majority		68	14.9	7.7
Registered electors		1,401		
Turnout		462	32.98	−30.52
Labour hold		Swing		

Blackbrook (2 seats)
Party	Candidate	Votes	%	±%
Liberal Democrats	Edith Claire Longden	607	37.5	
Conservative	Eve Burton	571	35.2	
Conservative	John Kappes	519	32.0	
Labour	Penny Took	484	29.9	
Liberal Democrats	Graham Hewitt	443	27.3	
Green	Joshua Bennett	342	21.1	
Majority		52	3.2	
Registered electors		3,507		
Turnout		1620	46.19	−30.11
Liberal Democrats gain from Conservative		Swing		
Conservative hold		Swing		

Burbage
Party	Candidate	Votes	%	±%
Conservative	Samantha Flower	232	43.2	−6.3
Labour	Anthony Glew	175	32.6	5.4
Green	Ivor Lewis	130	24.2	24.2
Majority		57	10.6	−12.1
Registered electors		1,593		
Turnout		548	34.4	−37.4
Conservative hold		Swing		

Buxton Central (2 seats)
Party	Candidate	Votes	%	±%
Labour	Matt Stone	651	59.1	
Labour	Jean Todd	586	53.2	
Green	Eileen Reynolds	302	27.4	
Conservative	Alicia Hill	275	25.0	
Conservative	Josh Kirkman	235	21.3	
Majority		284	25.8	
Registered electors		2,942		
Turnout		1101	37.42	
Labour hold		Swing		
Labour hold		Swing		

Chapel East
Party	Candidate	Votes	%	±%
Conservative	Jim Perkins	253	43.2	
Labour	Jim Lambert	195	33.3	
Green	Jeremy Wight	72	12.3	
Liberal Democrats	James Patterson	65	11.1	
Majority		58	9.9	
Registered electors		1,705		
Turnout		600	35.19	
Conservative hold		Swing		

Chapel West (2 seats)
Party	Candidate	Votes	%	±%
Conservative	Kathleen Sizeland	656	43.7	
Conservative	Stewart Paul Young	522	34.8	
Labour	Jessica Cowley	391	26.0	
Independent	Paddy Bann	368	24.5	
Labour	Adrian Cowley	342	22.8	
Liberal Democrats	David Rayworth	208	13.9	
Green	Philip Taylor	201	13.4	
Majority		131	8.7	
Registered electors		3,887		
Turnout		1501	38.62	
Conservative hold		Swing		
Conservative hold		Swing		

Corbar (2 seats)
Party	Candidate	Votes	%	±%
Conservative	Tony Arthur Kemp	445	35.4	
Labour	Madeline Hall	435	34.6	
Green	Peter Crook	420	33.4	
Conservative	Pam Reddy	388	30.8	
Liberal Democrats	Adam Scott	306	24.3	
Liberal Democrats	Stan Heptinstall	266	21.1	
Majority		15	1.2	
Registered electors		3,204		
Turnout		1258	39.26	
Conservative hold		Swing		
Labour gain from Conservative		Swing		

Cote Heath (2 seats)
Party	Candidate	Votes	%	±%
Conservative	Linda Grooby	477	47.8	
Labour	Keith Edward Savage	475	47.6	
Labour	Catharine Grundy-Glew	452	45.3	
Conservative	Laszlo Gyongyosi	407	40.8	
Majority		23	2.3	
Registered electors		3,159		
Turnout		998	31.72	
Conservative hold		Swing		
Labour gain from Conservative		Swing		

Dinting
Party	Candidate	Votes	%	±%
Conservative	Jean Wharmby	361	43.3	
Labour	Ray Collins	262	31.5	
Green	Holly McBride	120	14.4	
Liberal Democrats	Stephen Worrall	90	10.8	
Majority		99	11.9	
Registered electors		1,797		
Turnout		844	46.97	
Conservative hold		Swing		

Gamesley
Party	Candidate	Votes	%	±%
Labour	Anthony Edward McKeown	306	84.8	
Conservative	Matthew Crompton	55	15.2	
Majority		251	69.5	
Registered electors		1,733		
Turnout		381	21.98	
Labour hold		Swing		

Hadfield North
Party	Candidate	Votes	%	±%
Labour	Ed Kelly	242	55.7	
Green	Robyn Summers	110	25.3	
Conservative	Lisa Hartington	82	18.9	
Majority		132	30.4	
Registered electors		1,727		
Turnout		445	25.77	
Labour hold		Swing		

Hadfield South (2 seats)
Party	Candidate	Votes	%	±%
Labour	Edward Siddall	543	49.5	
Labour	Bob McKeown	506	46.1	
Conservative	Peter Lynas	250	22.8	
Conservative	Bev Haigh	237	21.6	
Green	Peter Tomlin	212	19.3	
UKIP	Jo Shaw	137	12.5	
Liberal Democrats	Keith Parry	133	12.1	
Majority		256	23.3	
Registered electors		3,346		
Turnout		1097	32.78	
Labour hold		Swing		
Labour hold		Swing		

Hayfield
Party	Candidate	Votes	%	±%
Conservative	Eva Lawson	300	37.6	
Labour	Catherine Hughes	287	36.0	
Liberal Democrats	David Burfoot	124	15.5	
Green	Susan Shipley	87	10.9	
Majority		13	1.6	
Registered electors		1,666		
Turnout		808	48.5	
Conservative hold		Swing		

Hope Valley (2 seats)
Party	Candidate	Votes	%	±%
Green	Charlotte Nancy Farrell	777	45.9	
Green	Joanna Collins	744	44.0	
Conservative	Fredrick John Walton	728	43.0	
Conservative	Charles Lawley	708	41.8	
Liberal Democrats	Jane Simm	226	13.4	
Majority		16	0.9	
Registered electors		3,138		
Turnout		1692	53.92	
Green gain from Conservative		Swing		
Green gain from Conservative		Swing		

Howard Town (2 seats)
Party	Candidate	Votes	%	±%
Labour	Damien Greenhalgh	761	59.8	
Labour	Rachel Abbotts	688	54.0	
Green	Robert Hodgetts-Haley	355	27.9	
Conservative	Peter Kay	191	15.0	
Liberal Democrats	Mark Smitham	170	13.4	
Conservative	Dominic Starkey	144	11.3	
Majority		333	26.2	
Registered electors		3,528		
Turnout		1273	36.08	
Labour hold		Swing		
Labour hold		Swing		

Limestone Peak
Party	Candidate	Votes	%	±%
Conservative	Peter Roberts	320	57.1	
Labour	Caitlin Bisknell	147	26.3	
Green	Daniel Wimberley	93	16.6	
Majority		173	30.9	
Registered electors		1,692		
Turnout		570	33.69	
Conservative hold		Swing		

New Mills East (2 seats)
Party	Candidate	Votes	%	±%
Labour	Ian Samuel Edward Huddlestone	421	43.9	
Labour	Alan Barrow	411	42.9	
Liberal Democrats	Beth Atkins	350	36.5	
Conservative	Pam Ashton	186	19.4	
Green	Dee Sayce	185	19.3	
UKIP	Jim Muldoon	131	13.7	
Conservative	Virginia Priestley	78	8.1	
Majority		61	6.4	
Registered electors		3,091		
Turnout		958	30.99	
Labour hold		Swing		
Labour hold		Swing		

New Mills West (2 seats)
Party	Candidate	Votes	%	±%
Labour	Lancelot Edgar Dowson	623	42.8	
Liberal Democrats	Raymond George Atkins	552	37.9	
Labour	Anne Marie Clarke	527	36.2	
Liberal Democrats	Chris Weaver	320	22.0	
Green	Hazel Body	318	21.8	
Conservative	Edward Sheils	280	19.2	
Conservative	William Lockwood	158	10.9	
Majority		25	1.7	
Registered electors		3,426		
Turnout		1456	42.5	
Labour hold		Swing		
Liberal Democrats hold		Swing		

Old Glossop (2 seats)
Party	Candidate	Votes	%	±%
Conservative	Jamie Douglas	591	35.6	
Conservative	Paul Francis Hardy	584	35.2	
Labour	Sheila Yamin	549	33.1	
Labour	Pat Irwin	500	30.1	
Green	Paul Bohan	455	27.4	
Liberal Democrats	Kallen McColl	360	21.7	
Majority		35	2.1	
Registered electors		3,724		
Turnout		1659	44.55	
Conservative hold		Swing		
Conservative hold		Swing		

Padfield
Party	Candidate	Votes	%	±%
Labour	Ollie Cross	337	46.3	
Conservative	David Hartington	249	34.2	
Green	Rachel Robinson	142	19.5	
Majority		88	12.1	
Registered electors		1,851		
Turnout		728	39.9	
Labour hold		Swing		

Sett
Party	Candidate	Votes	%	±%
Conservative	Tony Ashton	316	42.9	
Labour	Aaron Jones	274	37.2	
Green	Michael John Shipley	146	19.8	
Majority		42	5.7	
Registered electors		1,620		
Turnout		743	45.86	
Conservative hold		Swing		

Simmondley (2 seats)
Party	Candidate	Votes	%	±%
Labour	Stewart Gardner	625	41.8	
Conservative	John Haken	580	38.8	
Conservative	Julie Ann McCabe	516	34.5	
Green	Melanie O’Brien	319	21.4	
Liberal Democrats	Ayshea Christina Garbutt	211	14.1	
UKIP	David Phillips	164	11.0	
Liberal Democrats	Alastair Murray Booth	117	7.8	
Majority		64	4.3	
Registered electors		3,415		
Turnout		1494	43.75	
Labour gain from Conservative		Swing		
Conservative hold		Swing		

St John's
Party	Candidate	Votes	%	±%
Conservative	George David Wharmby	283	52.8	
Labour	Kasey Carver	180	33.6	
UKIP	Chris Boyle	73	13.6	
Majority		103	19.2	
Registered electors		1,530		
Turnout		549	35.88	
Conservative hold		Swing		

Stone Bench (2 seats)
Party	Candidate	Votes	%	±%
Labour	David Kerr	438	53.5	
Labour	Fiona Sloman	408	49.9	
Conservative	Elizabeth Hill	210	25.7	
Conservative	David McDowell	187	22.9	
Green	Guy Rees	153	18.7	
Liberal Democrats	Lynton Bennett	111	13.6	
Majority		198	24.2	
Registered electors		3,198		
Turnout		818	25.58	
Labour hold		Swing		
Labour hold		Swing		

Temple
Party	Candidate	Votes	%	±%
Conservative	Emily Lilian Thrane	364	44.0	
Labour	Tony Riddington	261	31.6	
Green	Ben Evens	202	24.4	
Majority		103	12.5	
Registered electors		1,800		
Turnout		827	46.8	
Conservative hold		Swing		

Tintwistle
Party	Candidate	Votes	%	±%
Labour	Rob Baker	336	50.7	
Conservative	Jill Crossland	223	33.6	
Green	Luke Robinson	104	15.7	
Majority		113	17.0	
Registered electors		1,613		
Turnout		663	41.7	
Labour hold		Swing		

Whaley Bridge (3 seats)
Party	Candidate	Votes	%	±%
Liberal Democrats	David William Lomax	901	40.4	
Labour	Kath Thomson	790	35.4	
Labour	Shannon-Kate Thomson	744	33.3	
Green	Lucas Jones	726	32.5	
Conservative	Alison Fox	686	30.7	
Conservative	Andrew Fox	613	27.5	
Liberal Democrats	Andy Thomson	613	27.5	
Liberal Democrats	Margaret Weaver	570	25.5	
Conservative	Lesley Morgan	448	20.1	
Majority		18	0.8	
Registered electors		5,174		
Turnout		2231	43.12	
Liberal Democrats hold		Swing		
Labour gain from Independent		Swing		
Labour gain from Conservative		Swing		

Whitfield
Party	Candidate	Votes	%	±%
Labour	Graham Nigel Oakley	365	60.8	
Conservative	Anne Ross Worrall	92	15.3	
Green	Patricia Thompson	81	13.5	
Liberal Democrats	Keith Braithwaite	62	10.3	
Majority		273	45.5	
Registered electors		1,717		
Turnout		609	35.47	
Labour hold		Swing		

== Changes 2019–2023 ==
- The by-election in Cote Heath ward on 7 April 2022 was won by the Conservatives, costing Labour its overall majority on the council.
- Samantha Flower (Conservative, Burbage) resigned from the party in March 2022 to sit as an independent, in protest at the government's handling of the visa system for refugees fleeing the invasion of Ukraine, which she described as "hostile" and "xenophobic".
- Kath Thomson and Shannon Thomson, a mother and daughter who had been elected for Whaley Bridge in 2019, resigned from both the council and the Labour Party in September 2022, saying in a joint statement that the party's values had been abandoned since its change of leadership and that alleged racist and sexist behaviour by senior party staff had left them feeling "betrayed and humiliated". No by-election was held for either seat, and both remained vacant until the 2023 election.
- Immediately before the 2023 election the council comprised 19 Labour councillors, 16 Conservatives, three Liberal Democrats, two Greens and one independent, with two vacant seats.

=== By-elections ===
==== Cote Heath ====
The by-election was called following the sudden death in early December 2021 of Labour councillor Keith Savage, who had been elected for the ward in 2019 and had first represented it from 1995.

Cote Heath: 7 April 2022
Party	Candidate	Votes	%	±%
Conservative	Frank Kirkham	585	55.5	+5.4
Labour	Alan Smith	413	39.2	−10.7
Green	Peter Crook	56	5.3	N/A
Majority		172	16.3	
Registered electors		3,243		
Turnout		1,056	32.56	
Rejected ballots		2	0.2	
Conservative gain from Labour		Swing	▲8.1	
