= 2003 High Peak Borough Council election =

2003 UK local government election

Results of the 2003 High Peak Borough Council election

Elections to High Peak Borough Council in Derbyshire, England were held on 1 May 2003. All of the council was up for election and the control of the council changed from Labour control to no overall control. Boundary changes since the 1999 local elections reduced the number of seats by 1, and meant that all wards had changed boundaries, with the exception of Whaley Bridge ward.

After the election, the composition of the council was:

- Labour 18
- Conservative 12
- Liberal Democrat 7
- Independent 4
- Glossop Independent Party 2

== Election result ==
High Peak local election result 2003
Party	Seats	Gains	Losses	Net gain/loss	Seats %	Votes %	Votes	+/−
Labour	18				41.9			
Conservative	12				27.9			
Liberal Democrats	7				16.3			
Independent	4				9.3			
Glossop Independent Party	2				4.6			
Socialist Alliance	0	0	0	0	0		341	

== Ward results ==
Barms
Party	Candidate	Votes	%	±%
Independent	Darran Hawkins	354	69.0	
Labour	John Gordon Wilson	157	30.6	
Majority		197	38.4	
Turnout		513	33.51	
Independent win (new seat)				

Blackbrook
Party	Candidate	Votes	%	±%
Conservative	Christopher Pearson	739		
Liberal Democrats	Brian Colin Hallsworth	557		
Labour	Jennifer Mary Flanagan	521		
Conservative	Anthony Ashton	434		
Labour	Suzanne Elizabeth Richards	143		
Turnout		1344	43.65	
Conservative win (new seat)				
Liberal Democrats win (new seat)				

Burbage
Party	Candidate	Votes	%	±%
Conservative	John Ronald Silverwood Faulkner	324	56.8	
Liberal Democrats	Brian Richard Shepherd	171		
Labour	Peter Ian Maria Crespin	75	13.1	
Majority		153	26.84	
Turnout		570	37.85	
Conservative win (new seat)				

Buxton Central
Party	Candidate	Votes	%	±%
Labour	Jane Anne McGrother	398		
Labour	Nicola Martin	362		
Conservative	Brent Anthony Edward Salt	334		
Conservative	Harry Bibby	314		
Liberal Democrats	Marc Godwin	289		
Liberal Democrats	Mark Robert Webb	246		
Turnout		1072	35.51	
Labour win (new seat)				
Labour win (new seat)				

Chapel East
Party	Candidate	Votes	%	±%
Liberal Democrats	Michael Harrison	270	43.48	
Labour	Norman Prime	212	34.13	
Conservative	Norma Mary Varnouse	136	21.9	
Majority		58	9.34	
Turnout		621	36.57	
Liberal Democrats win (new seat)				

Chapel West
Party	Candidate	Votes	%	±%
Conservative	Andrew Russell Bingham	567		
Labour	Timothy Ian Norton	456		
Conservative	Stewart Paul Young	452		
Liberal Democrats	Peter John Ashenden	416		
Turnout		1176	35.69	
Conservative win (new seat)				
Labour win (new seat)				

Corbar
Party	Candidate	Votes	%	±%
Conservative	Clive John Beattie	454		
Conservative	William Alan Wells	443		
Liberal Democrats	Mathew Alexander Bain	312		
Labour	Colin Richard Brett	252		
Turnout		945	33.32	
Conservative win (new seat)				
Conservative win (new seat)				

Cote Heath
Party	Candidate	Votes	%	±%
Labour	Ann Mone	418		
Labour	Ian King Hamilton	386		
Conservative	Alexandra Louise Alice Hopkins	342		
Conservative	Alan Birch	326		
Turnout		1478	49.85	
Labour win (new seat)				
Labour win (new seat)				

Dinting
Party	Candidate	Votes	%	±%
Conservative	Katherine Jane Hopkins	352	50.35	
Labour	Barbara Anne Hastings-Asatourian	175	25.0	
Liberal Democrats	Goinden (George) Kuppan	115	16.5	
Majority		177	25.32	
Turnout		699	47.45	
Conservative win (new seat)				

Gamesley
Party	Candidate	Votes	%	±%
Labour	Anthony Edward McKeown	unopposed	N/A	
Labour win (new seat)				

Hadfield North
Party	Candidate	Votes	%	±%
Labour	Victoria Elizabeth Mann	unopposed	N/A	
Labour win (new seat)				

Hadfield South
Party	Candidate	Votes	%	±%
Labour	Robert Joseph McKeown	489		
Labour	Ian David Rose	482		
Conservative	Marie Melita Foote	352		
Conservative	Stephen Dennis William Foote	345		
Turnout		913	27.14	
Labour win (new seat)				
Labour win (new seat)				

Hayfield
Party	Candidate	Votes	%	±%
Independent	Herbert David Mellor	468	64.73	
Labour	Jane Ayres	247	34.16	
Majority		221	30.57	
Turnout		723	44.96	
Independent win (new seat)				

Hope Valley
Party	Candidate	Votes	%	±%
Conservative	Ronald Ernest Priestley	749		
Conservative	Frederick John Walton	579		
Liberal Democrats	John David Johnson	432		
Labour	Felicity Barbara Skelton	369		
Turnout		1351	42.71	
Conservative win (new seat)				
Conservative win (new seat)				

Howard Town
Party	Candidate	Votes	%	±%
Labour	Jacqueline Margaret Wilkinson	400		
Labour	Robert Adderley	399		
Glossop Independent Party	Amanda Jane Whitehead	383		
Conservative	Jean Wharmby	258		
Socialist Alliance	Mary Ann Littlefield	132		
Turnout				
Labour win (new seat)				
Labour win (new seat)				

Limestone Peak
Party	Candidate	Votes	%	±%
Conservative	Derek Walter Udale	310	55.4	
Liberal Democrats	Gillian Harris	245	43.8	
Majority		65	11.61	
Turnout		560	32.61	
Conservative win (new seat)				

New Mills East
Party	Candidate	Votes	%	±%
Labour	Marion Williams	359		
Labour	Ian Samuel Edward Huddlestone	337		
Liberal Democrats	Stephen Herbert John Dearden	230		
Liberal Democrats	Trevor Edward Stephen Jefcoate	191		
Conservative	Christopher John Saunders	179		
Conservative	Gemma Kate McDowell	156		
Socialist Alliance	Dominic Richard McGlynn	48		
Turnout		806	26.95	
Labour win (new seat)				
Labour win (new seat)				

New Mills West
Party	Candidate	Votes	%	±%
Liberal Democrats	Raymond George Atkins	592		
Liberal Democrats	Ian Fletcher	576		
Labour	Alan Barrow	312		
Labour	Lancelot Edgar Dowson	305		
Conservative	Andrew Bowers	290		
Conservative	David Charles McDowell	176		
Socialist Alliance	Paul Anthony Brook	118		
Turnout		1263	39.39	
Liberal Democrats win (new seat)				
Liberal Democrats win (new seat)				

Old Glossop
Party	Candidate	Votes	%	±%
Independent	Ivan Bell	530		
Glossop Independent Party	Christopher John Webster	460		
Glossop Independent Party	Neil Johnstone	362		
Labour	Graham Nigel Oakley	345		
Conservative	George David Wharmby	303		
Labour	Roger Wilkinson	285		
Conservative	Nicola Mary Goodall	172		
Turnout		1372	42.82	
Independent win (new seat)				
Independent win (new seat)				

Padfield
Party	Candidate	Votes	%	±%
Labour	David John Wilcox	221	43.4	
Glossop Independent Party	Linda Evelyn Beale	158	31.0	
Conservative	Thomas Brian Evans	121	23.8	
Majority		63	12.38	
Turnout		509	26.39	
Labour win (new seat)				

Sett
Party	Candidate	Votes	%	±%
Conservative	Christopher Barnes	360	54.2	
Labour	John Anthony Bull	193	29.1	
Independent	Eva Hodgson	103	15.5	
Majority		167	25.15	
Turnout		664	40.74	
Conservative win (new seat)				

Simmondley
Party	Candidate	Votes	%	±%
Liberal Democrats	Peter Roy Urquhart	564		
Labour	John Michael Hyde	446		
Conservative	Andrew Richardson	373		
Conservative	Teresa Margaret Moore	205		
Turnout		1061	30.70	
Liberal Democrats win (new seat)				
Labour win (new seat)				

St John's
Party	Candidate	Votes	%	±%
Conservative	Anne Ross Worrall	432	76.5	
Labour	Alan Smart	133	23.5	
Majority		299	52.92	
Turnout		565	37.84	
Conservative win (new seat)				

Stone Bench
Party	Candidate	Votes	%	±%
Labour	Caitlin Janette Bisknell	451		
Labour	Barbara June Wilson	414		
Conservative	Rosemary Byatte	288		
Conservative	George Hopkins	259		
Turnout		763	24.28	
Labour win (new seat)				
Labour win (new seat)				

Temple
Party	Candidate	Votes	%	±%
Conservative	Glynis Moira Kirk	472	68.80	
Labour	Jonathan Martin Michaelis	202	29.4	
Majority		270	39.36	
Turnout		686	43.83	
Conservative win (new seat)				

Tintwistle
Party	Candidate	Votes	%	±%
Labour	Joyce Brocklehurst	265	46.1	
Independent	Charles Eric Steele	159	27.6	
Conservative	Neville Moss	148	25.7	
Majority		106	18.43	
Turnout		575	34.43	
Labour win (new seat)				

Whaley Bridge
Party	Candidate	Votes	%	±%
Liberal Democrats	David William Lomax	1272		
Independent	John Arthur Thomas Pritchard	1185		
Liberal Democrats	Linda Leather	1109		
Labour	Henry Leigh Playford	636		
Conservative	Donald Gregory	345		
Conservative	David Harvey Lincoln Parry-Richards	299		
Turnout		1983	40.31	
Liberal Democrats hold		Swing		
Independent hold		Swing		
Liberal Democrats hold		Swing		

Whitfield
Party	Candidate	Votes	%	±%
Glossop Independent Party	Leslie Colin Wilcox	278	51.1	
Labour	Peter William Gerald Collard	220	40.4	
Socialist Alliance	Jacqueline Burford	43	7.9	
Majority		58	10.66	
Turnout		544	33.83	
Independent win (new seat)				
