= 2011 High Peak Borough Council election =

2011 UK local government election

Results of the 2011 High Peak Borough Council election

Elections to High Peak Borough Council in Derbyshire, England were held on 5 May 2011. All of the council was up for election and the control of the council changed from Conservative control to no overall control. Overall turnout was 44.11%.

After the election, the composition of the council was:

- Labour 21
- Conservative 15
- Liberal Democrat 3
- Independent 4

== Election result ==
High Peak local election result 2011
Party	Seats	Gains	Losses	Net gain/loss	Seats %	Votes %	Votes	+/−
Labour	21	12	0	+12	48.84			
Conservative	15	1	10	-9	34.88			
Liberal Democrats	3	0	3	-3	6.98			
Independent	4	1	1	0	9.30			
Green	0	0	0	0	0			
UKIP	0	0	0	0	0			

== Ward results ==
Barms
Party	Candidate	Votes	%	±%
Labour	Rachael Quinn	329	56.43	+14.53
Conservative	Bill Barratt	247	42.37	−0.33
Majority		82	14.07	
Turnout		583	37.25	+2.66
Labour gain from Conservative		Swing		

Blackbrook
Party	Candidate	Votes	%	±%
Conservative	Audrey Bramah	706		
Independent	Christopher Pearson	665		
Liberal Democrats	Edith Claire Longden	644		
Conservative	Theodore Rofer	410		
Liberal Democrats	Lisa Kate Beeden	382		
Labour	Phil George Forrest	294		
Turnout		1757	55.11	+7.49
Conservative hold		Swing		
Independent gain from Conservative		Swing		

Burbage
Party	Candidate	Votes	%	±%
Conservative	John Ronald Silverwood Faulkner	566	64.98	−12.42
Labour	Ian King Hamilton	291	33.41	+12.01
Majority		275	31.57	
Turnout		871	44.64	+5.82
Conservative hold		Swing		

Buxton Central
Party	Candidate	Votes	%	±%
Labour	Philip Ashmore	566		
Labour	Christopher James Payne	466		
Conservative	William Fiddy	455		
Conservative	Robert Morris	452		
Green	Matthew Alexander Bain	190		
Liberal Democrats	Peter Ashenden	150		
Turnout		1255	36.18	−3.58
Labour gain from Conservative		Swing		
Labour gain from Conservative		Swing		

Chapel East
Party	Candidate	Votes	%	±%
Conservative	Jim Perkins	294	35.00	−5.50
Liberal Democrats	Mike Harrison	277	32.98	−9.72
Labour	Mavis Morrison	259	30.83	+14.13
Majority		17	2.02	
Turnout		840	46.85	9.72
Conservative gain from Liberal Democrats		Swing		

Chapel West
Party	Candidate	Votes	%	±%
Labour	Timothy Ian Norton	721		
Conservative	Stewart Paul Young	718		
Conservative	Jocelyn Street	697		
Liberal Democrats	Alan Debes	315		
Turnout		1586	47.49	+5.17
Labour gain from Conservative		Swing		
Conservative hold		Swing		

Corbar
Party	Candidate	Votes	%	±%
Conservative	Linda June Baldry	748		
Conservative	Tony Arthur Kemp	743		
Labour	Martin Walter Thomas	535		
Liberal Democrats	Christopher Richard Warhurst Weaver	336		
Turnout		1428	47.21	+4.62
Conservative hold		Swing		
Conservative hold		Swing		

Cote Heath
Party	Candidate	Votes	%	±%
Labour	Lynn Stone	556		
Labour	Keith Edward Savage	525		
Conservative	Colin Boynton	521		
Conservative	Linda Grooby	506		
Turnout		1158	38.55	+3.37
Labour gain from Conservative		Swing		
Labour gain from Conservative		Swing		

Dinting
Party	Candidate	Votes	%	±%
Conservative	Jean Wharmby	564	65.43	+6.93
Labour	Ben Hopkins	288	33.41	+17.41
Majority		276	32.02	
Turnout		862	56.94	+4.75
Conservative hold		Swing		

Gamesley
Party	Candidate	Votes	%	±%
Labour	Anthony Edward McKeown	389	80.87	+23.77
Conservative	Thomas Brian Evans	84	17.46	+17.46
Majority		305	63.41	
Turnout		481	27.90	+2.43
Labour hold		Swing		

Hadfield North
Party	Candidate	Votes	%	±%
Labour	Victoria Elizabeth Mann	317	58.60	+7.90
Conservative	David Novakovic	161	29.76	−3.64
Liberal Democrats	John Storey	62	11.46	−1.74
Majority		156	28.84	
Turnout		541	35.50	+3.56
Labour hold		Swing		

Hadfield South
Party	Candidate	Votes	%	±%
Labour	Robert Joseph McKeown	761		
Labour	Peter Edward Siddall	725		
Conservative	Marie Melita Foote	599		
Conservative	Stephen Dennis William Foote	568		
Turnout		1432	41.58	+7.75
Labour hold		Swing		
Labour gain from Conservative		Swing		

Hayfield
Party	Candidate	Votes	%	±%
Independent	Herbert David Mellor	485	54.25	+54.25
Liberal Democrats	Elizabeth Atkins	409	45.75	+45.75
Majority		76	8.50	
Turnout		894	53.92	+53.92
Independent hold		Swing		

Hope Valley
Party	Candidate	Votes	%	±%
Conservative	Tony Favell	991		
Conservative	John Walton	799		
Green	Charlotte Nancy Farrell	634		
Liberal Democrats	Maeve Patricia Serby	519		
Turnout		1797	55.86	10.35
Conservative hold		Swing		
Conservative hold		Swing		

Howard Town
Party	Candidate	Votes	%	±%
Labour	Godfrey Claff	753		
Labour	Colin Peter Waude	643		
Conservative	Jamie Douglas	370		
Conservative	William Rowlands	326		
Green	Peter Duncan Allen	248		
Turnout		1318	40.27	6.32
Labour hold		Swing		
Labour hold		Swing		

Limestone Peak
Party	Candidate	Votes	%	±%
Conservative	Derek Walter Udale	374	51.44	−5.86
Labour	Alexander Lamont	224	30.81	+30.81
Liberal Democrats	Graham Scott	121	16.64	−24.76
Majority		150	20.63	
Turnout		727	41.78	+4.07
Conservative hold		Swing		

New Mills East
Party	Candidate	Votes	%	±%
Labour	Ian Samuel Edward Huddlestone	565		
Labour	Alan Barrow	510		
Conservative	Mark Gadd	370		
Conservative	Gwyn Bowers	333		
Liberal Democrats	Alistair John Stevens	239		
Liberal Democrats	Tobias Spencer Stroner	150		
Turnout		1151	36.54	−0.96
Labour gain from Liberal Democrats		Swing		
Labour hold		Swing		

New Mills West
Party	Candidate	Votes	%	±%
Labour	Lancelot Edgar Dowson	648		
Liberal Democrats	Raymond George Atkins	573		
Conservative	Jacqueline Gadd	494		
Liberal Democrats	Janet Carter	476		
Green	Hazel May Body	456		
Conservative	David Ian Lamb	402		
Turnout		1685	49.17	+5.73
Labour gain from Liberal Democrats		Swing		
Liberal Democrats hold		Swing		

Old Glossop
Party	Candidate	Votes	%	±%
Labour	Garry Parvin	687		
Independent	Chris Webster	686		
Conservative	Paul Francis Hardy	673		
Labour	Damien Greenhalgh	653		
Conservative	Jeff Lawton	421		
Turnout		1436	38.58	−0.55
Labour gain from Independent		Swing		
Independent hold		Swing		

Padfield
Party	Candidate	Votes	%	±%
Labour	Eleanor Wilcox	354	42.86	+12.72
Conservative	Peter James Kay	338	40.92	+6.06
Green	Lee David Selwood	88	10.65	+10.65
Liberal Democrats	Sandra Batey	39	4.72	−30.00
Majority		16	1.94	
Turnout		826	39.48	3.73
Labour gain from Conservative		Swing		

Sett
Party	Candidate	Votes	%	±%
Conservative	Anthony Ashton	396	47.48	+8.40
Green	Michael John Shipley	281	33.69	+33.69
Liberal Democrats	Raymond Wild	148	17.75	−17.41
Majority		115	13.79	
Turnout		834	50.09	3.04
Conservative hold		Swing		

Simmondley
Party	Candidate	Votes	%	±%
Conservative	John Haken	793		
Conservative	Julie Ann McCabe	663		
Labour	Robert O’Connor	588		
Labour	Nick Longos	574		
Liberal Democrats	Jonathan Walker Haggart	268		
Liberal Democrats	Ayshea Christina Garbutt	229		
Turnout		1660	44.28	5.11
Conservative hold		Swing		
Conservative hold		Swing		

St John's
Party	Candidate	Votes	%	±%
Conservative	George David Wharmby	429	59.17	−11.36
Liberal Democrats	Stephen David Worrall	255	35.17	+22.01
Majority		174	24.00	
Turnout		725	48.63	+3.00
Conservative hold		Swing		

Stone Bench
Party	Candidate	Votes	%	±%
Labour	Caitlin Janette Bisknell	673		
Labour	Fiona Sloman	616		
Conservative	Pam Reddy	356		
Conservative	Mick Reddy	341		
Turnout		1085	32.77	+5.14
Labour hold		Swing		
Labour hold		Swing		

Temple
Party	Candidate	Votes	%	±%
Conservative	Emily Lilian Thrane	524	64.37	−11.15
Labour	Roger Lane Cooper	272	33.42	+10.60
Majority		252	30.96	
Turnout		814	53.80	+6.08
Conservative hold		Swing		

Tintwistle
Party	Candidate	Votes	%	±%
Labour	Patrick Jenner	393	50.51	+5.93
Conservative	William Clarke	379	48.71	−5.52
Majority		14	1.80	
Turnout		778	46.39	+10.93
Labour gain from Conservative		Swing		

Whaley Bridge
Party	Candidate	Votes	%	±%
Independent	John Arthur Thomas Pritchard	1286		
Liberal Democrats	David William Lomax	1117		
Liberal Democrats	Linda Leather	1038		
Labour	Neville Clarke	807		
Conservative	Rodney Bruce Gilmour	799		
Conservative	Samantha Claire Flower	502		
Conservative	David Charles McDowell	423		
UKIP	James Henry Bush	371		
Turnout		2638	51.13	+8.68
Independent hold		Swing		
Liberal Democrats hold		Swing		
Liberal Democrats hold		Swing		

Whitfield
Party	Candidate	Votes	%	±%
Labour	Graham Nigel Oakley	442	69.28	+16.71
Conservative	Paul Lomas	135	21.16	−2.73
Liberal Democrats	Goinden (George) Kuppan	55	8.62	−14.74
Majority		307	48.12	
Turnout		638	37.20	+2.58
Labour hold		Swing		
