= 1979 High Peak Borough Council election =

1979 UK local government election

Elections to High Peak Borough Council in Derbyshire, England, the United Kingdom were held on 7 May 1979. All of the council was up for election and control of the council changed from Conservative control to no overall control.

Boundary changes since the 1976 local elections reduced the number of seats by 2.

After the election, the composition of the council was:

- Conservative 22
- Labour 12
- Liberal 2
- Independent 8

== Election result ==
High Peak local election result 1979
Party	Seats	Gains	Losses	Net gain/loss	Seats %	Votes %	Votes	+/−
Conservative	22	0	5	-5	50			
Labour	12	4	0	+4	27.3			
Liberal	2	0	0	0	4.5			
Independent	8	0	1	-1	18.2			

== Ward results ==
All Saints
Party	Candidate	Votes	%	±%
Labour	Stephen Charles Cocks	1561		
Independent	George Chatterton	1480		
Labour	Christopher Sydney Turner	1313		
Labour	Kenneth Trevor Powell	1147		
Conservative	Irene Beatrice Greenhalgh	1145		
Liberal	Robert Michael Love	1012		
Turnout				
Labour win (new seat)				
Independent win (new seat)				
Labour win (new seat)				

Barmoor
Party	Candidate	Votes	%	±%
Independent	Harold Henry Cartledge	622	73.35	
Labour	Peter Keith Jones	226	26.65	
Majority		396	46.70	
Turnout		848	81.1	
Independent win (new seat)				

Barms
Party	Candidate	Votes	%	±%
Labour	Alfred Henry Hitchings	1467		
Labour	Barbara Mary Langham	1108		
Conservative	Albert Peter Inglefield	801		
Conservative	Cecil George Wallace	720		
Turnout			83.7	
Labour win (new seat)				
Labour win (new seat)				

Blackbrook
Party	Candidate	Votes	%	±%
Conservative	Betty Patricia Colley	unopposed		
Liberal	George Harry White	unopposed		
Conservative win (new seat)				
Liberal win (new seat)				

Buxton Central
Party	Candidate	Votes	%	±%
Conservative	Dennis Raymond Walter	unopposed		
Conservative win (new seat)				

Chapel East
Party	Candidate	Votes	%	±%
Independent	Albert Phillips	622	55.59	
Conservative	Cheryl Mary Dawson	337	30.11	
Independent	Desmond Francis Bryan	160	14.30	
Majority		285	25.47	
Turnout		1119	82.0	
Independent win (new seat)				

Chapel West
Party	Candidate	Votes	%	±%
Conservative	Muriel Bertha Bradbury	unopposed		
Conservative	Kenneth Victor Bradwell	unopposed		
Conservative win (new seat)				
Conservative win (new seat)				

College
Party	Candidate	Votes	%	±%
Conservative	Elizabeth Jane Inglefield	unopposed		
Conservative	Joyce Mary Craufurd-Stuart	unopposed		
Conservative win (new seat)				
Conservative win (new seat)				

Corbar
Party	Candidate	Votes	%	±%
Conservative	Margaret Beatrice Millican	1219		
Conservative	Alan Keith Allman	1034		
Labour	Robert Garside	590		
Turnout			72.9	
Conservative win (new seat)				
Conservative win (new seat)				

Cote Heath
Party	Candidate	Votes	%	±%
Independent	Terence Garrie Gill	910		
Labour	Noel Ratcliffe	824		
Conservative	Dennis Roy Surrey	654		
Conservative	Heather Michelle Robinson	491		
Independent	Iris Tamsons	397		
Turnout			68.6	
Independent win (new seat)				
Labour win (new seat)				

Gamesley
Party	Candidate	Votes	%	±%
Labour	John Francis	1420		
Labour	Richard John Cooke	1346		
Conservative	Harry Lemon	498		
Conservative	Lynn Watson	460		
Communist	Robert Ainsworth Heald	37		
Turnout			77.2	
Labour win (new seat)				
Labour win (new seat)				

Hayfield
Party	Candidate	Votes	%	±%
Independent	Fred Barnes	854	57.16	
Conservative	Herbert David Mellor	407	27.24	
Labour	David John Wilcox	233	15.60	
Majority		447	29.92	
Turnout		1494	80.0	
Independent win (new seat)				

Ladybower
Party	Candidate	Votes	%	±%
Conservative	George Albert Bingham	775	82.53	
Labour	James Stanley Byford	164	17.47	
Majority		611	65.07	
Turnout		939	82.1	
Conservative win (new seat)				

Limestone Peak
Party	Candidate	Votes	%	±%
Independent	Evelyn May Tomlinson	unopposed		
Independent win (new seat)				

New Mills North
Party	Candidate	Votes	%	±%
Conservative	Dorothy May Brennand	1574		
Conservative	Dorothy Mary Livesley	1571		
Conservative	John Edward Mone	1545		
Liberal	Graham Martin Doughty	1525		
Labour	Stephen John Herbert Dearden	1152		
Turnout				
Conservative win (new seat)				
Conservative win (new seat)				
Conservative win (new seat)				

New Mills South
Party	Candidate	Votes	%	±%
Conservative	John Keith McMurray	1226		
Liberal	Harry Norman Burfoot	1155		
Labour	Lawrence Gordon Allen	858		
Conservative	Frank Morris Bullough	758		
Labour	Dorothy Edna Fryman	424		
Turnout				
Conservative win (new seat)				
Liberal win (new seat)				

Peveril
Party	Candidate	Votes	%	±%
Conservative	Charles David Lewis	unopposed		
Conservative win (new seat)				

St. Andrew's
Party	Candidate	Votes	%	±%
Conservative	Michael Jackson	1125		
Conservative	Ronald Ferguson	1077		
Labour	Josephine Elizabeth Hopkin	1065		
Labour	John Alfred Pagett	1048		
Communist	Juleen Barbara Clarke	83		
Turnout			78.4	
Conservative win (new seat)				
Conservative win (new seat)				

St. Charles'
Party	Candidate	Votes	%	±%
Labour	David Holtom	1218		
Labour	Francis Walter Stubbs	1115		
Conservative	Cynthia Violet Mitchell	787		
Conservative	Denys Toole	777		
Communist	Terence O’Toole	119		
Turnout			76.6	
Labour win (new seat)				
Labour win (new seat)				

St. James'
Party	Candidate	Votes	%	±%
Conservative	George Wharmby	1513		
Conservative	Kenneth Guy Dickenson	1422		
Conservative	Alfred Edwin Jenner Leney	1407		
Labour	Reginald Mann	1353		
Labour	Ceilia Ashton	1323		
Labour	David Carr	1308		
Turnout			71.2	
Conservative win (new seat)				
Conservative win (new seat)				
Conservative win (new seat)				

St John's
Party	Candidate	Votes	%	±%
Conservative	Brenda Tetlow	934	82.00	
Labour	Joan Wilcox	205	18.00	
Majority		729	64.00	
Turnout		1139	83.6	
Conservative win (new seat)				

Simmondley
Party	Candidate	Votes	%	±%
Conservative	William Roderick Heath	674	43.07	
Labour	Michael William Slattery	470	30.03	
Liberal	Joyce Ashley	421	26.90	
Majority		204	13.04	
Turnout		1565	82.5	
Conservative win (new seat)				

Stone Bench
Party	Candidate	Votes	%	±%
Labour	William Barton Morley	1577		
Labour	James Henry Poulton	1398		
Conservative	Alexander Taylor-Clague	553		
Turnout			75.6	
Labour win (new seat)				
Labour win (new seat)				

Tintwistle
Party	Candidate	Votes	%	±%
Labour	Ralph Bennett	480	51.67	
Conservative	Clifford Pennington	449	48.33	
Majority		31	3.33	
Turnout		929	86.0	
Labour win (new seat)				

Whaley Bridge
Party	Candidate	Votes	%	±%
Independent	John Arthur Thomas Pritchard	2193		
Independent	Fredrick Bonsall Woodward	1854		
Conservative	Harold Hastings Littlewood	1601		
Labour	Martin Struan Burch	1203		
Labour	George Kenneth Brown	1147		
Conservative	Bernard George Everett	887		
Turnout				
Independent win (new seat)				
Independent win (new seat)				
Conservative win (new seat)				
