= 1991 High Peak Borough Council election =

1991 UK local government election

Elections to High Peak Borough Council in Derbyshire, England were held on 2 May 1991. All of the council was up for election and the council stayed under no overall control.

After the election, the composition of the council was:

- Labour 16
- Conservative 14
- Liberal Democrat 10
- Independent 4

== Election result ==
High Peak local election result 1991
Party	Seats	Gains	Losses	Net gain/loss	Seats %	Votes %	Votes	+/−
Labour	16	6	1	+5	36.36			
Conservative	14	0	3	-3	31.82			
Liberal Democrats	10	3	0	+3	22.73			
Independent	4	0	5	-5	9.09			

== Ward results ==
All Saints
Party	Candidate	Votes	%	±%
Labour	Roger Wilkinson	1159	40.1	
Labour	David Bond	1111		
Labour	Lilian Whitson	1086		
Conservative	Thomas Farnsworth	1031	35.7	
Conservative	Frank Postlethwaite	990		
Conservative	Michael Wendon	881		
Liberal Democrats	Goinden Kuppan	371	12.8	
Green	Roy Winterbottom	328	11.4	
Green	Ian Lee Webb	240		
Green	Susan Anne Ledger	240		
Turnout			53.5	
Labour gain from Independent		Swing		
Labour gain from Conservative		Swing		
Labour hold		Swing		

Barmoor
Party	Candidate	Votes	%	±%
Independent	Brian Millward	307	55.02	
Conservative	Derek Walter Udale	166	29.75	
Labour	Ian Stuart Waddell	85	15.23	
Majority		141	25.26	
Turnout		558	52.1	
Independent hold		Swing		

Barms
Party	Candidate	Votes	%	±%
Labour	Ann Mone	655	42.2	
Labour	Andrew Uprichard	589		
Conservative	Terence Corrigan	559	36.0	
Conservative	Margaret Mary Williams	543		
Liberal Democrats	David Allwright	180	11.6	
Green	Karen Thompson Beswick	160	10.3	
Green	Susan Mortin	120		
Turnout			52.5	
Labour gain from Independent		Swing		
Labour hold		Swing		

Blackbrook
Party	Candidate	Votes	%	±%
Liberal Democrats	Peter John Ashenden	893	46.5	
Liberal Democrats	Susan Mary Burns	641		
Conservative	Peter Coackley	617	32.2	
Conservative	Donald Gifford Crow	569		
Labour	Andrew Ayres	241	12.6	
Green	Catherine Tattersfield	168	8.8	
Turnout			60.7	
Liberal Democrats hold		Swing		
Liberal Democrats gain from Independent		Swing		

Buxton Central
Party	Candidate	Votes	%	±%
Conservative	Joan Mary Chape	333	47.57	
Liberal Democrats	Michael Francis Bryant	254	36.29	
Green	Roger Martin Floyd	113	16.14	
Turnout		700	50.7	
Majority		79	11.28	
Conservative hold		Swing		

Chapel East
Party	Candidate	Votes	%	±%
Liberal Democrats	James Edward George Boote	439	53.28	
Labour	Trevor William Trimmer	214	25.97	
Conservative	Janice Elaine Bancroft	171	20.75	
Majority		225	27.31	
Turnout		824	54.3	
Liberal Democrats hold		Swing		

Chapel West
Party	Candidate	Votes	%	±%
Conservative	Ann Stewart Young	681	23.6	
Independent	Muriel Bertha Bradbury	590	20.4	
Independent	Frank Peter Harrison	494	17.1	
Green	Jayne Pamela Mellor	414	14.3	
Liberal Democrats	John Frank Weigold	392	13.6	
Labour	Jane Ayres	321	11.1	
Turnout			49.4	
Conservative hold		Swing		
Independent hold		Swing		

College
Party	Candidate	Votes	%	±%
Conservative	Elizabeth Jane Inglefield	749	51.1	
Conservative	Alan Keith Allman	734		
Liberal Democrats	Hillary Allwright	461	31.5	
Green	Christopher Martin Pearson	256	17.5	
Green	Justin Robert Clements	254		
Turnout			50.9	
Conservative hold		Swing		
Conservative hold		Swing		

Corbar
Party	Candidate	Votes	%	±%
Conservative	Peter De Leighton Brooke	682	48.5	
Conservative	Margaret Beatrice Millican	664		
Liberal Democrats	Kenneth Rooker	262	18.6	
Labour	Valerie Mason	256	18.2	
Green	Rodney Dugdale	207	14.7	
Green	Derek Alfred Jones	173		
Turnout			47.5	
Conservative hold		Swing		
Conservative hold		Swing		

Cote Heath
Party	Candidate	Votes	%	±%
Liberal Democrats	Michael Robert Leslie Loader	861	44.8	
Liberal Democrats	Peter Campbell Newsam	677		
Labour	Philip Mone	609	31.7	
Labour	Jane Ann McGrother	506		
Conservative	Kenneth David Graham Kirk	452	23.5	
Turnout			49.7	
Liberal Democrats hold		Swing		
Liberal Democrats hold		Swing		

Gamesley
Party	Candidate	Votes	%	±%
Labour	John Francis	1045	83.2	
Labour	Richard John Cooke	957		
Independent	Elsie Sayers	110	9.1	
Green	Marie-Helene Thomas-Jones	92	7.7	
Turnout			52.1	
Labour hold		Swing		
Labour hold		Swing		

Hayfield
Party	Candidate	Votes	%	±%
Conservative	Herbert David Mellor	633	53.96	
Labour	Colin Michael Divall	312	26.60	
Green	Judith Milling	128	10.91	
Liberal Democrats	Douglas Malcolm Bruce	100	8.53	
Majority		321	27.37	
Turnout		1173	57.6	
Conservative hold		Swing		

Ladybower
Party	Candidate	Votes	%	±%
Conservative	George Albert Bingham	473	61.35	
Labour	Gillian Taylor	177	22.96	
Green	Angela Mary Ayres	121	15.69	
Majority		296	38.39	
Turnout		771	62.5	
Conservative hold		Swing		

Limestone Peak
Party	Candidate	Votes	%	±%
Independent	Evelyn May Thomlinson	361	51.28	
Liberal Democrats	Joyce Allwright	248	35.23	
Labour	Michael John Westley	95	13.49	
Majority		113	16.05	
Turnout		704	55.0	
Independent hold		Swing		

New Mills North
Party	Candidate	Votes	%	±%
Liberal Democrats	Roy Bickerton	1038	32.2	
Conservative	Dorothy May Brennand	807	28.8	
Conservative	Dorothy Mary Livesley	724		
Labour	Kevin John Worthington	717	28.8	
Labour	Sheila Elizabeth Rae	705		
Labour	Charmain Bernadette Levin	685		
Liberal Democrats	Margaret Helen Redfern	668		
Liberal Democrats	Alan Michael Fieldsend	653		
Conservative	Christopher Barnes	575		
Green	Freda Kathleen Chapman	248	10.2	
Turnout			61.1	
Liberal Democrats hold		Swing		
Conservative hold		Swing		
Conservative hold		Swing		

New Mills South
Party	Candidate	Votes	%	±%
Liberal Democrats	Harry Norman Burfoot	812	49.2	
Liberal Democrats	Stephen John Herbert Dearden	696		
Labour	Marion Williams	671	42.4	
Labour	Donald Peace Rae	629		
Green	Michael John Shipley	139	8.4	
Green	Michael Jonathan Rowles	117		
Turnout			52.4	
Liberal Democrats hold		Swing		
Liberal Democrats gain from Labour		Swing		

Peveril
Party	Candidate	Votes	%	±%
Conservative	Ronald Ernest Priestley	563	62.76	
Labour	Brian Gerald Hudson	212	23.63	
Independent (politician)	Angela Helen Kellie	122	13.60	
Majority		351	39.13	
Turnout		897	53.2	
Conservative hold		Swing		

St. Andrew's
Party	Candidate	Votes	%	±%
Labour	Mary Kathleen Holtom	962	52.5	
Labour	John Hallsworth	890		
Conservative	Olive MacKay	493	28.0	
Liberal Democrats	Lyn Edwards	345	19.6	
Turnout			52.2	
Labour hold		Swing		
Labour hold		Swing		

St. Charles'
Party	Candidate	Votes	%	±%
Labour	David Holtom	870	49.7	
Labour	Francis Walter Stubbs	845		
Conservative	Celia May Bloomer	391	21.1	
Liberal Democrats	David Colin Curzon	322	17.4	
Green	Iain Coram	219	11.8	
Turnout			49.0	
Labour hold		Swing		
Labour hold		Swing		

St. James'
Party	Candidate	Votes	%	±%
Labour	Norman Patrick Garlick	895	36.2	
Labour	Arthur Harrison Gilbert	884		
Conservative	Leslie Ernest Proctor	831	33.6	
Labour	Jacqueline Margaret Wilkinson	827		
Conservative	Graham Turner Buckley	815		
Conservative	Barbara Sharpe	806		
Liberal Democrats	Marjorie Jane Chapman	400	16.2	
Green	Geoffrey Keith Oliver	347	14.0	
Green	Evelyn Lesley Wilson	283		
Green	Michael Jonathan Lindley	278		
Turnout			54.5	
Labour gain from Conservative		Swing		
Labour gain from Conservative		Swing		
Conservative hold		Swing		

St John's
Party	Candidate	Votes	%	±%
Conservative	Brenda Tetlow	651	64.26	
Liberal Democrats	Christopher Frank Harbut	224	22.11	
Labour	Peter Roy Urquhart	138	13.62	
Majority		427	42.15	
Turnout		1013	56.4	
Conservative hold		Swing		

Simmondley
Party	Candidate	Votes	%	±%
Conservative	Peter Jeffrey Sidebottom	454	37.34	
Liberal Democrats	Gerald Seymour Wood	417	34.29	
Labour	Reginald Grills	291	23.93	
Green	Diana Lilian Virgo	54	4.44	
Majority		37	3.04	
Turnout		1216	55.3	
Conservative hold		Swing		

Stone Bench
Party	Candidate	Votes	%	±%
Labour	Raymond Vernon Browne	833	60.5	
Labour	James Henry Poulton	820		
Conservative	David Redford Allsop	323	23.5	
Liberal Democrats	Peter Francis Clayton	221	16.1	
Turnout			45.9	
Labour hold		Swing		
Labour hold		Swing		

Tintwistle
Party	Candidate	Votes	%	±%
Labour	Joyce Brocklehurst	372	54.47	
Conservative	Wright Brownhill Cooper	311	45.53	
Majority		61	8.93	
Turnout		683	63.0	
Labour gain from Independent		Swing		

Whaley Bridge
Party	Candidate	Votes	%	±%
Liberal Democrats	Constance Ann Smith	1183	27.9	
Independent	John Arthur Thomas Pritchard	1178	27.8	
Liberal Democrats	David William Lomax	1174		
Labour	John Bottomley	967	22.8	
Conservative	Susan Jane Wallwork	348	21.5	
Turnout			56.2	
Liberal Democrats gain from Independent		Swing		
Independent hold		Swing		
Liberal Democrats hold		Swing		
