= 1999 High Peak Borough Council election =

1999 UK local government election

Elections to High Peak Borough Council in Derbyshire, England were held on 6 May 1999. All of the council was up for election and the Labour Party stayed in control of the council.

After the election, the composition of the council was:

- Labour 27
- Conservative 10
- Liberal Democrat 5
- Independent 2

== Election result ==
High Peak local election result 1999
| Party | Seats | Gains | Losses | Net gain/loss | Seats % | Votes % | Votes | +/− |
|---|---|---|---|---|---|---|---|---|
| Labour | 27 | 1 | 4 | -3 | 61.4 | | | |
| Conservative | 10 | 5 | 0 | +5 | 22.7 | | | |
| Liberal Democrats | 5 | 1 | 2 | -1 | 11.4 | | | |
| Independent | 2 | 0 | 1 | -1 | 4.5 | | | |

== Ward results ==
All Saints
| Party | Candidate | Votes | % | ±% |
|---|---|---|---|---|
| Labour | David Bond | 970 | | |
| Labour | Roger Wilkinson | 908 | | |
| Labour | Richard Rowbotham | 847 | | |
| Liberal Democrats | Anne Shaw | 712 | | |
| Conservative | Jean Wharmby | 539 | | |
| Liberal Democrats | Gerald Pleat | 499 | | |
| Liberal Democrats | Goinden Kuppan | 473 | | |
| Turnout | | | | |
| Labour hold | | Swing | | |
| Labour hold | | Swing | | |
| Labour hold | | Swing | | |

Barmoor
| Party | Candidate | Votes | % | ±% |
|---|---|---|---|---|
| Liberal Democrats | Ian Galloway | 284 | 87.1 | |
| Labour | Robert Adderley | 42 | 12.9 | |
| Majority | | 242 | 74.23 | |
| Turnout | | 326 | | |
| Liberal Democrats gain from Independent | | Swing | | |

Barms
| Party | Candidate | Votes | % | ±% |
|---|---|---|---|---|
| Labour | Ann Mone | 555 | | |
| Labour | Andrew Uprichard | 505 | | |
| Conservative | Donald Sparkes | 251 | | |
| Conservative | Iris Sparkes | 242 | | |
| Liberal Democrats | Raymond Wild | 131 | | |
| Turnout | | | | |
| Labour hold | | Swing | | |
| Labour hold | | Swing | | |

Blackbrook
| Party | Candidate | Votes | % | ±% |
|---|---|---|---|---|
| Liberal Democrats | Brian Hallsworth | 594 | | |
| Conservative | Norman Salisbury | 550 | | |
| Conservative | Ann Laister | 510 | | |
| Liberal Democrats | Duncan Layland | 474 | | |
| Labour | Suzanne Richards | 260 | | |
| Turnout | | | | |
| Liberal Democrats hold | | Swing | | |
| Conservative gain from Liberal Democrats | | Swing | | |

Buxton Central
| Party | Candidate | Votes | % | ±% |
|---|---|---|---|---|
| Labour | Jane Anne McGrother | 345 | 50.4 | |
| Conservative | William Norman | 259 | 37.9 | |
| Liberal Democrats | Roger Iredale | 80 | 11.7 | |
| Turnout | | 684 | | |
| Majority | | 86 | 12.57 | |
| Labour hold | | Swing | | |

Chapel East
| Party | Candidate | Votes | % | ±% |
|---|---|---|---|---|
| Labour | Norman Prime | 215 | 40.9 | |
| Liberal Democrats | Dale Tomlin | 213 | 40.5 | |
| Conservative | Gary Fletcher | 98 | 18.6 | |
| Majority | | 2 | 0.4 | |
| Turnout | | 526 | | |
| Labour gain from Liberal Democrats | | Swing | | |

Chapel West
| Party | Candidate | Votes | % | ±% |
|---|---|---|---|---|
| Conservative | Andrew Russell Bingham | 551 | | |
| Labour | Timothy Ian Norton | 530 | | |
| Independent | Peter Harrison | 495 | | |
| Labour | Gillian Harris | 435 | | |
| Conservative | Haider El Hasan | 255 | | |
| Liberal Democrats | Anthony Boore | 122 | | |
| Liberal Democrats | Alan Debes | 116 | | |
| Turnout | | | | |
| Conservative gain from Independent | | Swing | | |
| Labour hold | | Swing | | |

College
| Party | Candidate | Votes | % | ±% |
|---|---|---|---|---|
| Conservative | Terry Corrigan | 739 | | |
| Conservative | Glynis Kirk | 712 | | |
| Labour | Martin Bisknell | 387 | | |
| Liberal Democrats | Christopher Weaver | 286 | | |
| Turnout | | | | |
| Conservative hold | | Swing | | |
| Conservative hold | | Swing | | |

Corbar
| Party | Candidate | Votes | % | ±% |
|---|---|---|---|---|
| Conservative | Clive Beattie | 581 | | |
| Conservative | Alan Wells | 542 | | |
| Labour | Jeanette Hamilton | 378 | | |
| Liberal Democrats | Mavis Iredale | 223 | | |
| Turnout | | | | |
| Conservative gain from Labour | | Swing | | |
| Conservative hold | | Swing | | |

Cote Heath
| Party | Candidate | Votes | % | ±% |
|---|---|---|---|---|
| Labour | Philip Mone | 680 | | |
| Labour | John Wilson | 612 | | |
| Conservative | David MacDowell | 334 | | |
| Conservative | Sue De Silva | 318 | | |
| Liberal Democrats | Stephanie Noble | 289 | | |
| Turnout | | | | |
| Labour hold | | Swing | | |
| Labour hold | | Swing | | |

Gamesley
| Party | Candidate | Votes | % | ±% |
|---|---|---|---|---|
| Labour | John Francis | 652 | | |
| Labour | Anthony Edward McKeown | 549 | | |
| Liberal Democrats | Jean Grundy | 76 | | |
| Labour hold | | Swing | | |
| Labour hold | | Swing | | |

Hayfield
| Party | Candidate | Votes | % | ±% |
|---|---|---|---|---|
| Independent | Herbert David Mellor | 576 | 60.6 | |
| Labour | Jane Ayres | 314 | 33.1 | |
| Liberal Democrats | Audrey Burfoot | 60 | 6.3 | |
| Majority | | 262 | 27.58 | |
| Turnout | | 950 | | |
| Independent hold | | Swing | | |

Ladybower
| Party | Candidate | Votes | % | ±% |
|---|---|---|---|---|
| Conservative | Stuart Ollerenshaw | 320 | 50.7 | |
| Labour | Ian Wingfield | 260 | 41.2 | |
| Liberal Democrats | Jane Simm | 51 | 8.1 | |
| Majority | | 60 | 9.5 | |
| Turnout | | 631 | | |
| Conservative gain from Labour | | Swing | | |

Limestone Peak
| Party | Candidate | Votes | % | ±% |
|---|---|---|---|---|
| Conservative | Derek Walter Udale | 234 | 52.3 | |
| Labour | Garry Bellas | 159 | 35.6 | |
| Liberal Democrats | Stuart Winter | 54 | 12.1 | |
| Majority | | 75 | 16.8 | |
| Turnout | | 447 | | |
| Conservative gain from Labour | | Swing | | |

New Mills North
| Party | Candidate | Votes | % | ±% |
|---|---|---|---|---|
| Liberal Democrats | Roy Bickerton | 875 | | |
| Labour | Liam Bernard Mycroft | 707 | | |
| Labour | Lance Dowson | 675 | | |
| Conservative | Chris Barnes | 654 | | |
| Liberal Democrats | David Gladding | 543 | | |
| Conservative | Zoe Bowden | 531 | | |
| Liberal Democrats | Trevor Jefcoate | 502 | | |
| Turnout | | | | |
| Liberal Democrats hold | | Swing | | |
| Labour hold | | Swing | | |
| Labour hold | | Swing | | |

New Mills South
| Party | Candidate | Votes | % | ±% |
|---|---|---|---|---|
| Labour | Ian Huddlestone | 571 | | |
| Labour | Marion Williams | 559 | | |
| Liberal Democrats | William Brindley | 412 | | |
| Liberal Democrats | Stephen Dearden | 331 | | |
| Conservative | Chris Saunders | 147 | | |
| Turnout | | | | |
| Labour hold | | Swing | | |
| Labour hold | | Swing | | |

Peveril
| Party | Candidate | Votes | % | ±% |
|---|---|---|---|---|
| Conservative | Ronald Ernest Priestley | 457 | 53.4 | |
| Labour | Terence Skelton | 284 | 33.2 | |
| Liberal Democrats | Dorothy Challand | 115 | 13.4 | |
| Majority | | 173 | 20.2 | |
| Turnout | | 856 | | |
| Conservative hold | | Swing | | |

St. Andrew's
| Party | Candidate | Votes | % | ±% |
|---|---|---|---|---|
| Labour | John Hallsworth | 639 | | |
| Labour | Norman Garlick | 626 | | |
| Conservative | Marie Foote | 240 | | |
| Liberal Democrats | Nicholas Cotter | 217 | | |
| Turnout | | | | |
| Labour hold | | Swing | | |
| Labour hold | | Swing | | |

St. Charles'
| Party | Candidate | Votes | % | ±% |
|---|---|---|---|---|
| Labour | Catherine Carr | 579 | | |
| Labour | Gwyneth Francis | 532 | | |
| Liberal Democrats | David Curzon | 226 | | |
| Conservative | Stephen Foote | 223 | | |
| Turnout | | | | |
| Labour hold | | Swing | | |
| Labour hold | | Swing | | |

St. James'
| Party | Candidate | Votes | % | ±% |
|---|---|---|---|---|
| Labour | Jacqui Wilkinson | 777 | | |
| Labour | Godfrey Claff | 760 | | |
| Labour | Arthur Gilbert | 750 | | |
| Conservative | George Wharmby | 562 | | |
| Conservative | Robin Basil Baldry | 450 | | |
| Liberal Democrats | Susan Clarke | 374 | | |
| Liberal Democrats | Rhona Griffiths | 253 | | |
| Turnout | | | | |
| Labour hold | | Swing | | |
| Labour hold | | Swing | | |
| Labour hold | | Swing | | |

St John's
| Party | Candidate | Votes | % | ±% |
|---|---|---|---|---|
| Conservative | Anne Worrall | 411 | 47.1 | |
| Liberal Democrats | Chris Harbut | 359 | 41.1 | |
| Labour | Peter Keelan | 103 | 11.8 | |
| Majority | | 52 | 5.96 | |
| Turnout | | 873 | | |
| Conservative hold | | Swing | | |

Simmondley
| Party | Candidate | Votes | % | ±% |
|---|---|---|---|---|
| Liberal Democrats | Robert Hadfield-Howse | 444 | 50.2 | |
| Labour | Graham Oakley | 233 | 26.3 | |
| Conservative | Chris Webster | 208 | 23.5 | |
| Majority | | 211 | 23.8 | |
| Turnout | | 885 | | |
| Liberal Democrats gain from Labour | | Swing | | |

Stone Bench
| Party | Candidate | Votes | % | ±% |
|---|---|---|---|---|
| Labour | Caitlin Janette Bisknell | 583 | | |
| Labour | Barbara June Wilson | 554 | | |
| Conservative | Rosemary Byatte | 213 | | |
| Conservative | Alex Hopkins | 189 | | |
| Liberal Democrats | Maxine Wild | 48 | | |
| Turnout | | | | |
| Labour hold | | Swing | | |
| Labour hold | | Swing | | |

Tintwistle
| Party | Candidate | Votes | % | ±% |
|---|---|---|---|---|
| Labour | Joyce Brocklehurst | 223 | 54.8 | |
| Conservative | Neville Cross | 157 | 38.6 | |
| Liberal Democrats | Maisie Harbut | 27 | 6.6 | |
| Majority | | 66 | 16.2 | |
| Turnout | | 407 | | |
| Labour hold | | Swing | | |

Whaley Bridge
| Party | Candidate | Votes | % | ±% |
|---|---|---|---|---|
| Liberal Democrats | David William Lomax | 1117 | | |
| Independent | John Arthur Thomas Pritchard | 943 | | |
| Labour | Henry Playford | 745 | | |
| Labour | Jean Horsfall | 734 | | |
| Liberal Democrats | Lesley Kaufman | 712 | | |
| Independent | Linda Leather | 696 | | |
| Conservative | Mark Thomas | 262 | | |
| Turnout | | | | |
| Liberal Democrats hold | | Swing | | |
| Independent hold | | Swing | | |
| Labour hold | | Swing | | |
