= 2007 High Peak Borough Council election =

2007 UK local government election

Results of the 2007 High Peak Borough Council election

Elections to High Peak Borough Council in Derbyshire, England were held on 3 May 2007. All of the council was up for election and the control of the council changed from no overall control to Conservative control. Overall turnout was 38.2%.

After the election, the composition of the council was:

- Conservative 24
- Labour 9
- Liberal Democrat 6
- Independent 4

== Election result ==
High Peak local election result 2007
Party	Seats	Gains	Losses	Net gain/loss	Seats %	Votes %	Votes	+/−
Conservative	24	12	0	+12	55.8			
Labour	9	1	10	-9	20.9			
Liberal Democrats	6	1	2	-1	13.9			
Independent	4	0	2	-2	9.3			
Socialist Labour	0	0	0	0	0		215	
Green	0	0	0	0	0		85	

== Ward results ==
Barms
Party	Candidate	Votes	%	±%
Conservative	Bill Barratt	228	42.7	
Labour	Rachael Quinn	224	41.9	
Liberal Democrats	Emma Louise Robinson Moss	80	15.0	
Majority		4	0.8	N/A
Turnout		534	34.59	+1.08
Conservative gain from Independent		Swing		

Blackbrook
Party	Candidate	Votes	%	±%
Conservative	Chris Pearson	959		
Conservative	Tony Bingham	782		
Liberal Democrats	Peter John Ashenden	649		
Liberal Democrats	Stephen Anthony Waters	470		
Turnout		1500	47.62	+3.97
Conservative hold		Swing		
Conservative gain from Liberal Democrats		Swing		

Burbage
Party	Candidate	Votes	%	±%
Conservative	John Ronald Silverwood Faulkner	460	77.4	
Labour	John Farmer	127	21.4	
Majority		333	56.0	
Turnout		594	38.82	+1.02
Conservative hold		Swing		

Buxton Central
Party	Candidate	Votes	%	±%
Conservative	Jonathan Phillip Davey	470		
Conservative	Bill Fiddy	462		
Liberal Democrats	Marc Godwin	384		
Liberal Democrats	Louise Ellen Hardy	363		
Labour	Jane Anne McGrother	356		
Labour	Philip John Mone	304		
Turnout		1218	39.76	+4.25
Conservative gain from Labour		Swing		
Conservative gain from Labour		Swing		

Chapel East
Party	Candidate	Votes	%	±%
Liberal Democrats	Mike Harrison	280	42.7	
Conservative	Dennis Buffrey	266	40.5	
Labour	Frederick William Ollier	110	16.7	
Majority		14	2.13	
Turnout		656	37.13	+0.56
Liberal Democrats hold		Swing		

Chapel West
Party	Candidate	Votes	%	±%
Conservative	Andrew Russell Bingham	764		
Conservative	Stewart Paul Young	473		
Labour	Timothy Ian Norton	438		
Independent	Peter Harrison	344		
Liberal Democrats	Diane Bayirli	291		
Liberal Democrats	Brian Colin Hallsworth	175		
Turnout		1388	42.32	+6.63
Conservative hold		Swing		
Conservative gain from Labour		Swing		

Corbar
Party	Candidate	Votes	%	±%
Conservative	Linda June Baldry	623		
Conservative	Tony Arthur Kemp	569		
Labour	Colin Richard Brett	243		
Independent	William Alan Wells	216		
Liberal Democrats	Christopher Richard Warhurst Weaver	208		
Turnout		1215	42.59	+9.27
Conservative hold		Swing		
Conservative hold		Swing		

Cote Heath
Party	Candidate	Votes	%	±%
Conservative	Robin Basil Baldry	540		
Conservative	Bob Morris	538		
Labour	Ann Mone	395		
Labour	Martin Walter Thomas	305		
Liberal Democrats	Karl Raymond Dunscombe	186		
Turnout		1059	35.18	−14.67
Conservative gain from Labour		Swing		
Conservative gain from Labour		Swing		

Dinting
Party	Candidate	Votes	%	±%
Conservative	Jean Wharmby	454	58.5	
Labour	Sam McMeekin	124	16.0	
Green	Pat Ellison-Reed	85	10.9	
Independent	Michael Graham Perry	63	8.1	
Liberal Democrats	Ian Fletcher	49	6.3	
Majority		330	42.5	
Turnout		776	52.19	+8.13
Conservative hold		Swing		

Gamesley
Party	Candidate	Votes	%	±%
Labour	Anthony Edward McKeown	249	57.1	
Independent	Richard Cunningham	145	33.2	
Liberal Democrats	Graham Boardman	38	8.7	
Majority		104	23.8	
Turnout		436	25.47	+25.47
Labour hold		Swing		

Hadfield North
Party	Candidate	Votes	%	±%
Labour	Victoria Elizabeth Mann	226	50.7	
Conservative	Dave Kelly	149	33.4	
Liberal Democrats	Sandra Batey	89	13.2	
Majority		77	17.26	
Turnout		446	31.94	+31.94
Labour hold		Swing		

Hadfield South
Party	Candidate	Votes	%	±%
Labour	Bob McKeown	455		
Conservative	Marie Melita Foote	433		
Conservative	Stephen Dennis William Foote	430		
Labour	Peter Edward Siddall	381		
Liberal Democrats	Maureen Anne Hargreaves	252		
Independent	Albert Edward Spilsbury	141		
Turnout		1141	33.83	+6.69
Labour hold		Swing		
Conservative gain from Labour		Swing		

Hayfield
Party	Candidate	Votes	%	±%
Independent	Herbert David Mellor	unopposed	N/A	
Independent hold		Swing		

Hope Valley
Party	Candidate	Votes	%	±%
Conservative	Tony Favell	925		
Conservative	John Walton	784		
Liberal Democrats	Jane Simm	579		
Turnout		1454	45.51	+2.8
Conservative hold		Swing		
Conservative hold		Swing		

Howard Town
Party	Candidate	Votes	%	±%
Labour	Jacqueline Wilkinson	523		
Labour	Roger Wilkinson	467		
Conservative	George David Wharmby	341		
Liberal Democrats	Peter John Michael William Beard	301		
Conservative	David Charles McDowell	217		
Turnout		1067	33.95	+3.32
Labour hold		Swing		
Labour hold		Swing		

Limestone Peak
Party	Candidate	Votes	%	±%
Conservative	Derek Walter Udale	365	57.3	
Liberal Democrats	Graham Scott	264	41.4	
Majority		101	15.9	
Turnout		637	37.71	+5.09
Conservative hold		Swing		

New Mills East
Party	Candidate	Votes	%	±%
Liberal Democrats	Mark Gadd	508		
Labour	Ian Samuel Edward Huddlestone	488		
Liberal Democrats	Alistair John Stevens	476		
Labour	Alan Barrow	448		
Conservative	Annette Laurraine Longden	260		
Turnout		1185	37.50	+10.55
Liberal Democrats gain from Labour		Swing		
Labour hold		Swing		

New Mills West
Party	Candidate	Votes	%	±%
Liberal Democrats	Ray Atkins	845		
Liberal Democrats	Steve Sharp	709		
Independent	Lance Dowson	643		
Conservative	Marie Clair	313		
Turnout		1453	43.44	+4.05
Liberal Democrats hold		Swing		
Liberal Democrats hold		Swing		

Old Glossop
Party	Candidate	Votes	%	±%
Independent	Chris Webster	779		
Independent	Ivan Bell	758		
Conservative	David Novakovic	400		
Labour	David John Mellor	333		
Liberal Democrats	Chantal Hanell	160		
Turnout		1440	39.13	−3.69
Independent hold		Swing		
Independent hold		Swing		

Padfield
Party	Candidate	Votes	%	±%
Conservative	Peter James Kay	251	34.86	
Liberal Democrats	Jonathan Douglas Smith	250	34.72	
Labour	Ellie Wilcox	217	30.14	
Majority		1	0.14	
Turnout		720	35.75	+9.36
Conservative gain from Labour		Swing		

Sett
Party	Candidate	Votes	%	±%
Conservative	Tony Ashton	299	39.08	
Liberal Democrats	Janet Carter	269	35.16	
Labour	Sue Barrow	191	24.97	
Majority		30	3.92	
Turnout		765	47.05	+6.31
Conservative hold		Swing		

Simmondley
Party	Candidate	Votes	%	±%
Conservative	John Haken	728		
Conservative	Matthew James Andrew Crompton	727		
Labour	Anne Robinson	468		
Liberal Democrats	George Kupan	337		
Liberal Democrats	Anita Seaton	326		
Turnout		1468	39.17	+8.47
Conservative gain from Liberal Democrats		Swing		
Conservative gain from Labour		Swing		

St John's
Party	Candidate	Votes	%	±%
Conservative	Anne Worrall	493	70.53	
Labour	Rob McKeown	113	16.16	
Liberal Democrats	Tim Baxter	92	13.16	
Majority		380	54.36	
Turnout		699	45.63	+7.18
Conservative hold		Swing		

Stone Bench
Party	Candidate	Votes	%	±%
Labour	Caitlin Janette Bisknell	410		
Labour	Barbara June Wilson	400		
Conservative	Rob Hobdey	368		
Socialist Labour	Lynton Stephen Bennett	215		
Turnout		873	27.63	+3.35
Labour hold		Swing		
Labour hold		Swing		

Temple
Party	Candidate	Votes	%	±%
Conservative	Emily Lilian Thrane	546	75.52	
Labour	Frank Dent	165	22.82	
Majority		381	52.70	
Turnout		723	47.72	+3.70
Conservative hold		Swing		

Tintwistle
Party	Candidate	Votes	%	±%
Conservative	Cynthia Mitchell	320	54.23	
Labour	Joyce Brocklehurst	263	44.58	
Majority		57	9.66	
Turnout		590	35.46	+1.03
Conservative gain from Labour		Swing		

Whaley Bridge
Party	Candidate	Votes	%	±%
Independent	John Arthur Thomas Pritchard	1275		
Liberal Democrats	David William Lomax	1237		
Liberal Democrats	Linda Leather	1117		
Conservative	Tony Boore	767		
Labour	Michael Brunt	515		
Turnout		2161	42.45	+2.14
Independent hold		Swing		
Liberal Democrats hold		Swing		
Liberal Democrats hold		Swing		

Whitfield
Party	Candidate	Votes	%	±%
Labour	Graham Nigel Oakley	297	52.57	
Conservative	David George Wharmby	135	23.89	
Liberal Democrats	Huggy Hawley	132	23.36	
Majority		162	28.67	
Turnout		565	34.62	+0.79
Labour gain from Independent		Swing		
