= 1973 High Peak Borough Council election =

1973 UK local government election

The first elections to High Peak Borough Council in Derbyshire, England were held in 1973. The Borough Council was formed by absorbing the municipal boroughs of Buxton and Glossop, the urban districts of New Mills and Whaley Bridge, and the rural districts of Chapel-en-le-Frith and Tintwistle.

As it was a new borough, all of the council was up for election. No party got an overall majority of councillors, meaning that the council became no overall control.

After the election, the composition of the council was:

- Conservative 23
- Labour 11
- Liberal 2
- Independent 10

== Election result ==
High Peak local election result 1973
| Party | Seats | Gains | Losses | Net gain/loss | Seats % | Votes % | Votes | +/− |
|---|---|---|---|---|---|---|---|---|
| Conservative | 23 | 23 | 0 | +23 | 50 | 33.0 | | |
| Labour | 11 | 11 | 0 | +11 | 23.9 | 29.5 | | |
| Liberal | 2 | 2 | 0 | +2 | 4.4 | 20.4 | | |
| Independent | 10 | 10 | 0 | +10 | 21.7 | 17.1 | | |
| Green | 0 | 0 | 0 | 0 | 0 | | 230 | |
| Communist | 0 | 0 | 0 | 0 | 0 | | | |

== Ward results ==
All Saints
| Party | Candidate | Votes | % | ±% |
|---|---|---|---|---|
| Independent | George Chatterton | 927 | | |
| Independent | Peter Matthews | 690 | | |
| Conservative | Edwin Harold Mountain | 591 | | |
| Labour | Robert Pocklington | 554 | | |
| Labour | Reginald Grills | 479 | | |
| Labour | Kenneth Esplin Bracewell | 458 | | |
| Conservative | William Cowin | 432 | | |
| Conservative | Thomas Herbert Mettham | 399 | | |
| Liberal | Kevin John Hill | 343 | | |
| Green | Geoffrey Thomas Machan | 230 | | |
| Turnout | | | 64.9 | |
| Independent win (new seat) | | | | |
| Independent win (new seat) | | | | |
| Conservative win (new seat) | | | | |

Barmoor
| Party | Candidate | Votes | % | ±% |
|---|---|---|---|---|
| Independent | Oswald Milner | unopposed | | |
| Independent win (new seat) | | | | |

Barms
| Party | Candidate | Votes | % | ±% |
|---|---|---|---|---|
| Labour | Alfred Henry Hitchings | 844 | | |
| Labour | Noel Ratcliffe | 718 | | |
| Conservative | Clive Halliday Pedlow | 411 | | |
| Conservative | Margaret Wood | 370 | | |
| Turnout | | | 52.2 | |
| Labour win (new seat) | | | | |
| Labour win (new seat) | | | | |

Blackbrook
| Party | Candidate | Votes | % | ±% |
|---|---|---|---|---|
| Liberal | George Harry White | 869 | | |
| Independent | Keith Holford | 609 | | |
| Conservative | Gertrude Gordon Sharp | 439 | | |
| Conservative | William John Ayres | 277 | | |
| Turnout | | | 80.9 | |
| Liberal win (new seat) | | | | |
| Independent win (new seat) | | | | |

Buxton Central
| Party | Candidate | Votes | % | ±% |
|---|---|---|---|---|
| Conservative | Dennis Raymond Walter | 371 | 58.80 | |
| Labour | Charles Anthony Scouler | 151 | 23.93 | |
| Liberal | Sylvia June Dunlevy | 109 | 17.27 | |
| Turnout | | 631 | 45.4 | |
| Majority | | 220 | 34.86 | |
| Conservative win (new seat) | | | | |

Chapel East
| Party | Candidate | Votes | % | ±% |
|---|---|---|---|---|
| Independent | Albert Phillips | 385 | 57.81 | |
| Conservative | William Hutchinson | 192 | 28.83 | |
| Liberal | Denis Grundy | 89 | 13.36 | |
| Majority | | 193 | 28.98 | |
| Turnout | | 666 | 50.0 | |
| Independent win (new seat) | | | | |

Chapel West
| Party | Candidate | Votes | % | ±% |
|---|---|---|---|---|
| Conservative | Muriel Bertha Bradbury | 644 | | |
| Conservative | Kenneth Victor Bradwell | 589 | | |
| Labour | Melvyn Wright | 438 | | |
| Liberal | Aubrey Ross-Sharp | 404 | | |
| Labour | Eric Fox | 354 | | |
| Turnout | | | 56.2 | |
| Conservative win (new seat) | | | | |
| Conservative win (new seat) | | | | |

College
| Party | Candidate | Votes | % | ±% |
|---|---|---|---|---|
| Conservative | Elizabeth Jane Allan | unopposed | | |
| Conservative | Ronald Herbert Kennett | unopposed | | |
| Conservative win (new seat) | | | | |
| Conservative win (new seat) | | | | |

Corbar
| Party | Candidate | Votes | % | ±% |
|---|---|---|---|---|
| Conservative | Margaret Beatrice Millican | 679 | | |
| Conservative | Alan Keith Allman | 618 | | |
| Liberal | Evelyn Mary Briggs | 384 | | |
| Turnout | | | 48 | |
| Conservative win (new seat) | | | | |
| Conservative win (new seat) | | | | |

Cote Heath
| Party | Candidate | Votes | % | ±% |
|---|---|---|---|---|
| Labour | Terence Garrie Gill | 768 | | |
| Labour | William Barton Morley | 728 | | |
| Conservative | John Francis Charles Pontin | 329 | | |
| Conservative | Joyce Allwright | 325 | | |
| Turnout | | | 38.1 | |
| Labour win (new seat) | | | | |
| Labour win (new seat) | | | | |

Hayfield
| Party | Candidate | Votes | % | ±% |
|---|---|---|---|---|
| Conservative | Edmund Houghton | 735 | 79.89 | |
| Labour | Jacqueline Elizabeth Cowley | 185 | 20.11 | |
| Majority | | 550 | 59.78 | |
| Turnout | | 920 | 52.2 | |
| Conservative win (new seat) | | | | |

Ladybower
| Party | Candidate | Votes | % | ±% |
|---|---|---|---|---|
| Conservative | Constance Rita Bedford | unopposed | | |
| Conservative win (new seat) | | | | |

Limestone Peak
| Party | Candidate | Votes | % | ±% |
|---|---|---|---|---|
| Conservative | Evelyn May Tomlinson | 448 | 59.50 | |
| Independent | Ernest Thomas Walley | 305 | 40.50 | |
| Majority | | 143 | 18.99 | |
| Turnout | | 753 | 60.6 | |
| Conservative win (new seat) | | | | |

New Mills North
| Party | Candidate | Votes | % | ±% |
|---|---|---|---|---|
| Labour | P A Shaw | 732 | | |
| Independent | Frank Morris Bullough | 727 | | |
| Labour | J Axon | 825 | | |
| Liberal | Harry Norman Burfoot | 708 | | |
| Labour | J C Martin | 587 | | |
| Liberal | D Brown | 552 | | |
| Liberal | T Shepley | 499 | | |
| Turnout | | | 63.3 | |
| Labour win (new seat) | | | | |
| Independent win (new seat) | | | | |
| Labour win (new seat) | | | | |

New Mills South
| Party | Candidate | Votes | % | ±% |
|---|---|---|---|---|
| Conservative | Frederick Stanway Kitchen | 908 | | |
| Conservative | L T Townsend | 872 | | |
| Labour | W H Ferguson | 809 | | |
| Conservative | Dorothy May Livesley | 798 | | |
| Liberal | J R Lawton | 639 | | |
| Labour | F A Roberts | 627 | | |
| Labour | J H De Mierre | 598 | | |
| Liberal | E Lavin | 464 | | |
| Turnout | | | 69.9 | |
| Conservative win (new seat) | | | | |
| Conservative win (new seat) | | | | |
| Labour win (new seat) | | | | |

Peveril
| Party | Candidate | Votes | % | ±% |
|---|---|---|---|---|
| Conservative | Charles David Lewis | 548 | 59.82 | |
| Independent | Eric Marples | 246 | 26.86 | |
| Labour | James Powell | 122 | 13.32 | |
| Majority | | 302 | 32.97 | |
| Turnout | | 916 | 61.6 | |
| Conservative win (new seat) | | | | |

St. Andrew's / St. Charles' (Hadfield)
| Party | Candidate | Votes | % | ±% |
|---|---|---|---|---|
| Labour | William George Campbell | 1577 | | |
| Labour | Kenneth David Hoy | 1508 | | |
| Conservative | Garfield Julian Tomlinson Davies | 1361 | | |
| Conservative | Sheila Duncan | 1331 | | |
| Conservative | Denys Toole | 1326 | | |
| Conservative | Michael Jackson | 1319 | | |
| Labour | Peter Keelan | 1316 | | |
| Labour | Francis Walter Stubbs | 1305 | | |
| Labour | Eric Read | 1274 | | |
| Labour | James Stanley Byford | 1238 | | |
| Liberal | Ida Evelyn Walton | 1215 | | |
| Communist | Robert Ainsworth Heald | 221 | | |
| Turnout | | | 54.3 | |
| Labour win (new seat) | | | | |
| Labour win (new seat) | | | | |
| Conservative win (new seat) | | | | |
| Conservative win (new seat) | | | | |
| Conservative win (new seat) | | | | |
| Conservative win (new seat) | | | | |

St. James'
| Party | Candidate | Votes | % | ±% |
|---|---|---|---|---|
| Conservative | Ronald Partridge | 1063 | | |
| Conservative | Alfred Edwin Jenner Leney | 1005 | | |
| Liberal | Deryck Johnson | 994 | | |
| Conservative | Kenneth Guy Dickenson | 944 | | |
| Conservative | William Derek Dunn | 937 | | |
| Labour | Harold Edward Dunkerley | 690 | | |
| Labour | Lesley Ann Fowler | 573 | | |
| Turnout | | | 59.4 | |
| Conservative win (new seat) | | | | |
| Conservative win (new seat) | | | | |
| Liberal win (new seat) | | | | |
| Conservative win (new seat) | | | | |

St John's (Charlesworth)
| Party | Candidate | Votes | % | ±% |
|---|---|---|---|---|
| Conservative | Brenda Tetlow | 572 | 63.77 | |
| Liberal | Joyce Booth Bamforth | 238 | 26.53 | |
| Labour | David Walker Bowman | 87 | 9.70 | |
| Majority | | 334 | 37.24 | |
| Turnout | | 897 | 72.5 | |
| Conservative win (new seat) | | | | |

Stone Bench
| Party | Candidate | Votes | % | ±% |
|---|---|---|---|---|
| Labour | William Clifford Poulter | 943 | | |
| Labour | James Henry Poulton | 744 | | |
| Independent | Robin Mark Rogers | 234 | | |
| Turnout | | | 38.2 | |
| Labour win (new seat) | | | | |
| Labour win (new seat) | | | | |

Tintwistle
| Party | Candidate | Votes | % | ±% |
|---|---|---|---|---|
| Conservative | Thomas Henry Quayle | 453 | 63.00 | |
| Labour | Ralph Bennett | 266 | 37.00 | |
| Majority | | 187 | 26.00 | |
| Turnout | | 719 | 66.6 | |
| Conservative win (new seat) | | | | |

Whaley Bridge (Fernilee)
| Party | Candidate | Votes | % | ±% |
|---|---|---|---|---|
| Independent | Fredrick Bonsall Woodward | 364 | 63.30 | |
| Labour | Catherine Honor Harlow | 211 | 36.70 | |
| Majority | | 153 | 26.60 | |
| Turnout | | 575 | 54.8 | |
| Independent win (new seat) | | | | |

Whaley Bridge (Furness Vale)
| Party | Candidate | Votes | % | ±% |
|---|---|---|---|---|
| Independent | Harold Hastings Littlewood | 323 | 60.72 | |
| Labour | Margaret Stephen Tait Davies | 136 | 25.56 | |
| Independent | Clifford Mealor | 73 | 13.72 | |
| Majority | | 187 | 35.16 | |
| Turnout | | 532 | 60.5 | |
| Independent win (new seat) | | | | |

Whaley Bridge (Taxal)
| Party | Candidate | Votes | % | ±% |
|---|---|---|---|---|
| Independent | Roger Gilbert Hartley | 348 | 59.18 | |
| Labour | Edgar Winfield | 240 | 40.82 | |
| Majority | | 108 | 18.36 | |
| Turnout | | 588 | 64.9 | |
| Independent win (new seat) | | | | |

Whaley Bridge (Yeardsley)
| Party | Candidate | Votes | % | ±% |
|---|---|---|---|---|
| Conservative | Ralph Frederic Plumley | 235 | 29.34 | |
| Independent | John Arthur Thomas Pritchard | 194 | 24.22 | |
| Liberal | Constance Ann Smith | 190 | 23.72 | |
| Labour | George Kenneth Brown | 182 | 22.72 | |
| Majority | | 41 | 5.12 | |
| Turnout | | 801 | 64.1 | |
| Conservative win (new seat) | | | | |
