= 1983 High Peak Borough Council election =

1983 UK local government election

Elections to High Peak Borough Council in Derbyshire, England were held on 5 May 1983. All of the council was up for election and the council stayed under no overall control.

After the election, the composition of the council was:

- Conservative 18
- Labour 14
- SDP-Liberal Alliance 2
- Independent 10

== Election result ==
High Peak local election result 1983
| Party | Seats | Gains | Losses | Net gain/loss | Seats % | Votes % | Votes | +/− |
|---|---|---|---|---|---|---|---|---|
| Conservative | 18 | 2 | 6 | -4 | 40.91 | | | |
| Labour | 14 | 4 | 2 | +2 | 31.82 | | | |
| Alliance | 2 | 1 | 1 | | 4.55 | | | |
| Independent | 10 | 2 | 1 | +1 | 22.73 | | | |

== Ward results ==
All Saints
| Party | Candidate | Votes | % | ±% |
|---|---|---|---|---|
| Labour | Stephen Charles Cocks | 1272 | | |
| Independent | George Chatterton | 1220 | | |
| Labour | Frank Dyson Vaughan | 1019 | | |
| Conservative | Edwin Harold Mountain | 638 | | |
| Conservative | Michael Jackson | 593 | | |
| Turnout | | | | |
| Labour hold | | Swing | | |
| Independent hold | | Swing | | |
| Labour hold | | Swing | | |

Barmoor
| Party | Candidate | Votes | % | ±% |
|---|---|---|---|---|
| Conservative | Harold Henry Cartledge | 402 | 71.02 | |
| Labour | James Britt | 164 | 28.98 | |
| Majority | | 238 | 42.05 | |
| Turnout | | 566 | | |
| Conservative hold | | Swing | | |

Barms
| Party | Candidate | Votes | % | ±% |
|---|---|---|---|---|
| Independent | Alfred Henry Hitchings | 1142 | | |
| Labour | Barbara Mary Langham | 754 | | |
| Conservative | Michael Kenneth Diamond | 499 | | |
| Alliance | Ian Doxford Hedley | 341 | | |
| Turnout | | | | |
| Independent hold | | Swing | | |
| Labour hold | | Swing | | |

Blackbrook
| Party | Candidate | Votes | % | ±% |
|---|---|---|---|---|
| Independent | George Harry White | 827 | | |
| Conservative | Brian Colley | 615 | | |
| Conservative | Albert Peter Inglefield | 547 | | |
| Alliance | David John Oliver | 424 | | |
| Labour | Christopher Alan Birt | 247 | | |
| Turnout | | | | |
| Independent gain from Liberal | | Swing | | |
| Conservative hold | | Swing | | |

Buxton Central
| Party | Candidate | Votes | % | ±% |
|---|---|---|---|---|
| Conservative | Robert George Morris | 475 | 56.21 | |
| Alliance | Brenda Ann Bryant | 221 | 26.15 | |
| Labour | Stanley Burden | 149 | 17.63 | |
| Majority | | 254 | 30.06 | |
| Turnout | | 845 | | |
| Conservative hold | | Swing | | |

Chapel East
| Party | Candidate | Votes | % | ±% |
|---|---|---|---|---|
| Independent | Albert Phillips | 311 | 43.02 | |
| Independent | Stanley William Clives | 218 | 30.15 | |
| Labour | Brian Joseph Fisher | 194 | 26.83 | |
| Majority | | 93 | 12.86 | |
| Turnout | | 723 | | |
| Independent hold | | Swing | | |

Chapel West
| Party | Candidate | Votes | % | ±% |
|---|---|---|---|---|
| Independent | Muriel Bertha Bradbury | 629 | | |
| Conservative | Ann Stewart Young | 619 | | |
| Conservative | Kenneth Victor Bradwell | 505 | | |
| Labour | Peter Keith Jones | 381 | | |
| Alliance | Peter John Ashenden | 372 | | |
| Independent | Desmond Francis Bryan | 318 | | |
| Labour | Thomas Manion | 305 | | |
| Turnout | | | | |
| Independent gain from Conservative | | Swing | | |
| Conservative hold | | Swing | | |

College
| Party | Candidate | Votes | % | ±% |
|---|---|---|---|---|
| Conservative | Elizabeth Jane Inglefield | 805 | | |
| Conservative | Alan Keith Allman | 702 | | |
| Alliance | Winifred Nancie Adams | 562 | | |
| Alliance | Barbara Roseann Hedley | 519 | | |
| Labour | Gillian Taylor | 159 | | |
| Turnout | | | | |
| Conservative hold | | Swing | | |
| Conservative hold | | Swing | | |

Corbar
| Party | Candidate | Votes | % | ±% |
|---|---|---|---|---|
| Conservative | Margaret Beatrice Millican | 781 | | |
| Conservative | Peter De Leighton Brooke | 762 | | |
| Alliance | Josephine Cresswell | 460 | | |
| Labour | Michael Pearson-Smith | 380 | | |
| Turnout | | | | |
| Conservative hold | | Swing | | |
| Conservative hold | | Swing | | |

Cote Heath
| Party | Candidate | Votes | % | ±% |
|---|---|---|---|---|
| Alliance | Michael Robert Leslie Loader | 752 | | |
| Labour | Noel Ratcliffe | 728 | | |
| Labour | Jane Ann McGrother | 617 | | |
| Conservative | Joan Mary Chape | 616 | | |
| Alliance | Alan Hall | 501 | | |
| Turnout | | | | |
| Alliance gain from Labour | | Swing | | |
| Labour hold | | Swing | | |

Gamesley
| Party | Candidate | Votes | % | ±% |
|---|---|---|---|---|
| Labour | John Francis | 967 | | |
| Labour | Richard John Cooke | 863 | | |
| Conservative | James Wildgoose | 211 | | |
| Alliance | Judith Mary Marquand | 162 | | |
| Turnout | | | | |
| Labour hold | | Swing | | |
| Labour hold | | Swing | | |

Hayfield
| Party | Candidate | Votes | % | ±% |
|---|---|---|---|---|
| Conservative | Herbert David Mellor | 635 | 64.14 | |
| Labour | John Anthony Bull | 355 | 35.86 | |
| Majority | | 280 | 28.28 | |
| Turnout | | 990 | | |
| Conservative gain from Independent | | Swing | | |

Ladybower
| Party | Candidate | Votes | % | ±% |
|---|---|---|---|---|
| Conservative | George Albert Bingham | 543 | 81.65 | |
| Independent | James Cusick | 122 | 18.35 | |
| Majority | | 421 | 63.31 | |
| Turnout | | 665 | | |
| Conservative hold | | Swing | | |

Limestone Peak
| Party | Candidate | Votes | % | ±% |
|---|---|---|---|---|
| Independent | Evelyn May Tomlinson | 568 | 81.03 | |
| Labour | Gregory Francis Monks | 133 | 18.97 | |
| Majority | | 435 | 62.05 | |
| Turnout | | 701 | | |
| Independent hold | | Swing | | |

New Mills North
| Party | Candidate | Votes | % | ±% |
|---|---|---|---|---|
| Conservative | Dorothy Mary Livesley | 983 | | |
| Conservative | Dorothy May Brennand | 978 | | |
| Labour | Martin Huddleston | 946 | | |
| Alliance | Roy Bickerton | 940 | | |
| Labour | Lawrence Gordon Allen | 914 | | |
| Labour | John Graham Eary | 868 | | |
| Turnout | | | | |
| Conservative hold | | Swing | | |
| Conservative hold | | Swing | | |
| Labour gain from Conservative | | Swing | | |

New Mills South
| Party | Candidate | Votes | % | ±% |
|---|---|---|---|---|
| Alliance | Harry Norman Burfoot | 801 | | |
| Labour | John James Fernley | 766 | | |
| Labour | Marion Williams | 762 | | |
| Conservative | William Robinson | 475 | | |
| Conservative | Ronald Ferguson | 330 | | |
| Turnout | | | | |
| Alliance hold | | Swing | | |
| Labour gain from Conservative | | Swing | | |

Peveril
| Party | Candidate | Votes | % | ±% |
|---|---|---|---|---|
| Independent | Charles David Lewis | 705 | 70.93 | |
| Alliance | Angela Helen Kellie | 186 | 18.71 | |
| Labour | James Powell | 103 | 10.36 | |
| Majority | | 519 | 52.21 | |
| Turnout | | 994 | | |
| Independent hold | | Swing | | |

St. Andrew's
| Party | Candidate | Votes | % | ±% |
|---|---|---|---|---|
| Labour | Mary Kathleen Holtom | 824 | | |
| Labour | John Hallsworth | 715 | | |
| Conservative | David Wilson | 621 | | |
| Conservative | Thomas Farnsworth | 566 | | |
| Alliance | Christopher Thomas O’Brien | 318 | | |
| Turnout | | | | |
| Labour gain from Conservative | | Swing | | |
| Labour gain from Conservative | | Swing | | |

St. Charles'
| Party | Candidate | Votes | % | ±% |
|---|---|---|---|---|
| Labour | David Holtom | 907 | | |
| Labour | Francis Walter Stubbs | 799 | | |
| Conservative | William John Wood | 522 | | |
| Conservative | Cynthia Violet Mitchell | 470 | | |
| Alliance | Trevor Jones Randall | 276 | | |
| Turnout | | | | |
| Labour hold | | Swing | | |
| Labour hold | | Swing | | |

St. James'
| Party | Candidate | Votes | % | ±% |
|---|---|---|---|---|
| Conservative | Alfred Edwin Jenner Leney | 924 | | |
| Conservative | Leslie Ernest Proctor | 847 | | |
| Conservative | Susan Jane Von Achten | 833 | | |
| Labour | Christopher Sydney Turner | 766 | | |
| Labour | Amy Wood | 682 | | |
| Labour | Arthur Harrison Gilbert | 631 | | |
| Alliance | Christopher Mellor | 579 | | |
| Alliance | Robert Michael Love | 502 | | |
| Turnout | | | | |
| Conservative hold | | Swing | | |
| Conservative hold | | Swing | | |
| Conservative hold | | Swing | | |

St John's
| Party | Candidate | Votes | % | ±% |
|---|---|---|---|---|
| Conservative | Brenda Tetlow | 780 | 80.25 | |
| Labour | Peter John William Holland | 192 | 19.75 | |
| Majority | | 588 | 60.49 | |
| Turnout | | 972 | | |
| Conservative hold | | Swing | | |

Simmondley
| Party | Candidate | Votes | % | ±% |
|---|---|---|---|---|
| Conservative | John Percy Phipps | 522 | 51.94 | |
| Labour | John Alfred Pagett | 250 | 24.88 | |
| Independent | Joyce Ashley | 233 | 23.18 | |
| Majority | | 272 | 27.06 | |
| Turnout | | 1005 | | |
| Conservative hold | | Swing | | |

Stone Bench
| Party | Candidate | Votes | % | ±% |
|---|---|---|---|---|
| Labour | James Henry Poulton | 898 | | |
| Labour | Raymond Vernon Browne | 837 | | |
| Alliance | Robert Keith Taylor | 369 | | |
| Conservative | Arnold Bennett | 340 | | |
| Conservative | David Pearson | 289 | | |
| Turnout | | | | |
| Labour hold | | Swing | | |
| Labour hold | | Swing | | |

Tintwistle
| Party | Candidate | Votes | % | ±% |
|---|---|---|---|---|
| Conservative | Wright Brownhill Cooper | 477 | 61.63 | |
| Labour | Douglas Carr | 297 | 38.37 | |
| Majority | | 180 | 23.26 | |
| Turnout | | 774 | | |
| Conservative gain from Labour | | Swing | | |

Whaley Bridge
| Party | Candidate | Votes | % | ±% |
|---|---|---|---|---|
| Independent | Jean Elizabeth Hallam | 2108 | | |
| Independent | John Arthur Thomas Pritchard | 1208 | | |
| Independent | Fredrick Bonsall Woodward | 1111 | | |
| Conservative | Harold Hastings Littlewood | 711 | | |
| Conservative | James Gordon Pollitt | 619 | | |
| Alliance | Christopher Richard Warhurst Weaver | 550 | | |
| Labour | Valerie Mason | 423 | | |
| Alliance | Paula Marguerite Butler | 398 | | |
| Labour | Philip John Taylor | 231 | | |
| Labour | Roger Wilkinson | 214 | | |
| Turnout | | | | |
| Independent hold | | Swing | | |
| Independent hold | | Swing | | |
| Independent gain from Conservative | | Swing | | |
