= 1995 High Peak Borough Council election =

1995 UK local government election

Elections to High Peak Borough Council in Derbyshire, England were held on 4 May 1995. All of the council was up for election and the Labour Party took control of the council from no overall control.

After the election, the composition of the council was:

- Labour 30
- Conservative 5
- Liberal Democrat 5
- Independent 4

== Election result ==
High Peak local election result 1995
Party	Seats	Gains	Losses	Net gain/loss	Seats %	Votes %	Votes	+/−
Labour	30	14	0	+14	69.7			
Conservative	5	0	9	-9	11.6			
Liberal Democrats	5	0	5	-5	11.6			
Independent	4	0	0	0	9.1			

== Ward results ==
All Saints
Party	Candidate	Votes	%	±%
Labour	David Bond	1364		
Labour	Roger Wilkinson	1357		
Labour	Richard Rowbotham	1316		
Liberal Democrats	Anne Shaw	712		
Liberal Democrats	Rhona Griffiths	586		
Liberal Democrats	Goinden Kuppan	536		
Turnout			43.08	
Labour hold		Swing		
Labour hold		Swing		
Labour hold		Swing		

Barmoor
Party	Candidate	Votes	%	±%
Independent	Brian Millward	230	51.57	
Labour	Robert Adderley	142	31.84	
Liberal Democrats	Robert William Wilkinson	74	16.59	
Majority		88	19.73	
Turnout		446	42.61	
Independent hold		Swing		

Barms
Party	Candidate	Votes	%	±%
Labour	Ann Mone	838		
Labour	Andrew Uprichard	644		
Conservative	Robin Basil Baldry	285		
Turnout			40.40	
Labour hold		Swing		
Labour hold		Swing		

Blackbrook
Party	Candidate	Votes	%	±%
Liberal Democrats	Peter John Ashenden	781		
Liberal Democrats	Dorothy Challand	717		
Conservative	Donald Gifford Crow	386		
Labour	Martin Thomas James Bisknell	317		
Turnout			48.19	
Liberal Democrats hold		Swing		
Liberal Democrats hold		Swing		

Buxton Central
Party	Candidate	Votes	%	±%
Labour	Jane Anne McGrother	315	46.87	
Conservative	Jacqueline Elizabeth Corrigan	206	30.65	
Liberal Democrats	Michael Francis Bryant	151	22.47	
Turnout		672	46.42	
Majority		109	16.22	
Labour gain from Conservative		Swing		

Chapel East
Party	Candidate	Votes	%	±%
Liberal Democrats	James Edward George Boote	407	63.69	
Labour	Kevin Hewitt	232	40.9	
Majority		175	27.39	
Turnout		639	42.54	
Liberal Democrats hold		Swing		

Chapel West
Party	Candidate	Votes	%	±%
Labour	Carole Elizabeth Cobb	543		
Independent	Frank Peter Harrison	498		
Liberal Democrats	Anthony Joseph Mulhern	496		
Conservative	Ann Stewart Young	480		
Independent	Muriel Bertha Bradbury	401		
Turnout			41.23	
Labour gain from Conservative		Swing		
Independent gain from Independent		Swing		

College
Party	Candidate	Votes	%	±%
Conservative	Margaret Mary Williams	719		
Conservative	Terence Michael Corrigan	673		
Labour	Helen Jane White	627		
Turnout			49.92	
Conservative hold		Swing		
Conservative hold		Swing		

Corbar
Party	Candidate	Votes	%	±%
Labour	Ian David Watts	512		
Conservative	Margaret Beatrice Millican	483		
Conservative	Clive John Beattie	482		
Turnout				
Labour gain from Conservative		Swing		
Conservative hold		Swing		

Cote Heath
Party	Candidate	Votes	%	±%
Labour	Philip Mone	772		
Labour	Keith Edward Savage	690		
Liberal Democrats	Michael Robert Leslie Loader	400		
Liberal Democrats	Peter Campbell Newsam	303		
Conservative	Gillian Gwen Faulkner	240		
Turnout			41.95	
Labour gain from Liberal Democrats		Swing		
Labour gain from Liberal Democrats		Swing		

Gamesley
Party	Candidate	Votes	%	±%
Labour	John Francis	unopposed		
Labour	Richard John Cooke	unopposed		
Labour hold		Swing		
Labour hold		Swing		

Hayfield
Party	Candidate	Votes	%	±%
Independent	Herbert David Mellor	484	53.60	
Labour	Alison Mary Teresa Noone	419	46.40	
Majority		65	7.20	
Turnout		903	44.37	
Independent gain from Conservative		Swing		

Ladybower
Party	Candidate	Votes	%	±%
Labour	Ian Wingfield	369	54.18	
Conservative	Virginia Patricia Montagu Priestley	312	45.82	
Majority		57	8.37	
Turnout		681	55.25	
Labour gain from Conservative		Swing		

Limestone Peak
Party	Candidate	Votes	%	±%
Labour	Peter Redfern	233	38.52	
Liberal Democrats	Joyce Allwright	190	31.40	
Conservative	Derek Walter Udale	182	30.08	
Majority		43	7.11	
Turnout		605	48.4	
Labour gain from Independent		Swing		

New Mills North
Party	Candidate	Votes	%	±%
Labour	Angela Alison Shaw	1121		
Labour	Liam Bernard Mycroft	1110		
Liberal Democrats	Roy Bickerton	825		
Liberal Democrats	David Lawrence Burfoot	616		
Conservative	Christopher Barnes	513		
Conservative	Angela Barbara Hampton	392		
Liberal Democrats	Alan Michael Fieldsend	386		
Conservative	Christopher John Saunders	381		
Independent	Mark John Ireland	377		
Turnout			54.20	
Labour gain from Conservative		Swing		
Labour gain from Conservative		Swing		
Liberal Democrats hold		Swing		

New Mills South
Party	Candidate	Votes	%	±%
Labour	Marion Williams	888		
Labour	William Russell Dunn	823		
Liberal Democrats	Harry Norman Burfoot	587		
Liberal Democrats	Stephen John Herbert Dearden	433		
Conservative	Helen Marion Wallis	123		
Turnout			49.58	
Labour gain from Liberal Democrats		Swing		
Labour gain from Liberal Democrats		Swing		

Peveril
Party	Candidate	Votes	%	±%
Conservative	Ronald Ernest Priestley	469	51.77	
Labour	Terence Ernest Skelton	307	33.88	
Liberal Democrats	Jane Margaret Simm	130	14.35	
Majority		162	17.88	
Turnout		906	55.19	
Conservative hold		Swing		

St. Andrew's
Party	Candidate	Votes	%	±%
Labour	John Hallsworth	791		
Labour	Norman Patrick Garlick	780		
Liberal Democrats	Ian Gregory	189		
Turnout			35.41	
Labour hold		Swing		
Labour hold		Swing		

St. Charles'
Party	Candidate	Votes	%	±%
Labour	Mary Kathleen Holtom	870		
Labour	Gwyneth Mary Francis	771		
Conservative	Olive MacKay	236		
Liberal Democrats	Peter John Michael William Beard	189		
Turnout			37.60	
Labour hold		Swing		
Labour hold		Swing		

St. James'
Party	Candidate	Votes	%	±%
Labour	Sylvia Jane Green	1077		
Labour	Arthur Harrison Gilbert	1074		
Labour	Jacqueline Margaret Wilkinson	1050		
Conservative	Anne Ross Worrall	386		
Liberal Democrats	James William Angus	350		
Turnout			39.39	
Labour hold		Swing		
Labour hold		Swing		
Labour gain from Conservative		Swing		

St John's
Party	Candidate	Votes	%	±%
Conservative	Brenda Tetlow	332	39.10	
Labour	Frank Nelson Poynter	284	33.45	
Liberal Democrats	Christopher Frank Harbut	233	27.44	
Majority		48	5.65	
Turnout		849	44.98	
Conservative hold		Swing		

Simmondley
Party	Candidate	Votes	%	±%
Labour	Graham Oakley	456	47.85	
Liberal Democrats	Nicholas Michael Cotter	279	29.27	
Conservative	Peter Jeffrey Sidebottom	218	22.88	
Majority		177	18.57	
Turnout		953	43.86	
Labour gain from Conservative		Swing		

Stone Bench
Party	Candidate	Votes	%	±%
Labour	Raymond Vernon Browne	880		
Labour	James Henry Poulton	865		
Conservative	Richard Jeffrey Mayson	103		
Turnout			39.60	
Labour hold		Swing		
Labour hold		Swing		

Tintwistle
Party	Candidate	Votes	%	±%
Labour	Joyce Brocklehurst	341	60.89	
Conservative	William Clarke	219	39.11	
Majority		122	21.78	
Turnout		560	53.22	
Labour hold		Swing		

Whaley Bridge
Party	Candidate	Votes	%	±%
Labour	Henry Leigh Playford	1134		
Independent	John Arthur Thomas Pritchard	1088		
Liberal Democrats	David William Lomax	1070		
Independent	Anthony Eccles	888		
Liberal Democrats	James Gordon Pollitt	804		
Conservative	Mark David Healey	348		
Independent	William Henry Barratt	337		
Turnout			49.70	
Labour gain from Liberal Democrats		Swing		
Independent hold		Swing		
Liberal Democrats hold		Swing		
