= 1976 High Peak Borough Council election =

1976 UK local government election

Elections to High Peak Borough Council in Derbyshire, England were held in 1976. All of the council was up for election and the control of the council changed from no overall control to Conservative control.

After the election, the composition of the council was:

- Conservative 27
- Labour 8
- Liberal 2
- Independent 9

== Election result ==
High Peak local election result 1976
Party	Seats	Gains	Losses	Net gain/loss	Seats %	Votes %	Votes	+/−
Conservative	27	8	4	+4	58.7	45.3		
Labour	8	1	5	-4	17.4	27.3		
Liberal	2	1	1	0	4.4	6.7		
Independent	9	4	4	0	19.6	20.7		
Green	0	0	0	0	0			
Communist	0	0	0	0	0			

== Ward results ==
All Saints
Party	Candidate	Votes	%	±%
Independent	George Chatterton	980		
Conservative	Edwin Harold Mountain	689		
Conservative	Irene Beatrice Greenhalgh	593		
Conservative	George Wharmby	578		
Independent	Peter Matthews	572		
Labour	Stephen Charles Cocks	430		
Labour	Kenneth Esplin Bracewell	410		
Labour	Ms L Whitson	380		
Independent	P Durkin	355		
Green	Geoffrey Thomas Machan	186		
Liberal	Ms G Mitchell	166		
Turnout			50.3	
Independent hold		Swing		
Conservative gain from Independent		Swing		
Conservative hold		Swing		

Barmoor
Party	Candidate	Votes	%	±%
Independent	Oswald Milner	325	53.8	
Conservative	W Hutchinson	279	46.2	
Turnout			58.7	
Majority		46		
Independent hold		Swing		

Barms
Party	Candidate	Votes	%	±%
Labour	Alfred Henry Hitchings	828		
Conservative	R Milburn	615		
Labour	C Ward	543		
Conservative	Ms E Bradbury	514		
Turnout			55.2	
Labour hold		Swing		
Conservative gain from Labour		Swing		

Blackbrook
Party	Candidate	Votes	%	±%
Conservative	Betty Patricia Colley	unopposed		
Liberal	George Harry White	unopposed		
Conservative gain from Independent		Swing		
Liberal hold		Swing		

Buxton Central
Party	Candidate	Votes	%	±%
Conservative	Dennis Raymond Walter	521	68.1	
Labour	G Ellis	244	31.9	
Turnout			55.9	
Majority		277	36.2	
Conservative hold		Swing		

Chapel East
Party	Candidate	Votes	%	±%
Independent	Albert Phillips	475	63.5	
Conservative	D Eva	219	29.3	
Labour	K Jones	54	7.2	
Majority		256	34.2	
Turnout			56.7	
Independent hold		Swing		

Chapel West
Party	Candidate	Votes	%	±%
Conservative	Muriel Bertha Bradbury	829		
Conservative	Kenneth Victor Bradwell	666		
Labour	Melvyn Wright	430		
Independent	H Ellison	428		
Labour	T Bennett	323		
Turnout			52.3	
Conservative hold		Swing		
Conservative hold		Swing		

College
Party	Candidate	Votes	%	±%
Conservative	Joyce Mary Craufurd-Stuart	838		
Conservative	Elizabeth Jane Allen	689		
Green	Ms J Allen	457		
Turnout			45.0	
Conservative hold		Swing		
Conservative hold		Swing		

Corbar
Party	Candidate	Votes	%	±%
Conservative	Margaret Beatrice Millican	818		
Conservative	Alan Keith Allman	707		
Labour	B Rosier	253		
Turnout			43.6	
Conservative hold		Swing		
Conservative hold		Swing		

Cote Heath
Party	Candidate	Votes	%	±%
Independent	Terence Garrie Gill	903		
Labour	B Halliday	550		
Conservative	Iris Tamsons	502		
Conservative	Joyce Allwright	422		
Labour	J Wilson	422		
Turnout			51.8	
Independent gain from Labour		Swing		
Labour hold		Swing		

Hayfield
Party	Candidate	Votes	%	±%
Independent	Fred Barnes	402	42.2	
Conservative	G Cooper	401	42.1	
Labour	I Bennett	150	15.7	
Majority		1	0.1	
Turnout			53.6	
Independent gain from Conservative		Swing		

Ladybower
Party	Candidate	Votes	%	±%
Conservative	Sam Wanamaker	499	70.6	
Labour	James Stanley Byford	208	29.4	
Majority		291	41.2	
Turnout			61.2	
Conservative hold		Swing		

Limestone Peak
Party	Candidate	Votes	%	±%
Conservative	Evelyn May Tomlinson	420	64.7	
Independent	Ernest Thomas Walley	229	35.3	
Majority		191	29.4	
Turnout			50.0	
Conservative hold		Swing		

New Mills North
Party	Candidate	Votes	%	±%
Conservative	L Townsend	1016		
Conservative	Dorothy Mary Livesley	916		
Conservative	Betty Colley	834		
Labour	W Ferguson	711		
Liberal	C Weaver	648		
Labour	J Demierre	454		
Labour	Ms D Fryman	396		
Turnout			50.6	
Conservative gain from Labour		Swing		
Conservative gain from Independent		Swing		
Conservative gain from Labour		Swing		

New Mills South
Party	Candidate	Votes	%	±%
Liberal	D Brown	749		
Conservative	John Keith McMurray	718		
Independent	Frank Morris Bullough	707		
Labour	J Axon	554		
Labour	Ms M Williams	425		
Turnout			50.2	
Liberal gain from Conservative		Swing		
Conservative hold		Swing		
Independent gain from Labour		Swing		

Peveril
Party	Candidate	Votes	%	±%
Conservative	Charles David Lewis	788	83.5	
Labour	Ms Moira Monteith	156	16.5	
Majority		632	66.9	
Turnout			63.8	
Conservative hold		Swing		

St. Andrew's / St. Charles' (Hadfield)
Party	Candidate	Votes	%	±%
Labour	David Holtom	1946		
Labour	R Cooke	1847		
Conservative	Michael Jackson	1845		
Labour	Francis Walter Stubbs	1835		
Conservative	D Dunn	1795		
Conservative	D Wilson	1780		
Conservative	Denys Toole	1774		
Conservative	A Stevenson	1731		
Conservative	M Ross	1717		
Labour	K Powell	1691		
Labour	S Lomas	1671		
Communist	Robert Ainsworth Heald	306		
Turnout			47.7	
Labour hold		Swing		
Labour hold		Swing		
Conservative hold		Swing		
Labour gain from Conservative		Swing		
Labour gain from Conservative		Swing		
Conservative hold		Swing		

St. James'
Party	Candidate	Votes	%	±%
Conservative	Alfred Edwin Jenner Leney	1547		
Conservative	Ronald Partridge	1502		
Conservative	Kenneth Guy Dickenson	1441		
Conservative	Ms A Mellor	1296		
Labour	Reginald Mann	659		
Liberal	Deryck Johnson	654		
Labour	Ms C Ashton	629		
Labour	D Carr	616		
Labour	A Pomfret	535		
Turnout			48.3	
Conservative hold		Swing		
Conservative hold		Swing		
Conservative gain from Liberal		Swing		
Conservative hold		Swing		

St John's (Charlesworth)
Party	Candidate	Votes	%	±%
Conservative	Brenda Tetlow	800	89.0	
Labour	P Keelan	99	11.0	
Majority		701	78.0	
Turnout			70.1	
Conservative hold		Swing		

Stone Bench
Party	Candidate	Votes	%	±%
Labour	William Barton Morley	850		
Labour	James Henry Poulton	717		
Conservative	G McIlvenny	621		
Turnout			42.6	
Labour hold		Swing		
Labour hold		Swing		

Tintwistle
Party	Candidate	Votes	%	±%
Conservative	Clifford Pennington	445	61.1	
Labour	David Wilcox	283	38.9	
Majority		162	22.3	
Turnout			67.1	
Conservative hold		Swing		

Whaley Bridge (Fernilee)
Party	Candidate	Votes	%	±%
Independent	Fredrick Bonsall Woodward	506	80.1	
Labour	J Conway	126	19.9	
Majority		380	60.1	
Turnout			60.6	
Independent hold		Swing		

Whaley Bridge (Furness Vale)
Party	Candidate	Votes	%	±%
Independent	Harold Hastings Littlewood	414	70.4	
Labour	Ms V Mason	174	29.6	
Majority		240	40.8	
Turnout			66.5	
Independent hold		Swing		

Whaley Bridge (Taxal)
Party	Candidate	Votes	%	±%
Conservative	Roger Gilbert Hartley	287	52.7	
Independent	F Hartley	137	25.1	
Labour	B Ludden	121	22.2	
Majority		150	27.5	
Turnout			63.0	
Conservative gain from Independent		Swing		

Whaley Bridge (Yeardsley)
Party	Candidate	Votes	%	±%
Independent	John Arthur Thomas Pritchard	391	41.6	
Conservative	G Ralston	325	34.5	
Labour	Ms C Jones	225	23.9	
Majority		66	7.0	
Turnout			70.1	
Independent gain from Conservative		Swing		
