= David Bookbinder =

British politician (1940/41 – 2023)

Leader of Derbyshire County Council
- In office 1981–1992
- Succeeded by: Martin Doughty

Member of Derbyshire County Council for Litchurch
- In office 7 June 1973 – July 1993

Personal details
- Born: c. 1940/1941 Manchester, England
- Died: 24 December 2023 (aged 82–83)
- Party: Labour
- Spouses: Mary (died 1994); Wang Yi (m. 2009)

David Bookbinder (1940/41 – 24 December 2023) was a British Labour Party politician. He was elected to Derbyshire County Council in 1973 and became council leader in 1981. Bookbinder's administration saw the banning of school corporal punishment and the implementation of cheaper school meals. He was frequently opposed to the policies of Conservative prime minister Margaret Thatcher, in particular over a government request that Derbyshire end its twinning agreement with Shanxi province, China, following the June 1989 Tiananmen Square massacre. Thatcher called him, at the time, her "least favourite local government leader". Bookbinder stood down from his position as leader in April 1992 after his wife developed breast cancer and from the council in July 1993. In retirement he was chair of an investment company.

== Early life ==
Bookbinder was born in Manchester in 1940 or 1941. He joined the Labour Party at the age of 15.

== Derbyshire County Council ==
Bookbinder was elected a county councillor for the Litchurch division of Derby in 1973 and defended the seat in the 1977, 1981, 1985 and 1989 elections, with a majority of at least 22% in each case. During the 1975 United Kingdom European Communities membership referendum campaign Bookbinder spoke against membership of the European Communities, concerned that value-added tax would be imposed on food in the UK.

Bookbinder became leader of the council in 1981 and also sat on its policy committee and the investment panel. During his time in office he helped to bring in cheaper school meals (from 45p per week) and free home care. His administration also banned school corporal punishment (he considered this the most important act he achieved in office) and the use of live animals in travelling circuses in the county.

Bookbinder also forced the removal of Derbyshire Police's Chief Constable Alf Parrish who was, in 1984, facing accusations of misuse of public funds over an executive bathroom installed at the police headquarters. Bookbinder played a key role in attracting Toyota Manufacturing UK to establish their first UK factory at Burnaston, Derbyshire. The decision was taken in 1989 and the first car was produced in 1992. The local Conservative MP Edwina Currie said "Toyota would not have arrived in Derbyshire and in my constituency without David Bookbinder".

Bookbinder found himself frequently in opposition to the Conservative government of Margaret Thatcher (prime minister 1979–1990). Bookbinder opposed Thatcher's policy on public spending cuts, privatisation, the 1984–1985 miners' strike and the poll tax.

Following the June 1989 Tiananmen Square massacre in Beijing, Thatcher sought to reduce ties with China. She directed Bookbinder to cancel a twinning agreement between Derbyshire and Shanxi province. Bookbinder refused to do so, insisting that the government had no legal basis to enforce the decision and that doing so would require 12 students on an exchange programme to return to China. The twinning agreement remained in place. Bookbinder continued to press for better relations between Britain and China. It was the biggest disagreement between him and Thatcher. Thatcher at the time called Bookbinder her "least favourite local government leader". On her 2013 death Bookbinder acknowledged that he respected her "great strength and determination" but "apart from that, I disagreed with everything she's ever done".

Bookbinder won significant damages in a High Court case for libel against the Sunday Times who had, in September 1989, accused him of having "corrupt relations" with media tycoon Owen Oyston. Bookbinder resigned as leader in April 1992 after his wife, Mary, was diagnosed with breast cancer. He stood down as councillor in July 1993 and Mary died the following year.

== Other interests ==
Bookbinder stood as candidate for parliament in the High Peak constituency at the October 1974 and 1979 general elections and in the Amber Valley constituency at the 1983 and 1987 general elections. He came second to the Conservative candidate (Spencer Le Marchant and Phillip Oppenheim respectively) each time. After retiring from the council Bookbinder was chairman of Derbyshire First Investments, a company that invested in businesses in the county.

Bookbinder became disillusioned with New Labour under prime minister Tony Blair, largely because of the latter's support for the 2003 invasion of Iraq. He came to regard the party as "the lesser of all evils". He opposed the Conservative–Liberal Democrat coalition government's introduction, from 2012, of police and crime commissioners to take on the role of overseeing police forces from the local police authorities.

Bookbinder was a supporter of Manchester City FC. He underwent heart bypass surgery in 2000 and later suffered from bladder cancer for which he had chemotherapy but also used Chinese traditional medicine. He remarried in 2009 to Chinese-born Wang Yi. Bookbinder died on Christmas Eve 2023.
