= Tom Levitt =

British politician

Member of Parliament for High Peak
- In office 1 May 1997 – 12 April 2010
- Preceded by: Charles Hendry
- Succeeded by: Andrew Bingham

Personal details
- Born: 10 April 1954 (age 72) Crewe, Cheshire, England
- Party: Labour (until 2019)
- Spouse: Teresa Levitt
- Education: Lancaster University
- Profession: Teacher

Tom Levitt (born 10 April 1954) is a former British Labour Party politician who was the Member of Parliament (MP) for High Peak from the 1997 to 2010 general elections.

== Early life ==
Born in Crewe in 1954, Levitt was raised in Leek, Staffordshire. He was one of the first male intakes when a girls' grammar school, Westwood High, became a comprehensive school. He is a biology graduate of Lancaster University and has a teaching qualification from Oxford University.

== Early career ==
Levitt taught in comprehensive schools and in further education. He is the author of a textbook on intertidal ecology.

As a consultant on disabled access to services and information (1993–97), Levitt wrote three books: Sound Policies, Sound Practice and Clear Access. These deal with the way local authorities provide services for people with hearing and visual impairments. Levitt also worked as a successful Deaf Awareness trainer.

== Political career ==
After unsuccessfully contesting Stroud in the 1987 general election and High Peak in 1992, Levitt was first elected to the House of Commons for the latter seat at the 1997 general election. He had 14 years' service at all levels of local government, including Derbyshire County Council, where he was for a year a vice chair of Education, and had stood unsuccessfully for The Cotswolds at the 1989 European Parliament elections. He was also a member of the management committee of High Peak Citizens Advice Bureau. As one of the few MPs with a qualification in British Sign Language, Levitt was an elected Trustee of the Royal National Institute for Deaf People (RNID) from 1998 to 2003. Levitt was the first MP to use BSL in the House of Commons. He chaired the Community Development Foundation from 2004 to 2010.

From 1997 to 2003, Levitt was on the Standards & Privileges Committee, responsible for monitoring standards of MPs' professional conduct. In 2004 he sat on the Scrutiny Committee for the Draft Disability Bill.

Following his election he held several junior positions. He was Parliamentary Private Secretary to Barbara Roche MP (1999–2003), first in the Home Office and then in the Office of the Deputy Prime Minister. Following this he was the Parliamentary Private Secretary to Hilary Benn, the Secretary of State for International Development, from 2003 to 2007. He was a member of the Work and Pensions Committee from 2007 and assistant to the Regional Minister for the East Midlands.

Levitt is known to be in favour of the Longdendale Bypass, which would run through the north of his former constituency. In November 2009, Levitt told the Labour Party that he would not be a candidate at the 2010 general election.

Levitt resigned his membership of the Labour Party in April 2019, describing the leadership of Jeremy Corbyn as "incompetent, hypocritical and profoundly wrong on key issues". He subsequently declared his support for and involvement in Change UK – The Independent Group.

=== Expenses ===
During the furore over MPs' expenses in 2009, it was revealed Levitt had submitted a £16.50 claim in 2006 for a memorial wreath. He said the claim had been submitted by accident by a member of staff and that the claim had been rejected.

Levitt spent £8,013 on a new bathroom in his London flat; however, only £6,335 of this was paid because he had exceeded the maximum spend. This was in addition to an initial claim of £5,281 for renovation work on his London flat. Levitt has said that he believed he had been 'moderate' in his claims for accommodation in London.

In 2007, it had been revealed that Levitt had, of all MPs, claimed the eighth highest total expenses—£168,660 in 2006–2007, an increase of £29,103 on the previous year. Despite the adverse reaction in the local press, in following years Levitt's expenses remained at the same level, with £164,620 claimed in 2007–2008, and £168,318 claimed in 2008–2009.

== Business interests ==
In 2010 Levitt set up Sector4Focus, a consultancy which promotes relationships between the private, public and charitable sectors.

He has also written two books on similar subjects, Welcome to Good Co and in 2018, the Company Citizen about which former Unilever CEO Paul Polman said ‘Never has the case for business to step up and help solve society’s challenges been greater. And rarely has it been better put than in this excellent account’.

In 2015 he helped found the anti-poverty social enterprise, Fair for You, and has held various other charity trusteeships and non-executive roles in social enterprises.

== Personal life ==
Levitt lived in Buxton from 1991 to 2011 and now lives in west London. He is the author of two plays, Making Allowances (2010) and PowerPlay (2018).

Parliament of the United Kingdom
Preceded by Charles Hendry	Member of Parliament for High Peak; 1997–2010	Succeeded by Andrew Bingham
