= Jon Pearce =

British politician

Jon Pearce MP
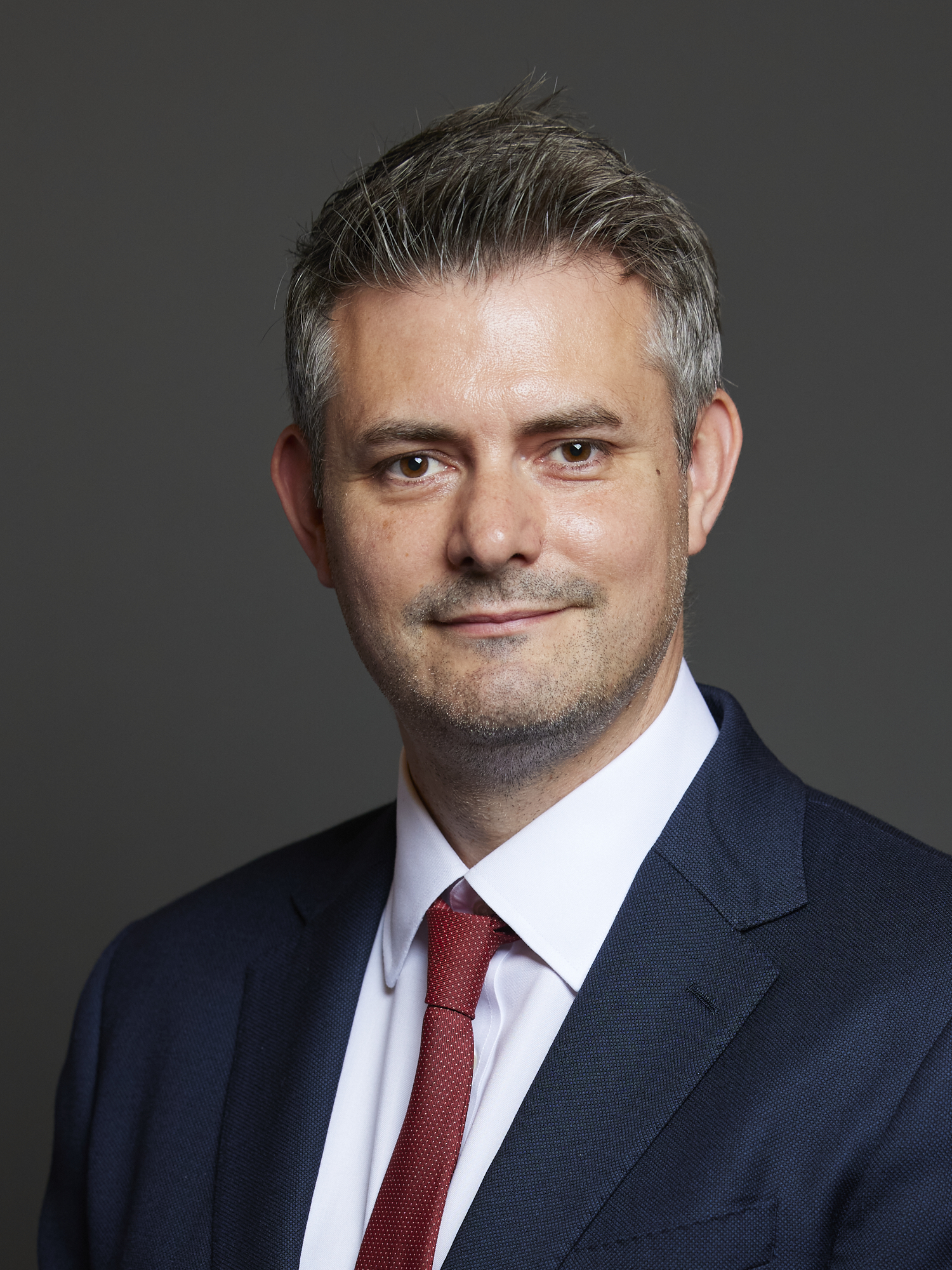
- Official portrait, 2024

Parliamentary Private Secretary to the Prime Minister
- In office 11 September 2025 – 20 July 2026 Serving with Abena Oppong-Asare and Catherine Fookes
- Prime Minister: Keir Starmer
- Preceded by: Chris Ward; Liz Twist
- Succeeded by: David Baines; Jo Platt; Nic Dakin

Member of Parliament for High Peak
- Incumbent
- Assumed office 4 July 2024
- Preceded by: Robert Largan
- Majority: 7,908 (16.1%)

Personal details
- Born: 29 July 1977 (age 49) Derbyshire, England
- Party: Labour
- Education: Newcastle University
- Website: www.jon4highpeak.com

Jonathan Pearce (born 29 July 1977) is a British Labour Party politician who has been Member of Parliament (MP) for High Peak, in Derbyshire, since the 2024 general election, in which he defeated incumbent Conservative MP Robert Largan.

== Early life and career ==
Pearce was born and raised in Derbyshire. His mother was a National Health Service nurse.

He attended Murray Park School and Mackworth Tertiary College before going on to Newcastle University where he completed a bachelor's degree in History and Politics.

In his early life Pearce worked stacking shelves in a supermarket, as a crew member for McDonald's, as a waiter in a pub, in sales selling computers, as a shop assistant in an off-licence, boxing chocolates in the Thorntons factory in Belper and as a car park attendant.

Following university, Pearce worked for a charity in the North East helping vulnerable people live in warmer homes, before being seconded into the civil service to help with the implementation of the Labour Government's fuel poverty strategy, under the Blair premiership.

Pearce went on to work for the Labour Party, first as an organiser, and then as a policy adviser on housing, transport and local government. Following the 2006 local elections, Pearce converted to law, attending Nottingham Law School. He completed his legal training contract at Eversheds Sutherland to become a solicitor. He spent the following 14 years as an employment lawyer, specialising in workers' rights and discrimination law, becoming a partner at healthcare specialist firm Hempsons in 2020.

== Parliamentary career ==
Pearce was elected Member of Parliament for High Peak at the 2024 General Election, defeating incumbent Conservative MP Robert Largan with 22,533 votes (45.8%) and a majority of 7,908 (16.1%). During his campaign, Pearce focused on local issues such as the lack of access to NHS dentists, community centre closures, the polluting of rivers and waters and insufficient free student bus travel.

Pearce asked his first question in Parliament on 23 July, referring to the High Peak as an 'NHS dental desert', and asked what plans the government had to tackle this issue.

Pearce made his maiden speech during the Passenger Railway Services (Public Ownership) Bill on 29 July, where he said that "When I was young, my father worked on British Rail as a storeman." Pearce recounted the fear of layoffs during the 1990s when rail companies were privatised, while supporting the government's bill to renationalise rail companies. He also referenced his plans for the High Peak to get its 'fair share' of national economic growth and investment.

On 6 August, Pearce announced that, in partnership with Mayor of the East Midlands Claire Ward, students in High Peak attending college in Greater Manchester would receive free bus travel, delivering on a key local campaign pledge.

On 17 September 2024, Pearce was announced as the new chair of Labour Friends of Israel, replacing Steve McCabe who had stepped down at the 2024 election.

In December 2024, he replaced Josh Simons on the Science, Innovation and Technology Select Committee.

Following the publication in December 2024 of a white paper proposing detail for the forthcoming English Devolution Bill, Pearce announced his support to merge all or part of the Borough of High Peak into Greater Manchester.

In September 2025, Pearce was appointed Parliamentary Private Secretary to the Prime Minister, Keir Starmer.

In January 2026, Pearce was announced as UK Special Envoy for Post-Holocaust Issues.

== Personal life ==
Pearce lives in Hope Valley with his wife and children. He is a lifelong supporter of Derby County F.C. and has previously been the chair of the RamsTrust, a supporters' group that aims to secure the long-term sustainability of the club.

Parliament of the United Kingdom
Preceded by Robert Largan	Member of Parliament for High Peak; 2024–present	Incumbent
