= Christopher Hawkins (High Peak MP) =

British politician (1937–2023)

Member of Parliament for High Peak
- In office 1983–1992
- Preceded by: Spencer Le Marchant
- Succeeded by: Charles Hendry

Personal details
- Born: 26 November 1937 Saffron Walden, Essex, England
- Died: 11 November 2023 (aged 85)
- Party: Conservative
- Education: University of Bristol

Christopher James Hawkins (26 November 1937 – 11 November 2023) was a British politician. He was a British Conservative Party Member of Parliament for High Peak constituency in Derbyshire from the 1983 general election until he stood down in 1992.

== Life and career ==
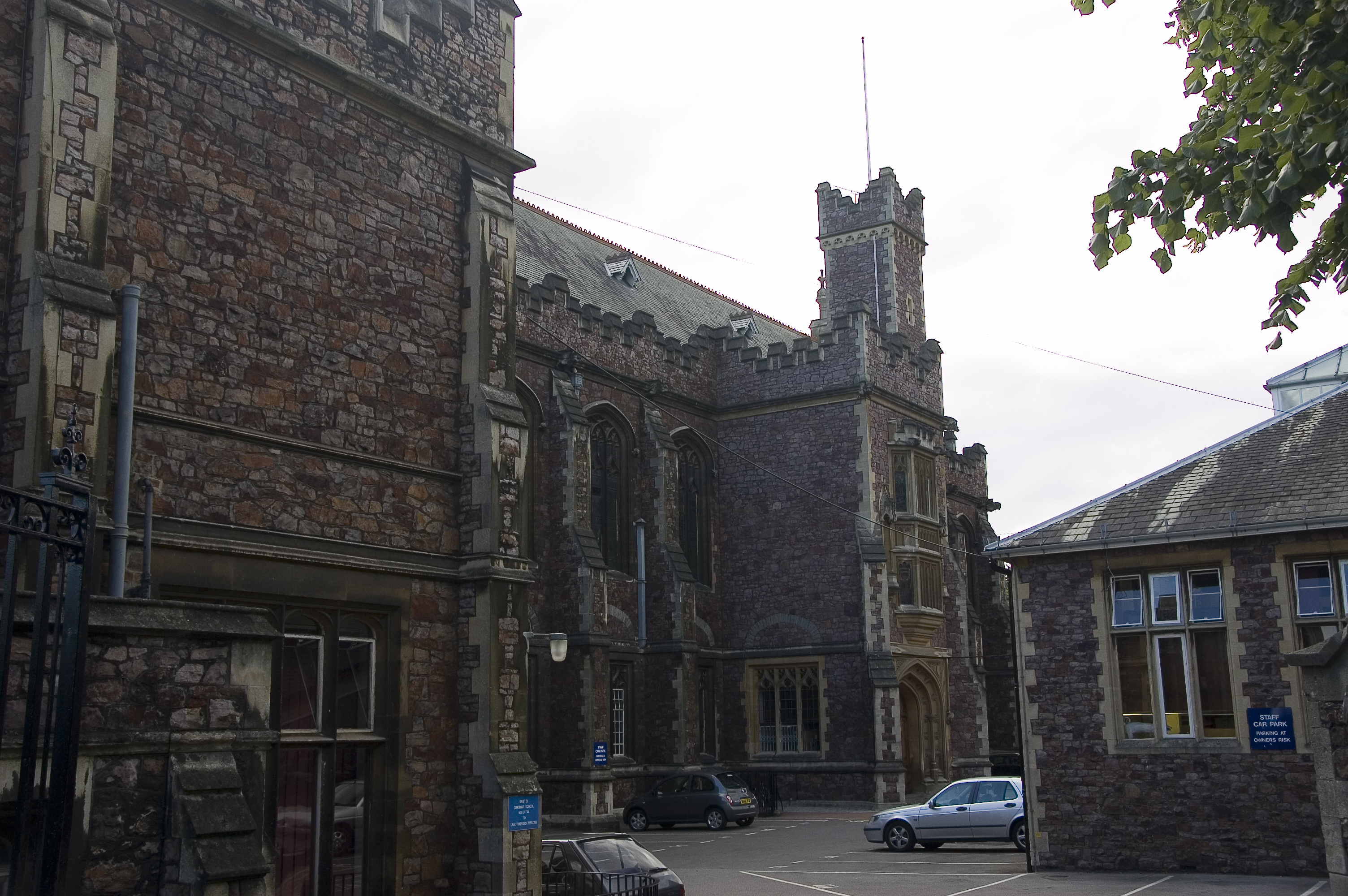
Bristol Grammar School

Hawkins was born in Saffron Walden on 26 November 1937. He was educated at Bristol Grammar School and the University of Bristol from which he graduated with a BA (Hons) in Economics. From 1959 to 1966, he worked as an economist for Courtaulds, with periods of secondment in Nigeria and Tunisia. Hawkins then joined the Economics Department of the University of Southampton where he was successively Lecturer and Senior Lecturer.

In his Who’s Who entry, Hawkins listed reading, music and sailing as recreations. Sailing was more than a recreation for Hawkins designed several yachts. An early design was the GK 24 of 1977, but his most successful design was the Hawk 20 which he developed with Reid Marine, a firm in Christchurch, Dorset, and which was launched at the Southampton Boat Show in 1993; the boat is described in Sailing Today Test Report (April 2001).

After leaving Parliament, he was the Deputy Chairman of the Black Country Development Corporation until 1998.

Hawkins died on 11 November 2023, at the age of 85.

== Selected publications ==
- "On the Sales Revenue Maximization Hypothesis", The Journal of Industrial Economics, Vol. 18, No. 2 (April 1970), pp. 129–140.
- (edited with George McKenzie) The British economy : what will our children think? London: Macmillan 1982.
- (with C. B. Chapman, and S. C. Ward) Pricing Policy Models: A Case Study in Practical O.R., The Journal of the Operational Research Society, Vol. 35, No. 7 (Jul., 1984), pp. 597–603.

== Sources ==
- Times Guide to the House of Commons 1987
- Who's Who 2015
- Leigh Rayment's Historical List of MPs

Parliament of the United Kingdom
Preceded by Spencer Le Marchant	Member of Parliament for High Peak; 1983–1992	Succeeded by Charles Hendry
