= 1939 High Peak by-election =

UK Parliamentary by-election

The 1939 High Peak by-election was held on 7 October 1939. The by-election was held due to the death of the incumbent Conservative MP, Alfred Law. It was won by the Conservative candidate Hugh Molson.
