= William Sidebottom (English politician) =

British politician (1841–1933)

Sidebottom in 1895

William Sidebottom (1841 – 3 January 1933) was an English Conservative politician who represented High Peak.

Sidebottom was born at Hollingworth, then in Cheshire, the son of William and Agnes Sidebottom, and came from a family that was associated with cotton mills. He had a military background and attained the rank of Colonel.

Around 1870, William Sidebottom and his sister Lucy took over Harewood Lodge, one of the old family homes at Broadbottom and became leading figures in the village. He was a town councillor, justice of the peace and captain of the Local Volunteers. He was elected member of parliament for High Peak in 1885, and held the seat until 1900. Sidebottom was deputy chairman of Cammell Laird.

Parliament of the United Kingdom
New constituency	Member of Parliament for High Peak; 1885 – 1900	Succeeded by Oswald Partington
