= Peter Jackson (politician) =

British Labour Party politician (1928–2020)

Peter Michael Jackson

Member of Parliament for High Peak (UK Parliament constituency)
- In office 1966–1970
- Preceded by: David Walder
- Succeeded by: Spencer Le Marchant

Personal details
- Born: 14 October 1928 Sheffield, England
- Died: 19 February 2020 (aged 91) Panama

Peter Michael Jackson (14 October 1928 – 19 February 2020) was a British Labour Party politician.

== Life and career ==
Jackson was born in Sheffield on 14 October 1928, and was educated at Sheffield Grammar School, Durham University, and University College, Leicester. He was married to Christine Thomas from 1961 to 1979.

At the 1966 general election, he was elected as the Member of Parliament for the High Peak constituency in Derbyshire, ending nearly 56 years of Conservative dominance and was the first ever Labour Party MP for the seat. Jackson sat in the House of Commons for only four years, and lost his seat at the 1970 general election, to the Conservative Spencer Le Marchant. He was the enthusiastic secretary of the Humanist Parliamentary Group from 1967 to 1970.

He was interviewed in 2012 as part of The History of Parliament's oral history project.

Jackson died on 19 February 2020, at the age of 91, after being taken ill while on a cruise.

== Sources ==
- Leigh Rayment's Historical List of MPs

Parliament of the United Kingdom
Preceded by David Walder	Member of Parliament for High Peak; 1966–1970	Succeeded by Spencer Le Marchant
