= Robert Largan =

British Conservative politician

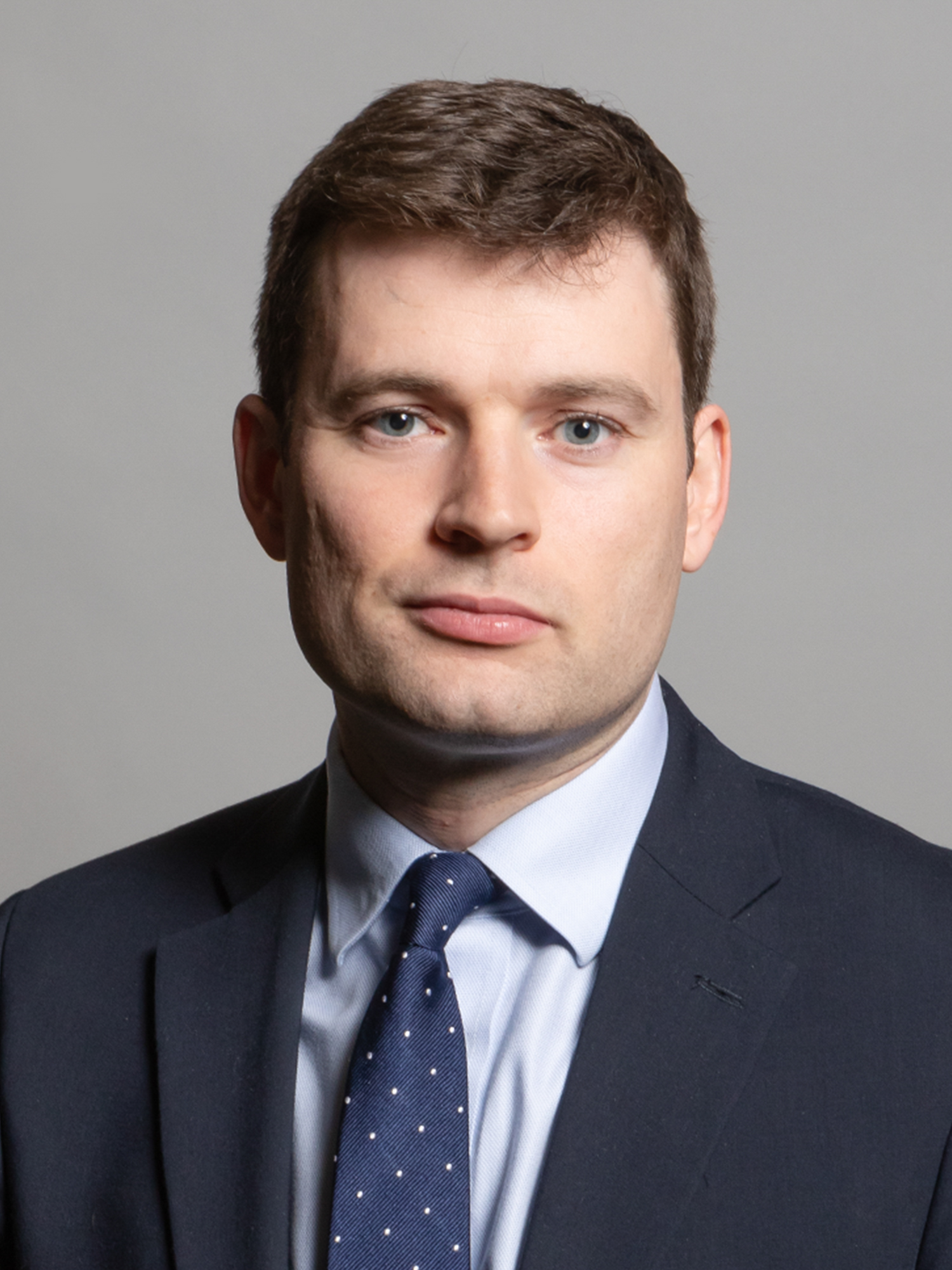
- Official portrait, 2020

Assistant Government Whip
- In office 27 October 2022 – 5 July 2024
- Prime Minister: Rishi Sunak

Member of Parliament for High Peak
- In office 12 December 2019 – 30 May 2024
- Preceded by: Ruth George
- Succeeded by: Jon Pearce

Personal details
- Born: 29 May 1987 (age 39) Manchester, England
- Party: Conservative
- Education: University of Manchester

Robert Largan (born 29 May 1987) is a British Conservative Party politician who was the Member of Parliament (MP) for High Peak from 2019 to 2024. He served as Assistant Government Whip from October 2022 until July 2024.

== Early life and career ==
Robert Largan was born on 29 May 1987 in Whitefield, Greater Manchester, the son of Terry and Johanna Largan. Largan's father came from a large Irish Catholic family in Salford and had a variety of occupations, including a Shabbos goy, plasterer, postman, and trade union shop steward. His mother left school with no qualifications, caring for her younger sisters following the death of her father, and later worked in the Department of Social Security. Largan attended his local comprehensive, Philips High School, then studied economics and politics at the University of Manchester between 2005 and 2008.

His first job was working behind the fish counter at the supermarket Asda while studying at university.

Largan later moved to London, where he trained as a chartered accountant and was hired by Deloitte in 2012, working in equity capital markets until 2017. From 2017 to 2018 he worked as a Policy Advisor at the Department for International Trade.

Largan began his political career with the Conservative Party in 2014, gaining a seat as a local councillor for Sands End in Hammersmith and Fulham London Borough Council. He also worked as a Parliamentary Assistant for Greg Hands.

Largan was working in finance for Marks & Spencer in Manchester when he became the prospective parliamentary candidate for High Peak in 2018.

== Parliamentary career ==
At the 2017 general election, Largan unsuccessfully contested the Bury South constituency for the Conservatives, where he finished second with 41.6% of the vote behind the incumbent Labour Party MP Ivan Lewis.

In 2018, Largan unsuccessfully stood for selection in Crewe and Nantwich.

At the 2019 general election, Largan was elected as the Member of Parliament for High Peak with a majority of 590 and with 45.9% of the vote. This is a bellwether seat that had been taken by Labour at the previous general election.

On 2 March 2020, Largan was elected to serve on the Transport Select Committee to scrutinise the Department for Transport. In his role on the committee, he contributed to inquiries into various issues, including the impact of the coronavirus pandemic on the aviation sector and the rollout and safety of smart motorways.

Largan gave his maiden speech on 23 March 2020, during an emergency debate on the Coronavirus Bill which introduced a range of new powers to tackle the Covid-19 pandemic. He used the speech to call on the Government to urgently provide more support to the self-employed. Largan also promised to take an independent-minded approach to politics, said he was "prepared to criticise [his] party and the Government when they get things wrong", and concluded his speech by saying "our greatest reforms—universal suffrage, civil liberties, the NHS—were secured not through ideological purity or confrontation, but by collaboration and taking the view that compromise is not betrayal but a kind of victory." Labour MP Chris Bryant followed this speech by commending Largan's stance against ideological purity.

In November 2020, he founded the All-Party Parliamentary Group for the Peak District and was elected chair, noting a focus on bringing green jobs to the region.

After backing frontrunner Rishi Sunak in the second Conservative leadership election, Largan was appointed Assistant Government Whip on 25 October 2022.

In February 2023, Largan was re-selected as the Conservative candidate for High Peak at the 2024 general election.

Largan was criticised in June 2024 for using banners on social media mimicking other political parties. In response, Derbyshire Police confirmed that no electoral rules had been broken.

He was beaten by Labour candidate Jon Pearce in the 2024 general election.

== Political beliefs ==
Largan describes himself as an "independent-minded moderate". He was a member of the One Nation Caucus of Conservative MPs. Asked in an interview why he was a Conservative, Largan responded that his father had said that they were the “least worst option."

In the 2016 EU membership referendum, Largan voted Remain. In December 2019, Largan voted for the Withdrawal Agreement which allowed the UK to leave the EU on 31 January 2020. In September 2020, Largan voted for the Internal Markets Bill, although he expressed concerns about the impact on the Belfast (Good Friday) Agreement. Largan voted in favour of the Trade and Cooperation Agreement between the UK and the EU in December 2020.

Largan campaigned strongly against antisemitism and pushed for organisations to adopt the International Holocaust Remembrance Alliance (IHRA) definition of antisemitism.

Largan was also a parliamentary officer of the Conservative Friends of Israel (CFoI). In 2019, CFoI paid for Largan to visit Israel and the West Bank on a fact finding political delegation.

During the Coronavirus pandemic he consistently called on the Government to get wage support, grants and loans into the hands of businesses and individuals as fast as possible.

Largan is a member of the Conservative Environmental Network and is a keen advocate for environmental and conservation causes.

Largan lobbied for the restoration of peat moors. His first question in Parliament highlighted the importance of restoring peatlands to reduce fire risk and tackle climate change.

Following two major wildfires in the High Peak, Largan introduced a Ten Minute Rule Bill entitled 'The Disposable Barbecues Bill'. The Bill, which received cross-party support, proposed banning the use of disposable barbecues on open moorland and giving local authorities the power to regulate (and potentially ban) their sale. In his speech, Largan made the case for protecting the countryside from wildfires, as well as setting out the importance of moorland restoration and educating people on the Countryside Code.

Largan voted in favour of the amendment, put forward by crossbench peer Charles Wellesley, 9th Duke of Wellington, which would put a legal duty on water companies to prevent untreated sewage being released into rivers and waterways. The Government subsequently introduced their own similar amendment in what Largan described as “a big win for those of us campaigning to protect our rivers from pollution.”

Largan supported the introduction of safe standing in Premier League and Championship football stadia and has engaged with various football supporters' clubs to discuss what more can be done nationally to improve the matchday experience of football fans.

In July 2021, Largan successfully brought an extension to the now paused controversial Clean Air Zone, to include all roads into Mottram and Hollingworth.

In September 2021, Largan raised the issue of increasing access to face-to-face GP services at Prime Minister’s Questions, citing cancer diagnosis as a key concern.

== Post-parliamentary career ==
Following his defeat at the 2024 UK General Election, Largan was appointed as a Board Member of the Antisemitism Policy Trust.

== Personal life ==
Largan lives in Glossop. He was the first High Peak Member of Parliament to live in Glossop since 1929. Largan got married in August 2026 to Eleanor, whom he met in Manchester and who works in policing.

Parliament of the United Kingdom
Preceded by Ruth George	Member of Parliament for High Peak; 2019–2024	Succeeded by Jon Pearce
