= David Walder =

British politician

Member of Parliament for Clitheroe
- In office 18 June 1970 – 26 October 1978
- Preceded by: Francis Pearson
- Succeeded by: David Waddington

Member of Parliament for High Peak
- In office 16 March 1961 – 10 March 1966
- Preceded by: Hugh Molson
- Succeeded by: Peter Jackson

Personal details
- Born: Alan David Walder; 13 November 1928 London, England
- Died: 26 October 1978 (aged 49) London, England
- Party: Conservative
- Spouse: Elspeth Milligan (m. 1956)
- Children: 4
- Education: Christ Church, Oxford
- Profession: Barrister; author

Military service
- Branch/service: British Army
- Rank: Major
- Unit: Royal Artillery; 4th Hussars

Alan David Walder (13 November 1928 – 26 October 1978) was a British Conservative Party politician, author and barrister who was the Member of Parliament for High Peak from 1961 to 1966, and for Clitheroe from 1970 until his death.

== Background ==
Born in St Pancras, London, Walder was educated at Latymer School and Christ Church, Oxford. He was commissioned into the Royal Artillery in 1948. In 1953 he transferred to the 4th Hussars (Army Emergency Reserve) and was promoted lieutenant. He was promoted captain in 1956, and later promoted Major. He became a barrister, called to the bar by Inner Temple in 1956.

== Career ==
He unsuccessfully contested the Leicester South West constituency at the 1959 general election. He was elected Member of Parliament (MP) for High Peak at a 1961 by-election, but lost the seat at the 1966 general election, to Labour's Peter Jackson.

He was returned to the House of Commons at the 1970 general election as MP for Clitheroe, which he held until his death. Walder was an assistant government whip from 1973 to 1974.

Walder coined "Walder's Law" which stated that the first three speakers at any meeting of the 1922 Committee were "Mad."

Walder's successor at the by-election following his death was David Waddington.

Walder was also a noted author and military historian. His works included humorous fiction relating primarily to his experiences in the army and politics, and comprised:

- Bags of Swank (1963)
- The Short List (1964)
- The House Party (1966)
- The Fair Ladies of Salamanca (1967)
- The Chanak Affair (1969)
- The Short Victorious War: Russo-Japanese Conflict 1904–5 (1973)
- Nelson (1978).

== Personal life and death ==
In 1956, Walder married Elspeth Milligan, and they had four children.

On 26 October 1978, Walder was dining at a London restaurant when he suffered an apparent heart attack; he died later that evening at St Stephen's Hospital, at the age of 49.

Parliament of the United Kingdom
Preceded by Hugh Molson	Member of Parliament for High Peak; 1961–1966	Succeeded by Peter Jackson
Preceded by Sir Francis Pearson	Member of Parliament for Clitheroe; 1970–1978	Succeeded by David Waddington
