= Charles Hendry =

British Conservative Party politician (born 1959)

The Right Honourable Charles Hendry CBE
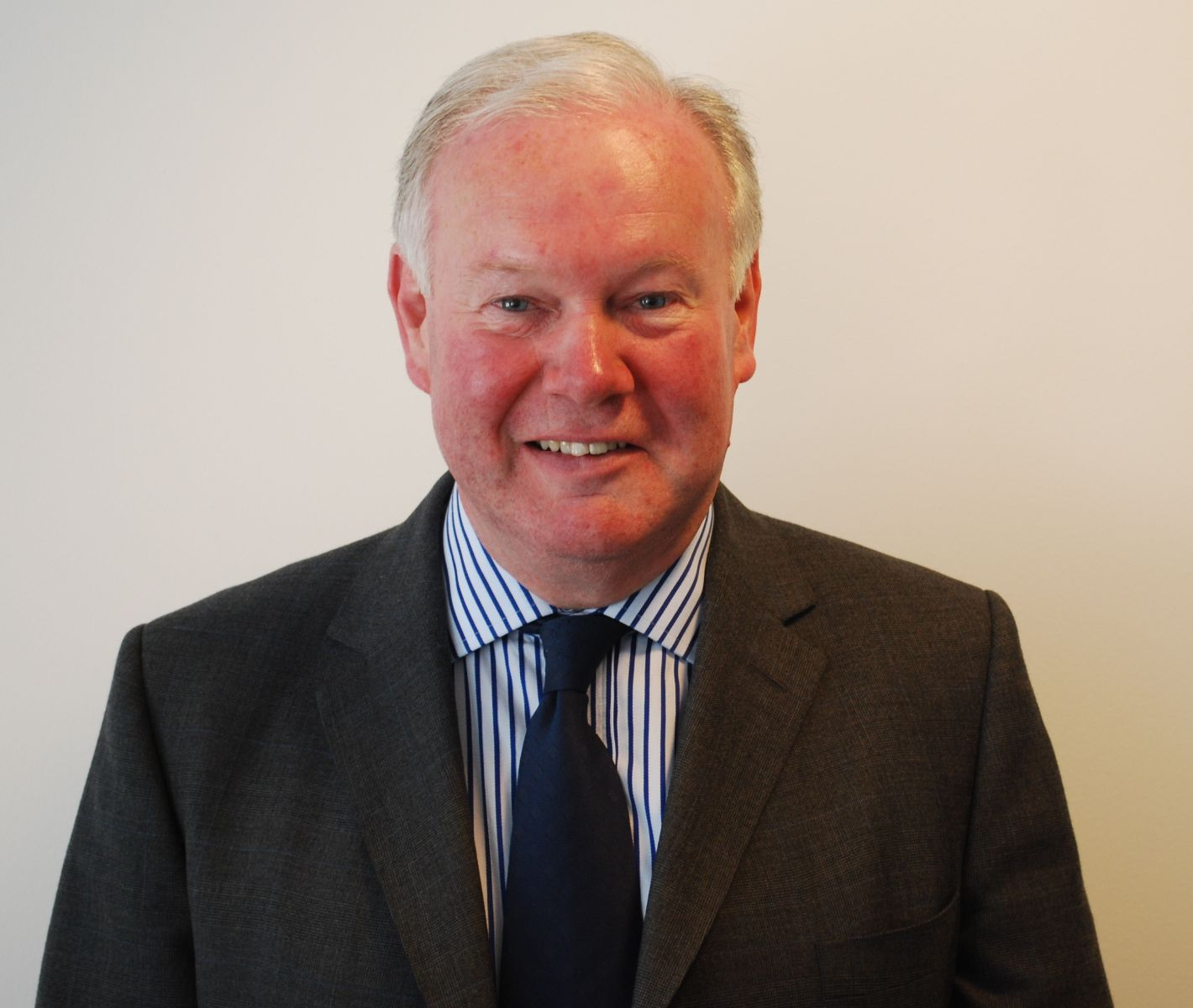
- Hendry in 2010

Minister of State for Energy and Climate Change
- In office 12 May 2010 – 4 September 2012
- Prime Minister: David Cameron
- Preceded by: Joan Ruddock
- Succeeded by: John Hayes

Member of Parliament for Wealden
- In office 7 June 2001 – 30 March 2015
- Preceded by: Geoffrey Johnson-Smith
- Succeeded by: Nus Ghani

Member of Parliament for High Peak
- In office 9 April 1992 – 8 April 1997
- Preceded by: Christopher Hawkins
- Succeeded by: Tom Levitt

Personal details
- Born: 6 May 1959 (age 67) Cuckfield, Sussex, England
- Party: Conservative
- Spouse: Sallie Moores
- Education: University of Edinburgh

Charles Hendry, CBE PC (born 6 May 1959) is a British Conservative Party politician. Formerly the Member of Parliament (MP) for High Peak between the 1992 and 1997 general elections, he was elected as the MP for Wealden in 2001. In May 2010 he was appointed Minister of State for the Department of Energy and Climate Change and served until 2012. He stood down at the 2015 general election.

== Early life ==
The son of a stockbroker, Hendry was educated at Rugby School, Warwickshire and the University of Edinburgh where he was awarded a Bachelor of Commerce (BComm) degree in Business Studies in 1981. He was the president of the Edinburgh University Conservative Association in 1979. He worked as an account manager with press relations firm Ogilvy and Mather for six years from 1982, and from 1988 to 1990 he worked as a special adviser for successive Secretaries of State for Social Security John Moore and Tony Newton. Hendry became a senior consultant with Burson-Marsteller in 1990, where he remained until his election to Parliament. During his time out of Parliament from 1997 to 2001, he served as the chief of staff to the Leader of the Opposition William Hague.

== Political career ==
=== Early political activities ===
Hendry was the vice-chairman of the Scottish Federation of Conservative Students in 1980 and was elected as the vice-chairman of the Battersea Conservative Association for two years in 1981.

He unsuccessfully contested the Central Scotland seat of Clackmannan at the 1983 general election where he came third, finishing 9,988 votes behind the sitting Labour MP Martin O'Neill. He contested the Nottinghamshire seat of Mansfield at the 1987 general election where he was narrowly defeated by Alan Meale, who won by just 56 votes: this was the joint closest constituency vote in the whole election.

=== In parliament ===
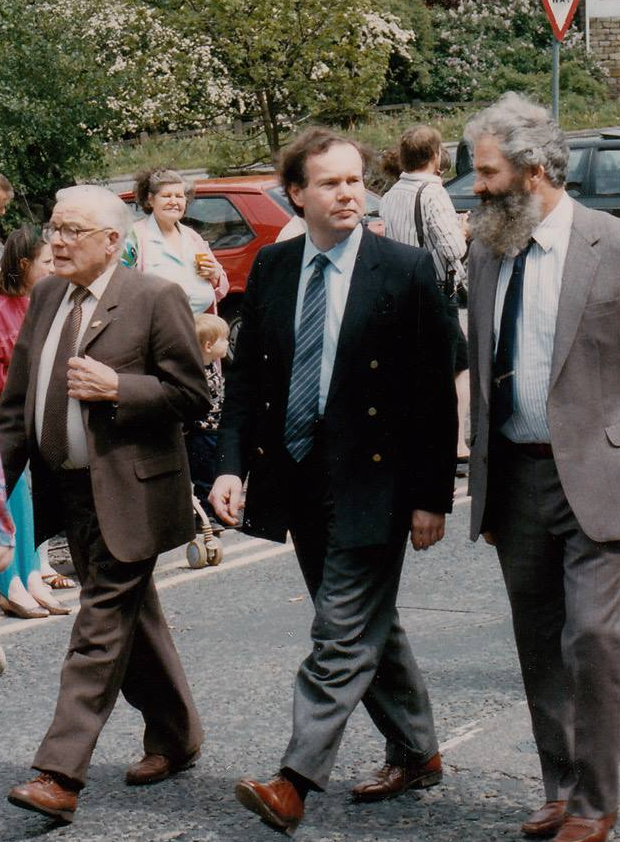
Hendry (centre) during his time as MP for High Peak

Hendry was elected to the House of Commons at the 1992 general election for the Derbyshire seat of High Peak following the retirement of the Conservative MP Christopher Hawkins. Hendry held the seat with a majority of 4,819.

In Parliament he was a member of the procedure select committee for three years from 1992 and he was appointed as the Parliamentary Private Secretary (PPS) to the Minister of State at the Department of Social Security William Hague in 1994 for a year, and also served briefly as the PPS to the Secretary of State for Education and Employment Gillian Shephard in 1995. He also served on the Northern Ireland select committee 1994–1996. He was appointed as the vice chairman of the Conservative Party in 1995 by John Major, in which capacity he remained until he lost his seat, representing part of the Peak District, at the 1997 general election when he was defeated by Labour's Tom Levitt by 8,791 votes. He was re-elected to parliament at the 2001 general election for the East Sussex seat of Wealden following the retirement of the Conservative MP Geoffrey Johnson Smith. Hendry retained his new seat for his party with a majority of 13,772.

On his re-election in 2001, he was appointed an Opposition Whip by Hague, and was appointed as a spokesman on Education and Skills in 2003 under the leadership of Iain Duncan Smith. In June 2003, he called for the introduction of "first time voter packs" to help to engage young people in the political process. However, he was moved in July 2003 under Michael Howard to again become a vice-chairman of the Conservative Party before serving as a spokesman on trade and industry from early 2005. He served briefly as a member of the culture, media and sport select committee in 2004. He also served as the vice-chairman of the all-party groups on endometriosis, Internet and management.

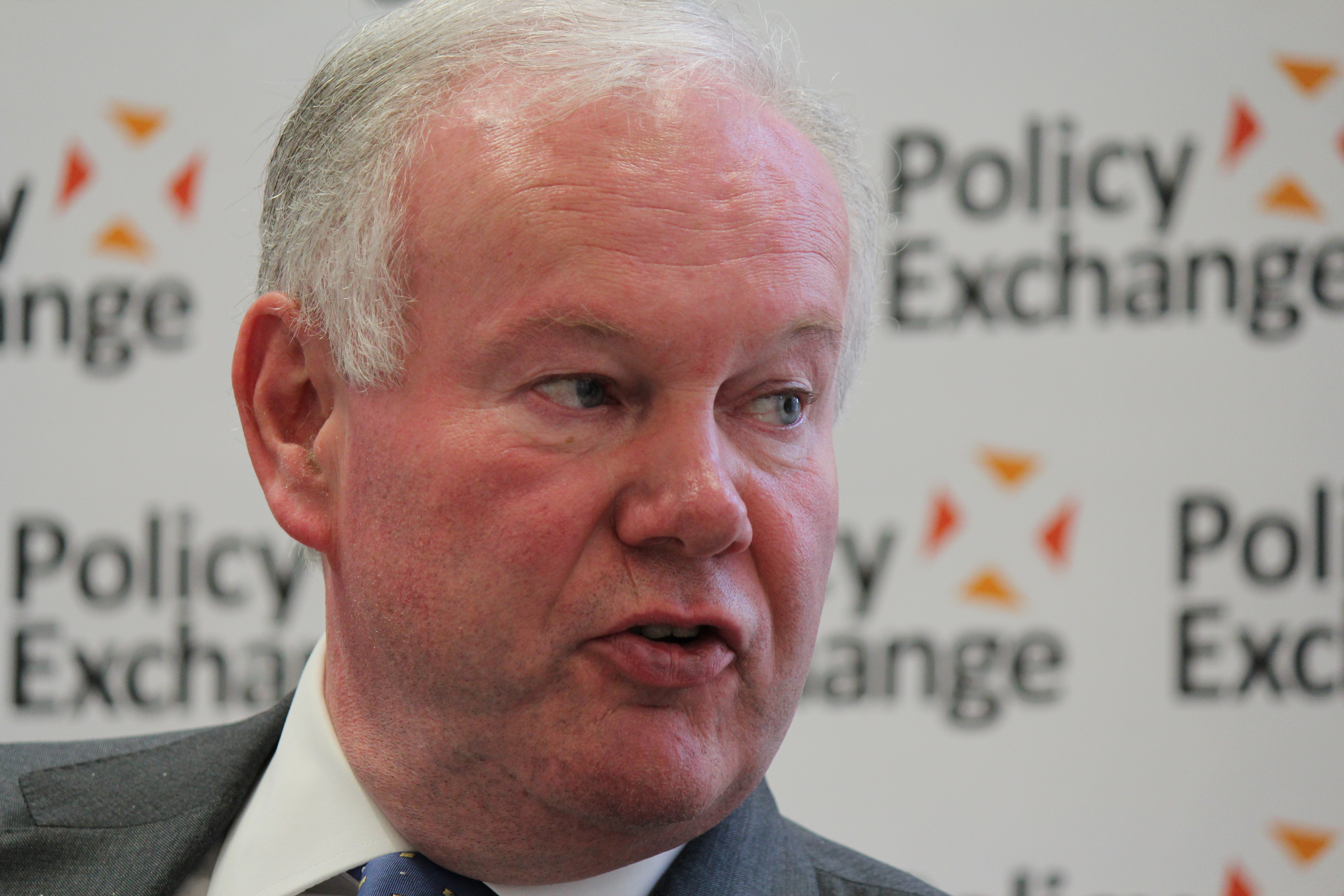
Hendry speaking in 2013

In September 2006, Hendry became a Patron of the Tory Reform Group. Hendry was a Shadow Minister of State for Energy and Climate Change from October 2008. He became Minister of State for Energy and Climate Change in May 2010 before being replaced by John Hayes in September 2012. Five months later he was announced as the new Chairman of Forewind, the offshore wind farms joint venture, replacing Lord Deben who had resigned the chairmanship in September 2012 when he became Chair of the Committee on Climate Change.

In January 2008 he was appointed as a Vice-Chair of the Board of Trustees of UK Youth Parliament. He had served as Co-Chair from late 2006 but governance changes dissolved the Co-Chair system in favour of a sole Chair.

Hendry was president of the Russo-British Chamber of Commerce (RBCC) Advisory Council.

In May 2010 he took his share of the vote to the 30th largest of the Conservatives' 307 seats, on an absolute majority of votes at 56.6%. Since November 2012, he has been the Prime Ministerial Trade Envoy to Azerbaijan, Kazakhstan and Turkmenistan.

In March 2013, Hendry announced he would stand down as MP at the 2015 general election.

In July 2013, it became known that Hendry had secured a job as adviser to the Atlantic Supergrid Corporation which plans to import power to the UK via an undersea cable from Iceland. Hendry had signed an energy pact with Iceland while he was Minister of State at the Department of Energy and Climate Change.

In March 2015, he was appointed to the Privy Council of the United Kingdom and therefore granted the title The Right Honourable.

Hendry was appointed Commander of the Order of the British Empire (CBE) in the 2019 Birthday Honours for services to UK trade and investment.

== Personal life ==
Hendry married Sallie Moores, who had first married into the Moores family of the Littlewoods company, in July 1995 in Westminster and has two sons and two stepchildren. In 2011 they sold their London home for £4.75 million and bought Blair Castle in Ayrshire.

Hendry was a director of London Oil & Gas, which borrowed £129 million from London Capital & Finance. Following the collapse of LC&F, administrators named Hendry as one of thirteen people they were intending to sue in order to recoup £178 million of investors funds.

Parliament of the United Kingdom
Preceded by Christopher Hawkins	Member of Parliament for High Peak; 1992–1997	Succeeded by Tom Levitt
Preceded by Geoffrey Johnson-Smith	Member of Parliament for Wealden; 2001–2015	Succeeded by Nus Ghani
