= County Hall, Matlock =

County building in Matlock, Derbyshire, England

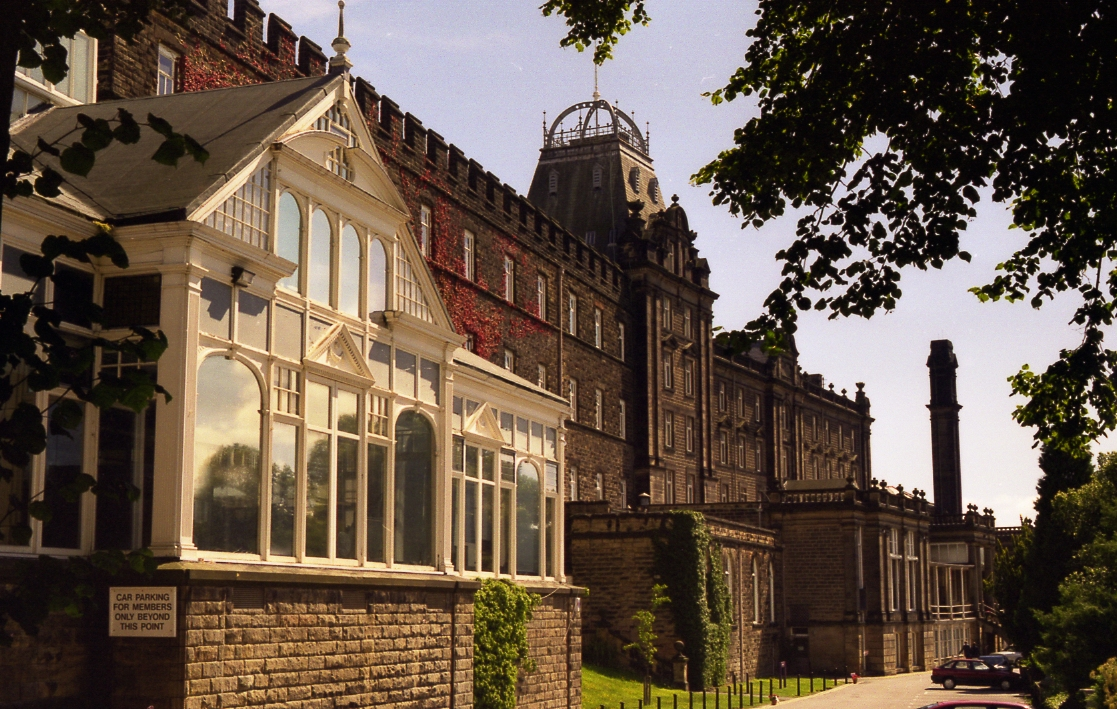
- County Hall, Matlock

- Location within Derbyshire
- 53.1422°N 1.5514°W
- Location: Matlock, Derbyshire

History
- Built: 1867

Site notes
- Architectural style: Victorian style

Listed Building – Grade II
- Designated: 26 October 1972
- Reference no.: 1248195

The County Hall is a municipal building in Matlock, Derbyshire, England. The building, which was originally a hydropathic establishment known as Smedley's Hydro but is now the headquarters of Derbyshire County Council, is a Grade II listed building.

== History ==
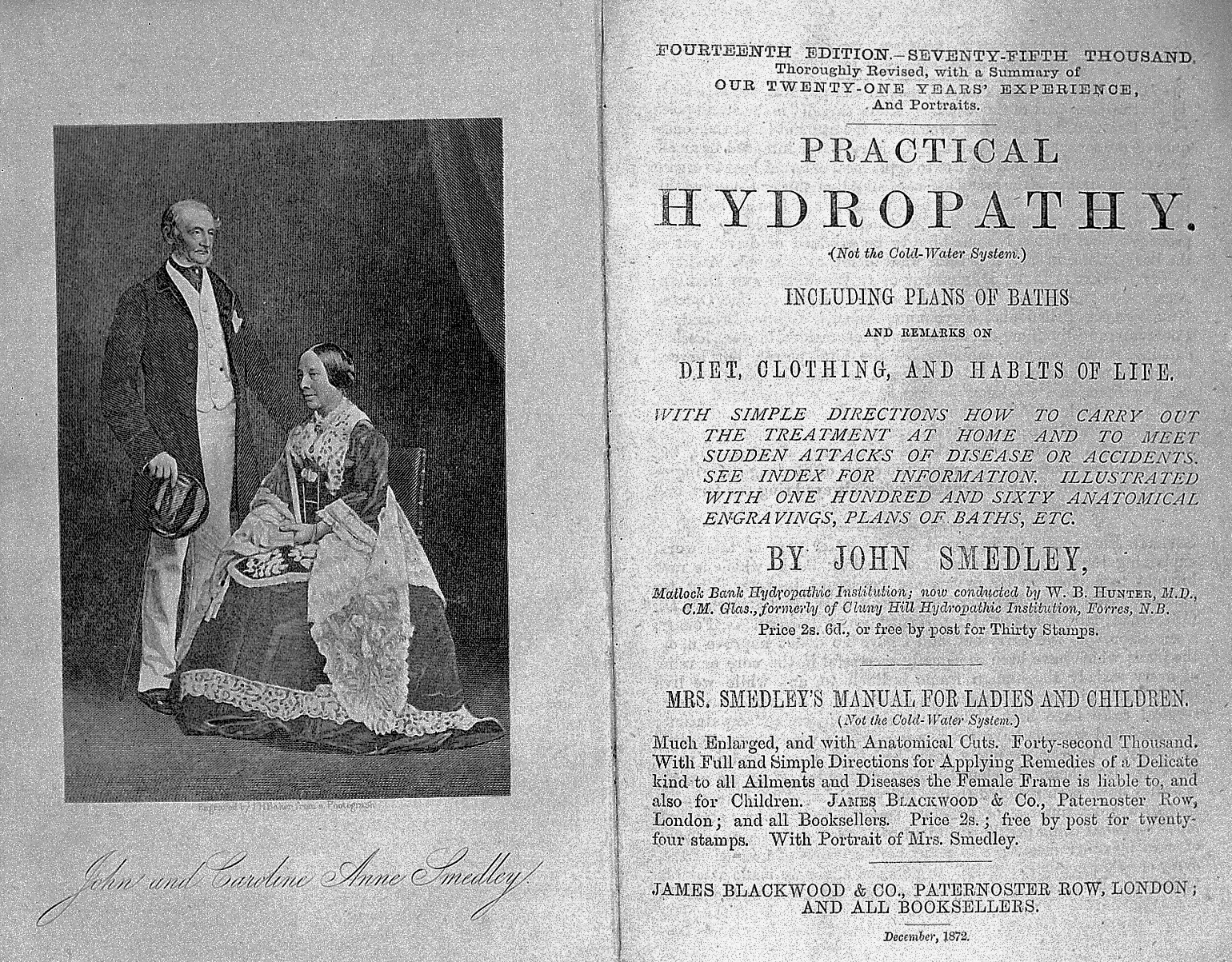
John and Caroline Smedley in their book on hydropathy. Credit: Wellcome Library

While on honeymoon in Switzerland in 1847, John Smedley had become seriously ill. On returning to England, he recuperated at the hydropathic establishment at Ben Rhydding in Yorkshire and later took the waters at Cheltenham. From then on, hydropathy was the greatest interest in Smedley's life.

Matlock had developed as a spa town after thermal springs were discovered and the building on Matlock Bank was originally established as a small private hospital in 1851. It was acquired by John Smedley, the hospital's medical adviser, in 1853.

The earliest (western) section of the building seen today was built by Smedley in c. 1867. The design involved a main frontage of eleven bays with sash windows. Much of today's building was added after Smedley's death in 1874. The first phase, in 1881, included the entrance hall and staircase, now in the middle section: a large stained glass window, depicting the goddess Hygieia on the left, Truth in the middle and the god Asclepius on the right, was designed and installed on the staircase by Shrigley and Hunt in 1882.

In 1886, the eastern section, including the tower with its square mansard roof, was added by architect George Statham of Nottingham. Later extensions include the tall chimney, impressive for its height on the already prominent site, along with boiler house and bath in 1894. The domed glass Winter Gardens, which housed a ballroom, and the northern block on the other side of Smedley Street were added in 1901. The northern block was linked by the unusual two storey bridge over Smedley Street.

The facility soon became the largest hydropathic hotel in the town:

John Smedley was not the first to recognise and exploit the effects of water treatment on various illnesses, but it was Smedley whose conviction and enterprise established Hydrotherapy firmly in Matlock, and for a century made it one of the most celebrated centres of the "water cure". By the outbreak of war in 1939, Smedley's Hydro was world famous, its guests having included Robert Louis Stevenson, Sir Thomas Beecham, Ivor Novello, Jimmy Wilde, and Gilbert Jessop, to name but a few.

During the Second World War, the site became the School of Military Intelligence which operated until 1946. Smedley's Hydro closed in the 1950s, and, after the old County Hall in Derby was deemed too small, the hydro was purchased in 1955 by Derbyshire County Council as the new County Hall. After works to convert the building into an administrative centre had been completed, it was officially re-opened by Alderman Charles White on 28 April 1956.

Part of the County Hall complex was seen in Ken Russell's Oscar-winning 1969 film Women in Love.
