= 1961 High Peak by-election =

UK Parliamentary by-election

The 1961 High Peak by-election was held on 16 March 1961. It was held due to the incumbent Conservative, Hugh Molson, being granted a Life Peerage. It was won by the Conservative David Walder.

== Candidates ==
The local Liberal association selected 31-year-old Dennis Wrigley as their candidate. He was an architect. He was educated at Manchester Grammar School and Manchester Regional School of Architecture. He was President of the Lancashire, Cheshire and North Western Young Liberal Federation. He had contested Oldham East at the 1959 general election where he polled 15% of the vote and came third.

== Result ==
High Peak by-election, 1961
Party	Candidate	Votes	%	±%
Conservative	David Walder	13,069	37.4	−8.6
Labour	Wilfred McCormack Halsall	11,201	32.1	−1.9
Liberal	Dennis Ian Wrigley	10,674	30.5	+10.5
Majority		1,868	5.3	−6.7
Turnout		34,944		
Conservative hold		Swing		
