= High Peak (constituency) =

Parliamentary constituency in the United Kingdom, 1885 onwards

Coordinates: 53.35°N 1.85°W

- County constituency for the House of Commons
- Interactive map of boundaries since 2010
- Location within the East Midlands
- County: Derbyshire
- Electorate: 73,960 (March 2020)
- Major settlements: Buxton, Glossop, New Mills

Current constituency
- Created: 1885
- Member of Parliament: Jon Pearce (Labour)
- Seats: One
- Created from: North Derbyshire

High Peak is a parliamentary constituency (Note: A county constituency (for the purposes of election expenses and type of returning officer)) represented in the House of Commons of the UK Parliament since 2024 by Jon Pearce of the Labour Party. (Note: As with all constituencies, the constituency elects one Member of Parliament (MP) by the first past the post system of election at least every five years.)

The constituency is in north west Derbyshire and based in the heart of the Peak District, including the towns of Buxton, Glossop and New Mills.

Since the 1966 general election, the seat has been somewhat of a bellwether, with only three exceptions: at the February and October 1974 general elections the seat was won by the Conservative Party when the Labour Party won the most seats nationally, and at the 2017 general election when the seat was won by Labour but the Conservatives won the most seats nationally.

== Constituency profile ==
High Peak is a rural constituency in Derbyshire, covering a large part of the Peak District National Park, and is coterminous with the local government district of the same name. Its largest town is Buxton, which has a population of around 20,000. Other towns in the constituency include Glossop, New Mills, Chapel-en-le-Frith, Whaley Bridge and Hadfield. Buxton is a historic spa town of Roman origins, and is popular with tourists. Glossop and New Mills are traditionally industrial, particularly in coal mining and textile manufacturing. The area is generally upland and has closer transport connections to nearby Manchester and Sheffield than with Derby and the rest of the East Midlands. The constituency has average levels of wealth; there is some deprivation in Buxton, Gamesley and Hadfield whilst the rural areas are more affluent. House prices across the constituency are below the national average but above the rest of the East Midlands.

Residents of High Peak are generally older and well-educated compared to the rest of the country. Household income is higher than the regional average and a high proportion of residents work in the manufacturing and tourism sectors. White people made up 97% of the population at the 2021 census. At the local council level, most of the constituency is represented by the Labour Party, especially in the north around Glossop, particularly in the Manchester overspill Estate of Gamesley. Conservative councillors were elected in the areas surrounding Buxton. An estimated 51% of voters in High Peak supported leaving the European Union in the 2016 referendum, similar to the nationwide figure.

== Boundaries ==
1885–1918: The Borough of Glossop, and the Sessional Divisions of Buxton, Chapel-en-le-Frith, and Glossop.

1918–1950: The Boroughs of Buxton and Glossop, the Urban District of New Mills, the Rural Districts of Glossop Dale and Hayfield, and parts of the Rural Districts of Bakewell and Chapel-en-le-Frith.

1950–1983: The Boroughs of Buxton and Glossop, the Urban Districts of New Mills and Whaley Bridge, and the Rural District of Chapel-en-le-Frith.

1983–2010: The Borough of High Peak, and the District of West Derbyshire wards of Bradwell, Hathersage and Tideswell.

2010–present: The Borough of High Peak.

The boundaries were unchanged by the 2023 review of Westminster constituencies.

The constituency covers much of northern Derbyshire and represents most of the west of the Peak District which encircles Buxton and Glossop. Crowden, Tintwistle and Woodhead (formerly within the boundaries of Cheshire and in the Stalybridge and Hyde constituency) were brought into the seat in the boundary changes for the 1983 general election. The constituency boundaries became co-terminous with the local government district at the 2010 general election.

== History ==
The seat was created in the Redistribution of Seats Act 1885. Since 1910, the seat has returned mostly Conservative MPs apart from during three periods. A Labour MP was elected for the first time in 1966, but was unseated at the next general election. Labour gained the seat at the 1997 general election and retained it at the following two general elections during the Blair ministry, but it was regained by the Conservatives at the 2010 general election. It was regained by Labour at the 2017 general election when Ruth George gained the seat, the first time Labour had won the High Peak seat without winning the overall general election in its history.

== Members of Parliament ==
North Derbyshire prior to 1885

| Election | Member | Party |
|---|---|---|
| 1885 | William Sidebottom | Conservative |
| 1900 | Oswald Partington | Liberal |
| December 1910 | Samuel Hill-Wood | Unionist |
| 1929 | Alfred Law | Unionist |
| 1939 by-election | Hugh Molson | Conservative |
| 1961 by-election | David Walder | Conservative |
| 1966 | Peter Jackson | Labour |
| 1970 | Spencer Le Marchant | Conservative |
| 1983 | Christopher Hawkins | Conservative |
| 1992 | Charles Hendry | Conservative |
| 1997 | Tom Levitt | Labour |
| 2010 | Andrew Bingham | Conservative |
| 2017 | Ruth George | Labour |
| 2019 | Robert Largan | Conservative |
| 2024 | Jon Pearce | Labour |

== Elections ==
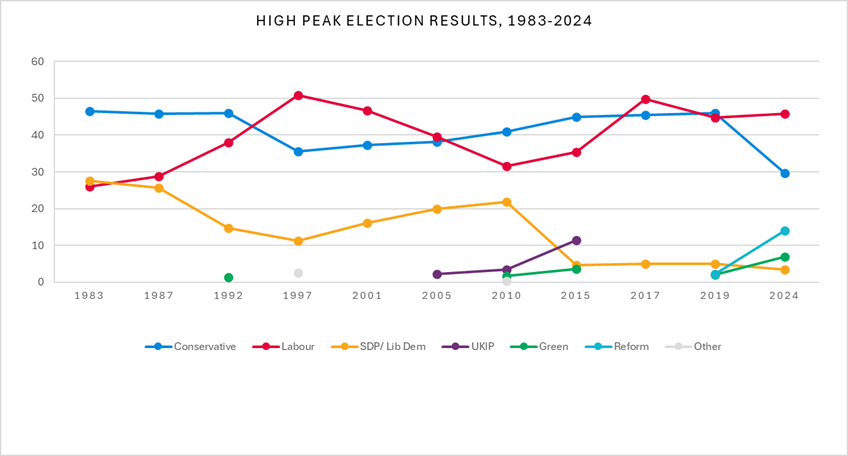
High Peak election results 1983-2024

=== Elections in the 2020s ===
General election 2024: High Peak
| Party | Candidate | Votes | % | ±% |
|---|---|---|---|---|
| Labour | Jon Pearce | 22,533 | 45.8 | +1.0 |
| Conservative | Robert Largan | 14,625 | 29.7 | −16.2 |
| Reform | Catherine Cullen | 6,959 | 14.1 | +11.9 |
| Green | Joanna Collins | 3,382 | 6.9 | +4.8 |
| Liberal Democrats | Peter Hirst | 1,707 | 3.5 | −1.6 |
| Majority | | 7,908 | 16.1 | N/A |
| Turnout | | 49,206 | 66.2 | −6.7 |
| Registered electors | | 74,385 | | |
| Labour gain from Conservative | | Swing | +8.6 | |

=== Elections in the 2010s ===
General election 2019: High Peak
| Party | Candidate | Votes | % | ±% |
|---|---|---|---|---|
| Conservative | Robert Largan | 24,844 | 45.9 | +0.5 |
| Labour | Ruth George | 24,254 | 44.8 | −4.9 |
| Liberal Democrats | David Lomax | 2,750 | 5.1 | +0.1 |
| Brexit Party | Alan Graves | 1,177 | 2.2 | New |
| Green | Robert Hodgetts-Haley | 1,148 | 2.1 | New |
| Majority | | 590 | 1.1 | N/A |
| Turnout | | 54,173 | 72.9 | −0.8 |
| Conservative gain from Labour | | Swing | +2.7 | |

General election 2017: High Peak
| Party | Candidate | Votes | % | ±% |
|---|---|---|---|---|
| Labour | Ruth George | 26,753 | 49.7 | +14.4 |
| Conservative | Andrew Bingham | 24,431 | 45.4 | +0.4 |
| Liberal Democrats | Charles Lawley | 2,669 | 5.0 | +0.3 |
| Majority | | 2,322 | 4.3 | N/A |
| Turnout | | 54,018 | 73.7 | +4.2 |
| Labour gain from Conservative | | Swing | +7.0 | |

General election 2015: High Peak
| Party | Candidate | Votes | % | ±% |
|---|---|---|---|---|
| Conservative | Andrew Bingham | 22,836 | 45.0 | +4.1 |
| Labour | Caitlin Bisknell | 17,942 | 35.3 | +3.7 |
| UKIP | Ian Guiver | 5,811 | 11.4 | +8.0 |
| Liberal Democrats | Stephen Worrall | 2,389 | 4.7 | −17.1 |
| Green | Charlotte Farrell | 1,811 | 3.6 | +1.8 |
| Majority | | 4,894 | 9.7 | +0.4 |
| Turnout | | 50,789 | 69.5 | −0.4 |
| Conservative hold | | Swing | +0.2 | |

General election 2010: High Peak
| Party | Candidate | Votes | % | ±% |
|---|---|---|---|---|
| Conservative | Andrew Bingham | 20,587 | 40.9 | +3.6 |
| Labour | Caitlin Bisknell | 15,910 | 31.6 | −9.5 |
| Liberal Democrats | Alistair Stevens | 10,993 | 21.8 | +2.4 |
| UKIP | Sylvia Hall | 1,690 | 3.4 | +1.2 |
| Green | Peter Allen | 922 | 1.8 | New |
| Independent | Lance Dowson | 161 | 0.3 | New |
| Independent | Tony Alves | 74 | 0.1 | New |
| Majority | | 4,677 | 9.3 | N/A |
| Turnout | | 50,337 | 69.9 | +3.8 |
| Conservative gain from Labour | | Swing | +6.55 | |

=== Elections in the 2000s ===
General election 2005: High Peak
| Party | Candidate | Votes | % | ±% |
|---|---|---|---|---|
| Labour | Tom Levitt | 19,809 | 39.6 | −7.0 |
| Conservative | Andrew Bingham | 19,074 | 38.2 | +0.9 |
| Liberal Democrats | Marc Godwin | 10,000 | 20.0 | +3.9 |
| UKIP | Michael Schwarz | 1,106 | 2.2 | New |
| Majority | | 735 | 1.4 | −7.9 |
| Turnout | | 49,989 | 66.4 | +1.2 |
| Labour hold | | Swing | -3.95 | |

General election 2001: High Peak
| Party | Candidate | Votes | % | ±% |
|---|---|---|---|---|
| Labour | Tom Levitt | 22,430 | 46.6 | −4.2 |
| Conservative | Simon Chapman | 17,941 | 37.3 | +1.8 |
| Liberal Democrats | Peter Ashenden | 7,743 | 16.1 | +4.9 |
| Majority | | 4,489 | 9.3 | −6.0 |
| Turnout | | 48,114 | 65.2 | −13.7 |
| Labour hold | | Swing | −3.0 | |

=== Elections in the 1990s ===
General election 1997: High Peak
| Party | Candidate | Votes | % | ±% |
|---|---|---|---|---|
| Labour | Tom Levitt | 29,052 | 50.8 | +12.9 |
| Conservative | Charles Hendry | 20,261 | 35.5 | −10.5 |
| Liberal Democrats | Sue Barber | 6,420 | 11.2 | −3.6 |
| Referendum | Colin Hanson-Orr | 1,420 | 2.5 | New |
| Majority | | 8,791 | 15.3 | N/A |
| Turnout | | 57,153 | 78.9 | −5.7 |
| Labour gain from Conservative | | Swing | +11.7 | |

General election 1992: High Peak
| Party | Candidate | Votes | % | ±% |
|---|---|---|---|---|
| Conservative | Charles Hendry | 27,538 | 46.0 | +0.3 |
| Labour | Tom Levitt | 22,719 | 37.9 | +9.1 |
| Liberal Democrats | Simon P. Molloy | 8,861 | 14.8 | −10.8 |
| Green | Roger Floyd | 794 | 1.3 | New |
| Majority | | 4,819 | 8.1 | −8.8 |
| Turnout | | 59,912 | 84.6 | +4.1 |
| Conservative hold | | Swing | −4.4 | |

=== Elections in the 1980s ===
General election 1987: High Peak
| Party | Candidate | Votes | % | ±% |
|---|---|---|---|---|
| Conservative | Christopher Hawkins | 25,715 | 45.7 | −0.7 |
| Labour | Jean McCrindle | 16,199 | 28.8 | +2.8 |
| SDP | John Oldham | 14,389 | 25.6 | −2.0 |
| Majority | | 9,516 | 16.9 | −1.9 |
| Turnout | | 56,303 | 80.5 | +2.0 |
| Conservative hold | | Swing | | |

General election 1983: High Peak
| Party | Candidate | Votes | % | ±% |
|---|---|---|---|---|
| Conservative | Christopher Hawkins | 24,534 | 46.4 | −0.1 |
| SDP | David Marquand | 14,594 | 27.6 | +10.7 |
| Labour | David Wilcox | 13,755 | 26.0 | −10.7 |
| Majority | | 9,940 | 18.8 | +9.0 |
| Turnout | | 52,883 | 78.5 | −3.3 |
| Conservative hold | | Swing | | |

=== Elections in the 1970s ===
General election 1979: High Peak
| Party | Candidate | Votes | % | ±% |
|---|---|---|---|---|
| Conservative | Spencer Le Marchant | 22,532 | 46.5 | +5.1 |
| Labour | David Bookbinder | 17,777 | 36.7 | −0.4 |
| Liberal | D. Brown | 8,200 | 16.9 | −4.6 |
| Majority | | 4,755 | 9.8 | +5.5 |
| Turnout | | 48,509 | 81.8 | +1.3 |
| Conservative hold | | Swing | | |

General election October 1974: High Peak
| Party | Candidate | Votes | % | ±% |
|---|---|---|---|---|
| Conservative | Spencer Le Marchant | 19,043 | 41.4 | +1.6 |
| Labour | David Bookbinder | 17,041 | 37.1 | +2.0 |
| Liberal | Christopher Walmsley | 9,875 | 21.5 | −3.6 |
| Majority | | 2,002 | 4.3 | −0.4 |
| Turnout | | 45,959 | 80.5 | −4.9 |
| Conservative hold | | Swing | | |

General election February 1974: High Peak
| Party | Candidate | Votes | % | ±% |
|---|---|---|---|---|
| Conservative | Spencer Le Marchant | 19,231 | 39.8 | −3.9 |
| Labour | Peter Jackson | 16,956 | 35.1 | −5.3 |
| Liberal | Nora Scott | 12,117 | 25.1 | +9.2 |
| Majority | | 2,275 | 4.7 | +1.4 |
| Turnout | | 48,304 | 85.4 | +4.6 |
| Conservative hold | | Swing | | |

General election 1970: High Peak
| Party | Candidate | Votes | % | ±% |
|---|---|---|---|---|
| Conservative | Spencer Le Marchant | 19,558 | 43.7 | +4.4 |
| Labour | Peter Jackson | 18,054 | 40.4 | −0.9 |
| Liberal | Dennis Wrigley | 7,119 | 15.9 | −3.6 |
| Majority | | 1,504 | 3.3 | N/A |
| Turnout | | 44,731 | 80.8 | −3.4 |
| Conservative gain from Labour | | Swing | | |

=== Elections in the 1960s ===
General election 1966: High Peak
| Party | Candidate | Votes | % | ±% |
|---|---|---|---|---|
| Labour | Peter Jackson | 16,938 | 41.3 | +6.4 |
| Conservative | David Walder | 16,124 | 39.3 | +1.2 |
| Liberal | Dennis Wrigley | 7,990 | 19.5 | −7.5 |
| Majority | | 814 | 2.0 | N/A |
| Turnout | | 41,052 | 84.2 | −1.1 |
| Labour gain from Conservative | | Swing | | |

General election 1964: High Peak
| Party | Candidate | Votes | % | ±% |
|---|---|---|---|---|
| Conservative | David Walder | 15,753 | 38.1 | −7.9 |
| Labour | John Roper | 14,416 | 34.9 | +0.9 |
| Liberal | Dennis Wrigley | 11,147 | 27.0 | +7.0 |
| Majority | | 1,337 | 3.2 | −8.9 |
| Turnout | | 41,316 | 85.3 | +2.6 |
| Conservative hold | | Swing | | |

1961 High Peak by-election
| Party | Candidate | Votes | % | ±% |
|---|---|---|---|---|
| Conservative | David Walder | 13,069 | 37.4 | −8.6 |
| Labour | Wilfred McCormack Halsall | 11,201 | 32.1 | −1.9 |
| Liberal | Dennis Wrigley | 10,674 | 30.5 | +10.5 |
| Majority | | 1,868 | 5.3 | −6.7 |
| Turnout | | 34,944 | | |
| Conservative hold | | Swing | | |

=== Elections in the 1950s ===
General election 1959: High Peak
| Party | Candidate | Votes | % | ±% |
|---|---|---|---|---|
| Conservative | Hugh Molson | 18,738 | 46.0 | −2.4 |
| Labour | Bernard Conlan | 13,827 | 34.0 | −0.6 |
| Liberal | Stephen R. Cawley | 8,138 | 20.0 | +3.0 |
| Majority | | 4,911 | 12.0 | −1.78 |
| Turnout | | 40,703 | 82.7 | +3.2 |
| Conservative hold | | Swing | | |

General election 1955: High Peak
| Party | Candidate | Votes | % | ±% |
|---|---|---|---|---|
| Conservative | Hugh Molson | 19,094 | 48.4 | −0.6 |
| Labour | Neil McBride | 13,652 | 34.6 | −7.1 |
| Liberal | Stephen R. Cawley | 6,712 | 17.0 | +7.6 |
| Majority | | 5,442 | 13.8 | +6.5 |
| Turnout | | 39,458 | 79.5 | −6.4 |
| Conservative hold | | Swing | | |

General election 1951: High Peak
| Party | Candidate | Votes | % | ±% |
|---|---|---|---|---|
| Conservative | Hugh Molson | 21,305 | 49.0 | +3.3 |
| Labour | Wilfred McCormack Halsall | 18,127 | 41.7 | +2.5 |
| Liberal | Stephen R. Cawley | 4,070 | 9.4 | −5.7 |
| Majority | | 3,178 | 7.3 | +0.8 |
| Turnout | | 43,502 | 85.9 | +0.1 |
| Conservative hold | | Swing | | |

General election 1950: High Peak
| Party | Candidate | Votes | % | ±% |
|---|---|---|---|---|
| Conservative | Hugh Molson | 19,740 | 45.7 | +0.2 |
| Labour | Wilfred McCormack Halsall | 16,933 | 39.2 | +0.4 |
| Liberal | Tom Stuttard Rothwell | 6,539 | 15.1 | −0.6 |
| Majority | | 2,807 | 6.5 | −0.2 |
| Turnout | | 43,212 | 85.8 | +8.0 |
| Conservative hold | | Swing | | |

=== Elections in the 1940s ===
General election 1945: High Peak
| Party | Candidate | Votes | % | ±% |
|---|---|---|---|---|
| Conservative | Hugh Molson | 18,113 | 45.5 | −8.4 |
| Labour | Wilfred McCormack Halsall | 15,454 | 38.8 | +11.9 |
| Liberal | Tom Stuttard Rothwell | 6,230 | 15.7 | −3.5 |
| Majority | | 2,659 | 6.7 | −20.3 |
| Turnout | | 39,797 | 77.8 | +5.6 |
| Conservative hold | | Swing | | |

=== Elections in the 1930s ===
At the 1939 High Peak by-election, Hugh Molson was elected unopposed.

General election 1935: High Peak
| Party | Candidate | Votes | % | ±% |
|---|---|---|---|---|
| Conservative | Alfred Law | 19,145 | 53.9 | −20.2 |
| Labour | R. W. Wright | 9,559 | 26.9 | +1.0 |
| Liberal | Leonard Radcliffe | 6,831 | 19.2 | New |
| Majority | | 9,586 | 27.00 | −21.2 |
| Turnout | | 35,535 | 72.2 | +24.0 |
| Conservative hold | | Swing | | |

General election 1931: High Peak
| Party | Candidate | Votes | % | ±% |
|---|---|---|---|---|
| Conservative | Alfred Law | 27,577 | 74.1 | +31.0 |
| Labour | George Bagnall | 9,640 | 25.9 | −1.9 |
| Majority | | 17,937 | 48.2 | +34.2 |
| Turnout | | 37,217 | | |
| Conservative hold | | Swing | | |

=== Elections in the 1920s ===
General election 1929: High Peak
| Party | Candidate | Votes | % | ±% |
|---|---|---|---|---|
| Unionist | Alfred Law | 16,406 | 43.1 | −10.2 |
| Liberal | Robert McDougall | 11,083 | 29.1 | −17.6 |
| Labour | George Bagnall | 10,567 | 27.8 | New |
| Majority | | 5,323 | 14.0 | +7.4 |
| Turnout | | 38,056 | 80.9 | +4.1 |
| Registered electors | | 47,066 | | |
| Unionist hold | | Swing | +3.7 | |

General election 1924: High Peak
| Party | Candidate | Votes | % | ±% |
|---|---|---|---|---|
| Unionist | Samuel Hill-Wood | 14,560 | 53.3 | +8.7 |
| Liberal | Robert McDougall | 12,772 | 46.7 | +12.1 |
| Majority | | 1,788 | 6.6 | −3.4 |
| Turnout | | 27,332 | 76.8 | −1.4 |
| Registered electors | | 35,588 | | |
| Unionist hold | | Swing | −1.7 | |

General election 1923: High Peak
| Party | Candidate | Votes | % | ±% |
|---|---|---|---|---|
| Unionist | Samuel Hill-Wood | 12,162 | 44.6 | −7.9 |
| Liberal | Robert McDougall | 9,432 | 34.6 | +14.2 |
| Labour | Frank Anderson | 5,684 | 20.8 | −6.3 |
| Majority | | 2,730 | 10.0 | −15.4 |
| Turnout | | 27,278 | 78.2 | −4.7 |
| Registered electors | | 34,896 | | |
| Unionist hold | | Swing | −11.1 | |

Lady Barlow

General election 1922: High Peak
| Party | Candidate | Votes | % | ±% |
|---|---|---|---|---|
| Unionist | Samuel Hill-Wood | 14,892 | 52.5 | −6.3 |
| Labour | Frank Anderson | 7,698 | 27.1 | New |
| Liberal | Anna Barlow | 5,802 | 20.4 | −20.8 |
| Majority | | 7,194 | 25.4 | +7.8 |
| Turnout | | 28,392 | 82.9 | +20.6 |
| Registered electors | | 34,242 | | |
| Unionist hold | | Swing | +7.3 | |

== Election results 1885–1918 ==
=== Elections in the 1880s ===
Sidebottom

General election 1885: High Peak
| Party | Candidate | Votes | % | ±% |
|---|---|---|---|---|
| Conservative | William Sidebottom | 4,199 | 50.1 | |
| Liberal | John Frederick Cheetham | 4,190 | 49.9 | |
| Majority | | 9 | 0.2 | |
| Turnout | | 8,389 | 89.1 | |
| Registered electors | | 9,414 | | |
| Conservative win (new seat) | | | | |

General election 1886: High Peak
| Party | Candidate | Votes | % | ±% |
|---|---|---|---|---|
| Conservative | William Sidebottom | 4,162 | 51.0 | +0.9 |
| Liberal | Herbert Rhodes | 4,001 | 49.0 | −0.9 |
| Majority | | 161 | 2.0 | +1.8 |
| Turnout | | 8,163 | 86.7 | −2.4 |
| Registered electors | | 9,414 | | |
| Conservative hold | | Swing | +0.9 | |

=== Elections in the 1890s ===
Cheetham

General election 1892: High Peak
| Party | Candidate | Votes | % | ±% |
|---|---|---|---|---|
| Conservative | William Sidebottom | 4,609 | 52.1 | +1.1 |
| Liberal | John Frederick Cheetham | 4,243 | 47.9 | −1.1 |
| Majority | | 366 | 4.2 | +2.2 |
| Turnout | | 8,862 | 79.6 | −7.1 |
| Registered electors | | 11,122 | | |
| Conservative hold | | Swing | +1.1 | |

General election 1895: High Peak
| Party | Candidate | Votes | % | ±% |
|---|---|---|---|---|
| Conservative | William Sidebottom | 4,671 | 52.9 | +0.8 |
| Liberal | Arthur Gibb Symonds | 4,164 | 47.1 | −0.8 |
| Majority | | 507 | 5.8 | +1.6 |
| Turnout | | 8,835 | 85.0 | +5.4 |
| Registered electors | | 10,397 | | |
| Conservative hold | | Swing | +0.8 | |

=== Elections in the 1900s ===
General election 1900: High Peak
| Party | Candidate | Votes | % | ±% |
|---|---|---|---|---|
| Liberal | Oswald Partington | 4,591 | 50.9 | +3.8 |
| Conservative | Samuel Roberts | 4,432 | 49.1 | −3.8 |
| Majority | | 159 | 1.8 | N/A |
| Turnout | | 9,023 | 86.6 | +1.6 |
| Registered electors | | 10,420 | | |
| Liberal gain from Conservative | | Swing | +3.8 | |

General election 1906: High Peak
| Party | Candidate | Votes | % | ±% |
|---|---|---|---|---|
| Liberal | Oswald Partington | 5,450 | 53.9 | +3.0 |
| Conservative | Albert Profumo | 4,662 | 46.1 | −3.0 |
| Majority | | 788 | 7.8 | +6.0 |
| Turnout | | 10,112 | 90.7 | +4.1 |
| Registered electors | | 11,154 | | |
| Liberal hold | | Swing | +3.0 | |

Partington

1909 High Peak by-election
| Party | Candidate | Votes | % | ±% |
|---|---|---|---|---|
| Liberal | Oswald Partington | 5,619 | 51.6 | −2.3 |
| Conservative | Albert Profumo | 5,272 | 48.4 | +2.3 |
| Majority | | 347 | 3.2 | −4.6 |
| Turnout | | 10,891 | 91.1 | +0.4 |
| Registered electors | | 11,951 | | |
| Liberal hold | | Swing | −2.3 | |

=== Elections in the 1910s ===
General election January 1910: High Peak
| Party | Candidate | Votes | % | ±% |
|---|---|---|---|---|
| Liberal | Oswald Partington | 5,912 | 50.5 | −1.1 |
| Conservative | Samuel Hill-Wood | 5,806 | 49.5 | +1.1 |
| Majority | | 106 | 1.0 | −2.2 |
| Turnout | | 11,718 | 94.4 | +3.3 |
| Liberal hold | | Swing | -1.1 | |

General election December 1910: High Peak
| Party | Candidate | Votes | % | ±% |
|---|---|---|---|---|
| Conservative | Samuel Hill-Wood | 5,813 | 50.8 | +0.3 |
| Liberal | Oswald Partington | 5,629 | 49.2 | −0.3 |
| Majority | | 184 | 1.6 | N/A |
| Turnout | | 11,442 | 92.2 | −2.2 |
| Conservative gain from Liberal | | Swing | +0.3 | |

General Election 1914–15:

Another General Election was required to take place before the end of 1915. The political parties had been making preparations for an election to take place and by July 1914, the following candidates had been selected;

- Unionist: Samuel Hill-Wood
- Liberal: Oswald Partington

General election 1918: High Peak
| Party | | Candidate | Votes | % | ±% |
|---|---|---|---|---|---|
| C | Unionist | Samuel Hill-Wood | 12,118 | 58.8 | +8.0 |
| | Liberal | Clifford Brookes | 8,504 | 41.2 | −8.0 |
| Majority | | | 3,614 | 17.6 | +16.0 |
| Turnout | | | 20,622 | 62.3 | −29.9 |
| Registered electors | | | 33,075 | | |
| | Unionist hold | | Swing | +8.0 | |
C indicates candidate endorsed by the coalition government.

== See also ==
- List of parliamentary constituencies in Derbyshire
