= Hugh Molson, Baron Molson =

British Conservative politician

The Right Honourable The Lord Molson PC

Minister of Works
- In office 1957–1959
- Preceded by: Patrick George Thomas Buchan-Hepburn
- Succeeded by: John Hope, 1st Baron Glendevon

Parliamentary Secretary to the Ministry of Transport
- In office 11 November 1953 – 9 January 1957
- Preceded by: John Profumo
- Succeeded by: Richard Nugent

Member of Parliament for High Peak
- In office 7 October 1939 – 31 January 1961
- Preceded by: Sir Alfred Law
- Succeeded by: David Walder

Member of Parliament for Doncaster
- In office 27 October 1931 – 14 November 1935
- Preceded by: Wilfred Paling
- Succeeded by: Alfred Short

Personal details
- Born: Arthur Hugh Elsdale Molson; 29 June 1903 Chelmsford, Essex, England
- Died: 13 October 1991 (aged 88) Westminster, London, England
- Party: Conservative
- Spouse: Nancy Astington (m. 1949; died 1991)
- Parent: John Elsdale Molson (father)
- Education: New College, Oxford

Arthur Hugh Elsdale Molson, Baron Molson, PC (29 June 1903 – 13 October 1991) was a British Conservative politician and member of the Molson family of Montreal.

== Life and career ==
Born in Chelmsford, Essex, he was the only surviving son of Major John Elsdale Molson, Member of Parliament for Gainsborough from 1918 to 1923, and Mary Leeson. He was educated at the Royal Naval College, Osborne, and Dartmouth, at Lancing, and at New College, Oxford.

At Lancing, Molson was a contemporary and close friend of Evelyn Waugh, and known as "Hot-lunch”. To the young Waugh, he represented a figure of louche daring, as evidenced by many suggestive but mostly inexplicit references in his published letters and diaries. They were less close from Oxford onwards.

Molson was President of the Oxford Union in 1925 and graduated with first-class honours in Jurisprudence in 1925. He worked as Political Secretary of the Associated Chambers of Commerce of India from 1926 to 1929, then he became a barrister-at-law at the Inner Temple in 1931.

He was commissioned on 4 March 1939 and served with the 36th (Middlesex) Searchlight Regiment, Royal Artillery from 1939 to 1941. He was Staff Captain with the 11th Anti-Aircraft Division from 1941 to 1942.

Molson was the unsuccessful Conservative candidate in Aberdare in 1929, then sat as Member of Parliament (MP) for Doncaster from 1931 to 1935 and for High Peak, Derbyshire, from 1939 to 1961. He was elected unopposed at the 1939 High Peak by-election, after the death of Alfred Law. He held Ministerial office as Parliamentary Secretary to the Ministry of Works from 1951 to 1953, Joint Parliamentary Secretary to the Ministry of Transport and Civil Aviation from November 1953 to January 1957, and as Minister of Works from 1957 until October 1959. He was a Member of the Monckton Commission on Rhodesia and Nyasaland in 1960, and Chairman of the Commission of Privy Counsellors on the dispute between Buganda and Bunyoro in 1962.

In 1949, Molson married Nancy Astington, daughter of W.H. Astington of Bramhall, Cheshire. He was appointed a Privy Counsellor in 1956, and was created a Life Peer on 21 February 1961 as Baron Molson, of High Peak in the County of Derby.

In later life, Molson was Chairman (1968–71) and President (1971–80) of the Council for the Protection of Rural England. He died at Westminster in 1991, aged 88.

== Notable quotations ==
- "I will look at any additional evidence to confirm the opinion to which I have already come."

== Arms ==
Coat of arms of Hugh Molson, Baron Molson

Crest
A crescent Argent between two wings the dexter Gules the sinister Azure each charged with a maple leaf Or.
Escutcheon
Per pale Azure and Gules three crescents Argent on a chief Ermine a lion passant guardant Or between two roses of the third barbed and seeded Proper.
Supporters
On either side a golden retriever dog Proper gorged with a collar indented throughout Or and Gules lined Sable.
Motto
Industria Et Spe (By Industry And Hope)

== See also ==
- Canadian peers and baronets

Parliament of the United Kingdom
Preceded by Wilfred Paling	Member of Parliament for Doncaster; 1931–1935	Succeeded by Alfred Short
Preceded by Alfred Joseph Law	Member of Parliament for High Peak; 1939–1961	Succeeded by David Walder
Political offices
Preceded by John Profumo	Parliamentary Secretary to the Ministry of Transport; 1953–1957	Succeeded by Richard Nugent
Preceded by Patrick George Thomas Buchan-Hepburn	Minister of Works; 1957–1959	Succeeded by John Hope, 1st Baron Glendevon
