= Derby Combined Court Centre =

Judicial building in Derby, England

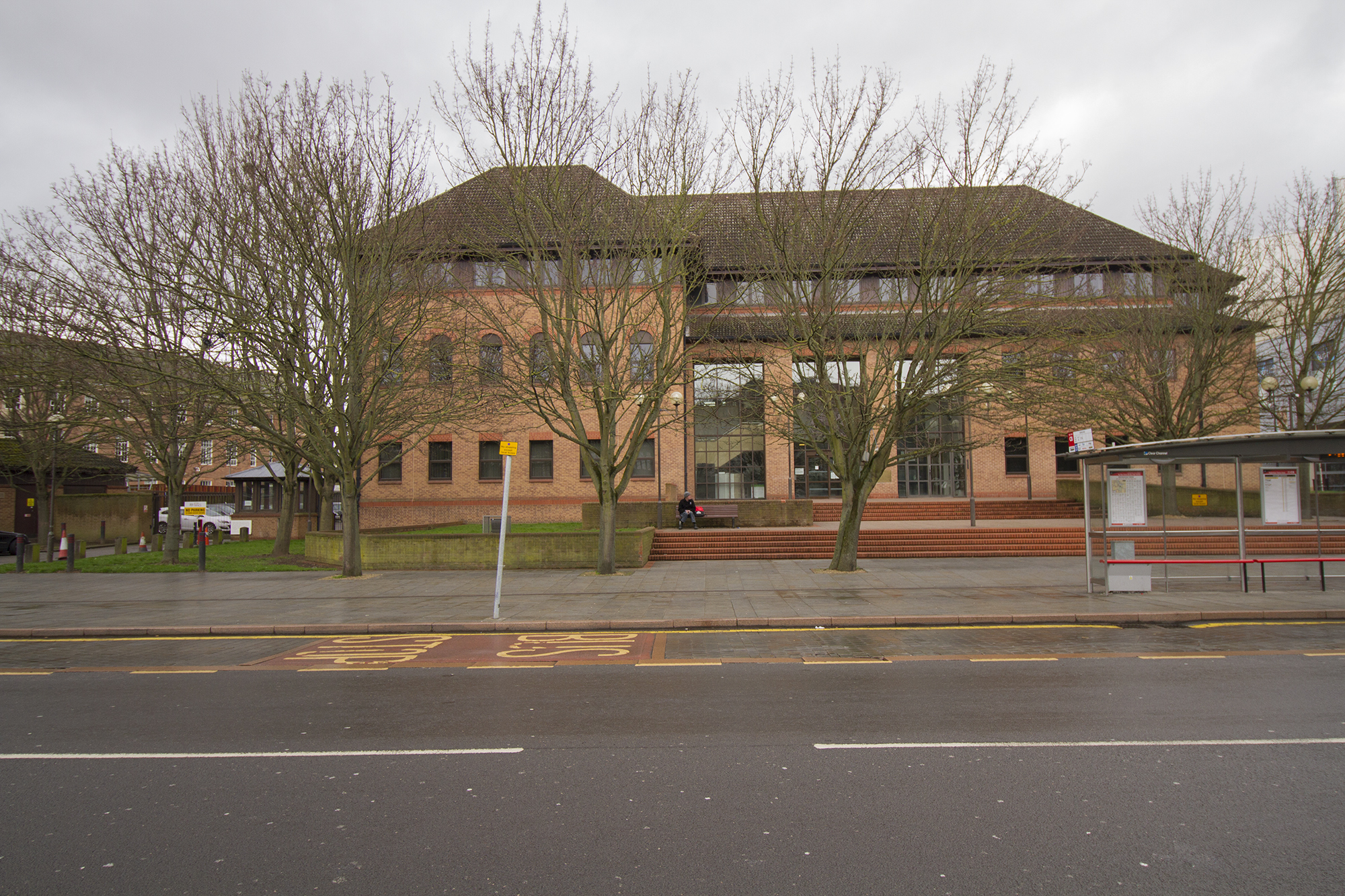
- Derby Combined Court Centre

- Shown in Derbyshire
- 52.9224°N 1.4731°W
- Location: Morledge, Derby

History
- Built: 1989

Site notes
- Architect: Property Services Agency
- Architectural style: Modernist style

The Derby Combined Court Centre is a Crown Court venue, which deals with criminal cases, as well as a County Court, which deals with civil cases, in Morledge, Derby, England.

== History ==
Until the late 1980s, criminal court hearings were held in the County Hall in St Mary's Gate. However, as the number of court cases in the Derby area grew, it became necessary to commission a more modern courthouse. The site selected by the Lord Chancellor's Department, on the north side of Morledge, had accommodated a lead foundry owned by Cox, Poyser and Company before the area was cleared. A 150 feet (46 m) high tower, used for lead shot production, had been a prominent local landmark before it was demolished and replaced with a covered market in 1932.

The new building was designed by the Property Services Agency in the Modernist style, built in red brick at a cost of £7.4 million, and was officially opened by the Lord Chief Justice, Lord Lane, on 17 May 1989. The design involved an asymmetrical main frontage of thirteen bays facing onto Morledge. The left hand section, which was projected forward, was fenestrated with tall casement windows on the ground floor and round headed windows on the first floor. The right hand section featured, on the left, three full-height recesses enclosing three glass doorways leading to an atrium. There was a large Royal coat of arms above the central doorway and, on the right, there were four more bays fenestrated with tall casement windows on both floors. There was also an attic level fenestrated by small bi-partite windows and surmounted by prominent eaves. Internally, the building was laid out to accommodate nine courtrooms.

Notable cases have included the trial and conviction of Jason Lawrance, in March 2016, on five counts of rape against women he met through the online dating service, Match.com, the trial and conviction of John Wass, in August 2017, on 17 counts of historical child abuse which included rape, sexual assault and sexual exposure, and the trial and conviction of Damien Bendall, in December 2022, for the murder of his partner, Terri Harris, and three children.
