= Martin Doughty =

British environmentalist

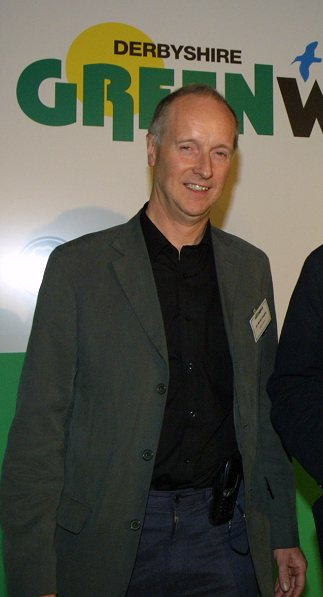
Sir Martin Doughty, former leader of Derbyshire County Council at the council's annual 'Greenwatch Awards' for environmental achievement in May 2003.

Sir Martin Doughty (11 October 1949 – 4 March 2009) was the Chair of Natural England and a well-known figure in modern British conservation.

== Biography ==
Martin Doughty began his career as a lecturer in Environmental Management at Sheffield Hallam University.

Subsequently, he worked primarily in the public or voluntary sectors with roles such as Leader of Derbyshire County Council from 1992 until 2001. He was also a Board Member for the Countryside Agency (1999 – 2005) and was the Chair of English Nature before taking up his final position as Chair of Natural England.

He received a knighthood in 2001 for services to local government in Derbyshire, followed by Honorary Doctorates from Sheffield Hallam University in 2002, Cranfield University in 2005, and Derby University in 2006.

He died of cancer on 4 March 2009, aged 59.
