= Fair for You =

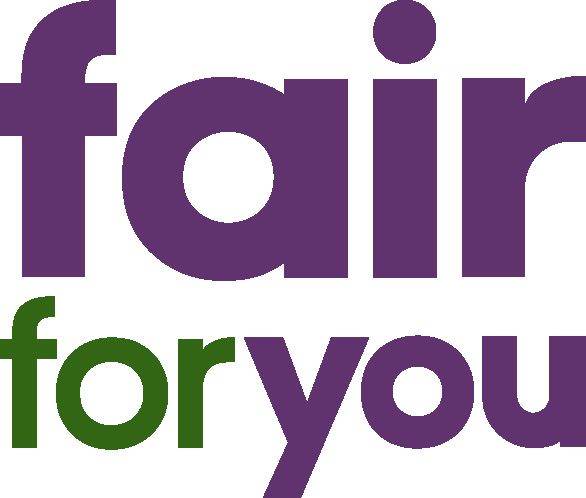
- Type: Community Interest Company
- Industry: Loans
- Founded: 2015
- Founder: Angela Clements
- Headquarters: United Kingdom
- Key people: Simon Dukes, CEO
- Products: Bedroom furniture, Household Appliances
- Brands: Hotpoint, Indesit, Whirlpool
- Owner: Fair Credit Charity
- Website: www.fairforyou.co.uk

Fair for You is a British, not-for-profit online lending company. It is a Community Interest Company set up to provide finance to families who do not have access to mainstream credit, so that they can purchase goods for their home directly from the manufacturers.

Fair for You is the trading name of Fair for You Enterprise CIC. It is owned by the Fair Credit Charity, a registered charity previously called Fair for You Ltd.

== History ==
Fair for You was established in 2015 by Angela Clements, who had run the Citysave Credit Union in Birmingham. The business model was developed over two years, based on market research done on family households on less than £25k a year.

Fair for You secured £470,000 in September 2014, obtained its FCA licence in December 2015 and was launched in February 2016 at the House of Commons.

According to the Financial Conduct Authority, around half of the people who have used other rent-to-own companies have experienced some degree of late payment fees, with more than one in 10 thought to end up having their goods repossessed. Chair of the All Party Parliamentary Group on Debt and Personal Finance and Labour MP Yvonne Fovargue said at the launch event: "Fair For You is a real alternative to other rent to own companies."

Founder Angela Clements left Fair for You in 2020, and Simon Dukes was made CEO the following year.

== Awards ==
Fair for You has recently won the 'Consumer Credit Team of the Year' in the Credit Awards 2020 by Credit Strategy.

Fair for You has been voted Firm of the Year and Best Loan Provider (Lending <£2.5k) at the Consumer Credit Awards 2020, retaining the title Firm of the Year for three consecutive years.

In March 2020 Fair for You with EML and Lending Metrics won the Affordable Credit Challenge by Nesta in partnership with HM Treasury.

In 2019, Fair for You was the only triple award winner at the Consumer Credit Awards, voted Firm of the Year, Treating Customers Fairly Champion and Customer Service Champion.

Previously at the Consumer Credit Awards Fair for You were voted, Best Alternative Finance Provider and Firm of the Year in 2018 and Consumer Credit Champions & Best Newcomer in 2017.

They have also been finalists for the Customer Engagement Solution category in the Credit & Collections Technology Awards 2018.

== Product offerings ==
Fair for You offers finance to purchase essential household items at an Annual Percentage Rate (APR) of 55.6%.

== Charity and partnerships ==
In 2018 Michael Sheen launched an alliance of organisations that are working towards providing alternatives to high cost credit and eliminating the poverty premium in the UK, which Fair for You is a part of.

Fair for You have been members of the Social Enterprise UK since 2017.

Fair for You has built an online high street by partnering with manufacturers and retailers. In 2015, the company partnered with Whirlpool, whose brands include Hotpoint and Indesit.

They received funding from a number of partners in 2014, such as Esmée Fairbairn Foundation, Joseph Rowntree Foundation, The Funding Network and others.

The organisation is working with a range of organisations, including Turn2us and the Money Advice Trust, to bring the offering to market.
