= Spencer Le Marchant =

British politician (1931–1986)

Sir Spencer Le Marchant

Comptroller of the Household
- In office 7 May 1979 – 30 September 1981
- Prime Minister: Margaret Thatcher
- Preceded by: James Hamilton
- Succeeded by: Anthony Berry

Member of Parliament for High Peak
- In office 18 June 1970 – 9 June 1983
- Preceded by: Peter Jackson
- Succeeded by: Christopher Hawkins

Personal details
- Born: 15 January 1931 Edmonton, London, England
- Died: 7 September 1986 (aged 55) Isle of Wight, England
- Party: Conservative

Sir Spencer Le Marchant (15 January 1931 – 7 September 1986) was a British Conservative Party politician.

== Early life ==
Born in Edmonton, London, Le Marchant was educated at Eton College and was a member of the London Stock Exchange. He served as a councillor on Westminster City Council from 1956.

== Political career ==
Le Marchant unsuccessfully contested Vauxhall, a London safe seat held by the Labour Party's George Strauss since its formation in 1950, at the 1966 general election. He was elected to the House of Commons as member of parliament for the marginal Derbyshire constituency of High Peak at the 1970 general election, and held the seat until he retired from Parliament at the 1983 general election. He was appointed Comptroller of the Household when Margaret Thatcher came to power in 1979.

Le Marchant received note in Thatcher's memoirs as "famous for his intake of champagne", 6 foot and 6 inches tall, and "could be heard booming out the result" when the then Labour government lost a motion of no confidence by one vote, causing the 1979 general election.

== Later life ==
Le Marchant retired from the House of Commons at the 1983 general election, and died at the age of 55 in 1986 on the Isle of Wight.

== Personal life ==
In 1955 he married Lucinda Gaye Leveson-Gower, daughter of Brigadier General Hugh Nugent Leveson-Gower, RA and his first wife, Avril Joy Mullens (later fourth wife of Ernest Aldrich Simpson, himself the second husband of Wallis, Duchess of Windsor, whose love affair with King Edward VIII led to the 1936 abdication crisis).

In 2006, Michael Brown, a former Conservative MP from 1979 to 1997, stated that Le Marchant had tried unsuccessfully to seduce him. According to former-MP-turned-journalist Matthew Parris, Le Marchant was a "repressed homosexual".

Parliament of the United Kingdom
Preceded by Peter Jackson	Member of Parliament for High Peak; 1970–1983	Succeeded by Christopher Hawkins
Political offices
Preceded by James Hamilton	Comptroller of the Household; 1979–1981	Succeeded by Anthony Berry
