= Derbyshire County Council =

Local authority for Derbyshire, England

Type
- Type: Non-metropolitan county council

Leadership
- Chair: Jodie Brown, Reform UK since 27 May 2026
- Leader: Alan Graves, Reform UK since 21 May 2025
- Chief Executive: Neil Crittenden since 19 January 2026

Structure
- Seats: 64 councillors
- Graph of the party split among 64 seats.
- Political groups: Administration (42) Reform (42) Other parties (22) Conservative (10) Liberal Democrats (3) Green (3) Labour (2) Independent (4)
- Length of term: 4 years

Elections
- Voting system: First-past-the-post
- Last election: 1 May 2025
- Next election: 3 May 2029

Meeting place
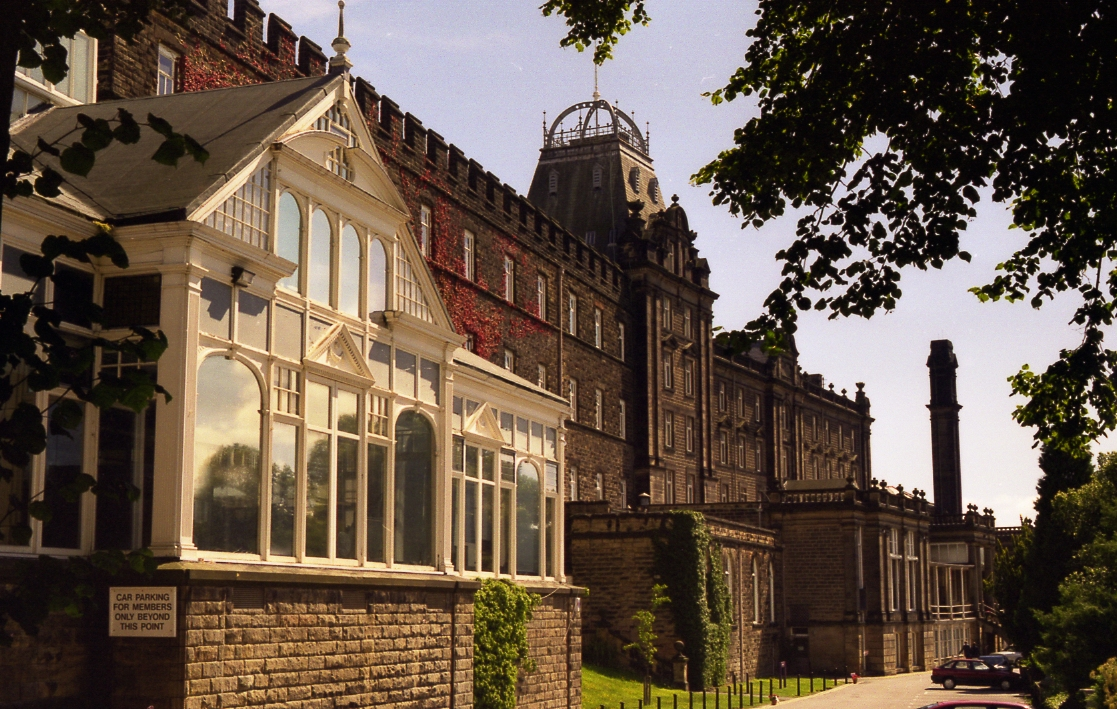
- County Hall, Smedley Street, Matlock, DE4 3AG

Website
- www.derbyshire.gov.uk

Derbyshire County Council is the upper-tier local authority for the non-metropolitan county of Derbyshire in England. The non-metropolitan county is smaller than the ceremonial county, which additionally includes Derby. The county council is based at County Hall in Matlock. The council has been under Reform UK majority control since the 2025 election. The council is a constituent member of the East Midlands Combined County Authority.

== History ==
Elected county councils were created in 1889 under the Local Government Act 1888, taking over administrative functions which had previously been performed by unelected magistrates at the quarter sessions. The borough of Derby was considered large enough for its existing borough council to provide county-level services, and so it was made a county borough, independent from the county council. The 1888 Act also directed that urban sanitary districts which straddled county boundaries were to be placed entirely in one county, which saw Derbyshire gain part of New Mills from Cheshire but cede its part of Burton upon Trent to Staffordshire. Derbyshire County Council was elected by and provided services to the parts of the county (as thus adjusted) outside the county borough of Derby. The county council's area was termed the administrative county.

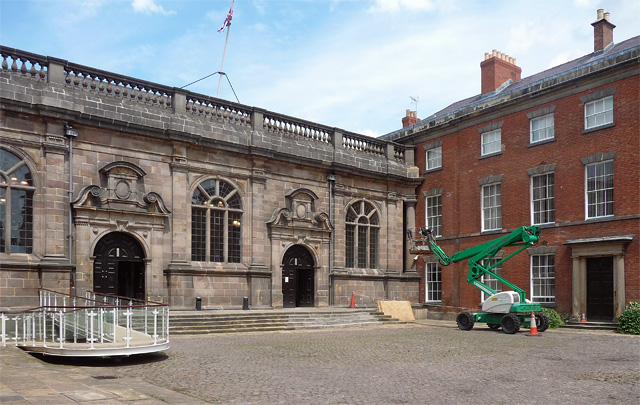
County Hall, Derby: Council's meeting place 1889–1955

The first elections were held in January 1889, and the council formally came into being on 1 April 1889, on which day it held its first official meeting at County Hall, Derby, the courthouse (built 1660) which served as the meeting place for the quarter sessions. William Evans of Allestree Hall, a former Liberal MP, served as the first chairman.

In 1974, the Local Government Act 1972 reconstituted Derbyshire as a non-metropolitan county, with some adjustments to the county council's territory, most notably gaining Derby. The lower tier of local government was reorganised as part of the same reforms. Previously it had comprised numerous boroughs, urban districts and rural districts; they were reorganised into nine non-metropolitan districts. Derby regained its independence from the county council in 1997, when the city council was made a unitary authority.

In 2024 a combined authority was established covering Derbyshire, Derby, Nottingham and Nottinghamshire, called the East Midlands Combined County Authority. The combined authority is chaired by the directly elected mayor of the East Midlands and oversees the delivery of certain strategic functions across the area.

== Governance ==
Derbyshire County Council provides county-level services. District-level services are provided by the area's eight district councils. Much of the county is also covered by civil parishes, which form a third tier of local government.

The eight district councils are:

- Amber Valley Borough Council
- Erewash Borough Council
- Bolsover District Council
- Chesterfield Borough Council
- North East Derbyshire District Council
- High Peak Borough Council
- Derbyshire Dales District Council
- South Derbyshire District Council

== Political control ==
The council has been under Reform majority control since 2025.

Political control of the council since the 1974 reforms has been as follows:

| Party in control | Years |
|---|---|
| Labour | 1974–1977 |
| Conservative | 1977–1981 |
| Labour | 1981–2009 |
| Conservative | 2009–2012 |
| No overall control | 2012–2013 |
| Labour | 2013–2017 |
| Conservative | 2017–2025 |
| Reform | 2025–present |

=== Leadership ===
The leaders of the council since 1974 have been:

| Councillor | Party | From | To |
|---|---|---|---|
| Peter Regan | Labour | 1974 | 1977 |
| Walter Marshall | Conservative | May 1977 | May 1981 |
| David Bookbinder | Labour | May 1981 | 1992 |
| Martin Doughty | Labour | 1992 | 2001 |
| John Williams | Labour | 2001 | 2009 |
| Andrew Lewer | Conservative | 2009 | May 2013 |
| Anne Western | Labour | May 2013 | May 2017 |
| Barry Lewis | Conservative | 24 May 2017 | May 2025 |
| Alan Graves | Reform | 21 May 2025 | |

=== Composition ===
Following the 2025 election, and subsequent by-elections and changes of allegiance up to May 2026, the composition of the council was:

| Party | Seats |
|---|---|
| Reform | 42 |
| Conservative | 10 |
| Liberal Democrats | 3 |
| Green | 3 |
| Labour | 2 |
| Independent | 4 |
| Total | 64 |

Three of the independent councillors sit together as the "Derbyshire Independents" group. The next election is due in May 2029.

== Premises ==
The council is based at County Hall, Matlock.

From its creation in 1889 until 1955 the council met at County Hall, Derby, which had been built in 1660, despite Derby being outside of the county council's area. In 1955, the council moved to a converted former hydrotherapy complex called Smedley's Hydro in Matlock, which had been built in 1867, renaming the building County Hall.

== Elections ==
Since 2013 the council has comprised 64 councillors. Following the most recent Boundary Review, from the 2025 election each electoral division was represented by a single councillor. Elections are held every four years.

== Notable former members ==
- Dennis Skinner (1964–1970), later member of parliament for Bolsover
- Andrew Lewer (2005–2014; leader 2009–2013), later member of European Parliament for the East Midlands
